= Indians in the New York metropolitan area =

Ethnic group in the United States

Indians in the New York City metropolitan region

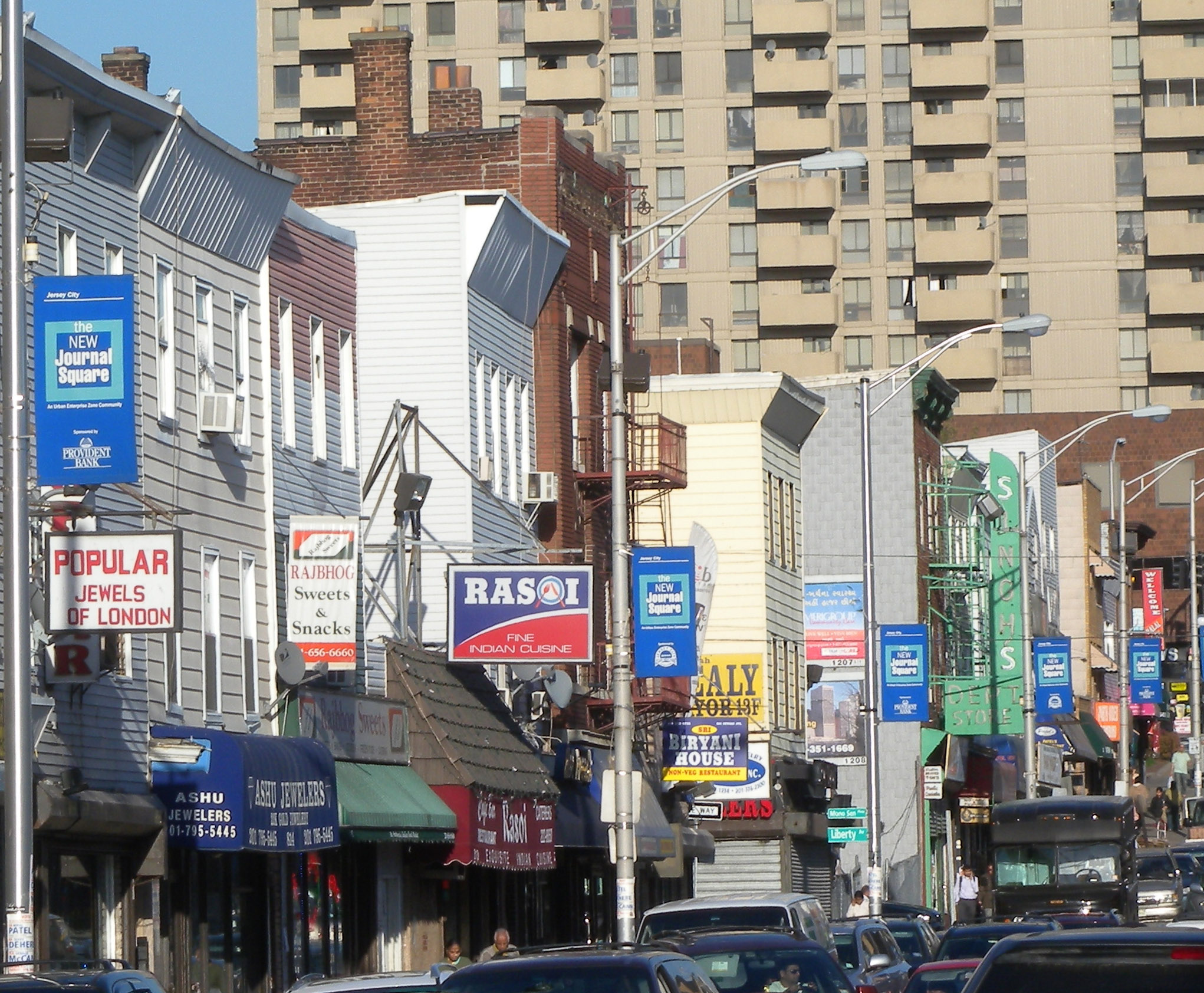
India Square in Jersey City, New Jersey, United States, is home to the highest concentration of Asian Indians in the Western Hemisphere, and one of at least 24 Indian American enclaves characterized as a Little India which have emerged within the New York City Metropolitan Area, with the largest metropolitan Indian population outside Asia, as large-scale immigration from India continues into New York City.

Indians in the New York City metropolitan area constitute one of the largest and fastest-growing ethnicities in the New York City metropolitan area of the United States. The New York City region is home to the largest and most prominent Indian American population among metropolitan areas by a significant margin, enumerating approximately 810,000 uniracial individuals as of 2025. The Asian Indian population also represents the second-largest metropolitan Asian national diaspora both outside of Asia and within the New York City metropolitan area, following the also rapidly growing and hemisphere-leading population of the estimated 1 million uniracial Chinese in the New York City metropolitan area in 2025.

The U.S. state of New Jersey, where most of the population is situated within the New York City metropolitan region, has by a significant margin the highest proportional Indian population concentration of any U.S. state. According to Census estimates in 2023, 4.6% of New Jersey's population consists of individuals of Indian origin. New Jersey is the state with the highest percentage of individuals with Indian ancestry in the United States, at approximately 5%. Outside of New Jersey, New York City proper was home to an estimated 214,559 uniracial Indian individuals, the highest by a significant margin of any U.S. city proper.

== History ==
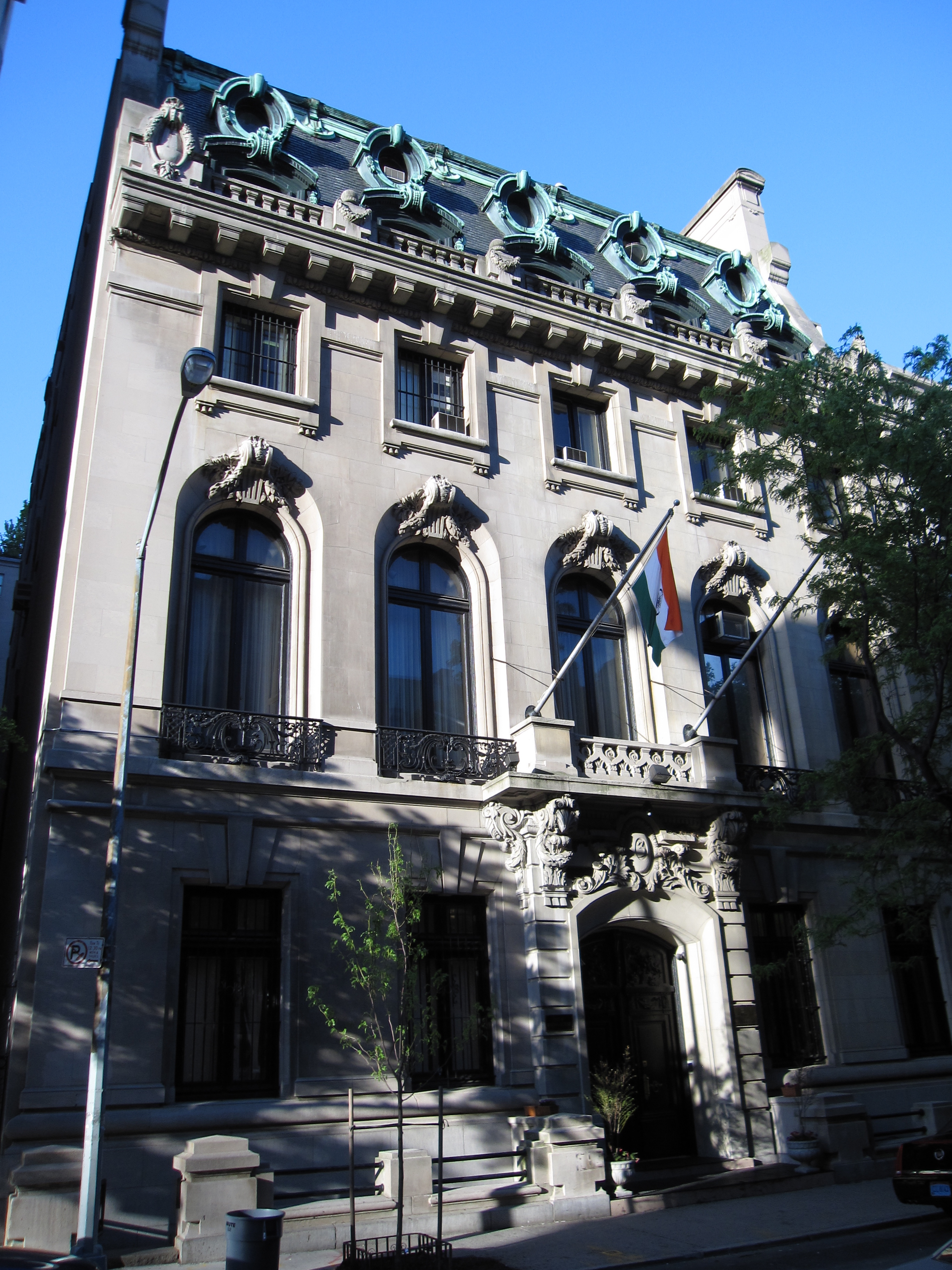
New India House, the home of the Indian Consulate-General in New York, on East 64th Street, in the Upper East Side Historic District of Manhattan

An Asian Indian presence in the New York area dates back to the 19th century, with Swami Vivekananda establishing the first Hindu institution in New York City in 1894 after the 1893 Parliament of the World's Religions in Chicago and Bengali Muslim peddlers passing through immigration facilities in New York to head to Jersey Shore beach towns such as Asbury Park, Atlantic Park and Long Beach. These peddlers sold "Oriental" items like silks, small trinkets and other curios to tourists. Though most of these peddlers were transient seasonal workers at resorts, a small number of men stayed in New Jersey year-round to renew stocks of goods and shepherd younger traders from India to the US. Bengali and other South Asian Muslims would also settle in New York City and marry into African American and Puerto Rican communities that they lived close to, initially living on the Lower East Side but moving uptown into Harlem, opening some of the first Indian restaurants in New York. After India became independent and partitioned, many of these men formed the Pakistan League of America in 1947.

The first Indian to become a naturalized U.S. citizen was Bhicaji Balsara, a resident of New York. However, this was after the Luce–Celler Act of 1946 that restored naturalization rights to Indian Americans in the United States. A number of Indian Americans came to the U.S. via Indian communities from other countries, including the United Kingdom, Canada, South Africa, Mauritius, Malaysia, Singapore, Suriname, Guyana, Trinidad and Tobago, Fiji, Kenya, Tanzania, Uganda, and Jamaica. The quota on Indian immigration was removed in the 1960s, leading to exponential growth in the number of Indian immigrants to the United States. While Indians prior to this time were primarily involved in agricultural endeavors or constructing railroads in the western United States, by the 1960s, there was a small Manhattan-based Indian community consisting of graduate students in Columbia University and New York University, diplomatic attachés at the United Nations and Indian corporate workers. However, the largest number hereafter came to New York City and its affluent suburban environs, consisting largely of professionals, including physicians, engineers, financiers, scientists, entrepreneurs, and lawyers, as well as businesspeople, though there was also small population concentrated along 116th Street and Broadway in Manhattan that was poorer. By 1974, there was a notable Indian population in the greater New York area, with particular concentrations in Hoboken, New Jersey and Flushing, Queens, though neither was strongly identified as a Little India at this point and there was already a push to move out to the suburbs, especially to Nassau County on Long Island. with houses of worship for Indian religions starting to be built around the larger Indian suburban communities throughout the 1980s and 1990s.

During the 1960s and 1970s, Indians also set up several cultural and religious institutions based in New York City, though they drew people from the entire metropolitan area. The 1970s would also see the construction of the first houses of worship for Indian religions in New York City, such as the Hindu Temple Society of North America in Flushing and the Sikh Cultural Society building a gurdwara at a former Baptist church in Richmond Hill. Other religious groups reappropriated other spaces in the city, such as Keralite Christians hosting Malayalam services in a Bronx church and Jains renting Manhattan office space. Indian would also form several associations based around linguistics groups. Indians in the New York-New Jersey area also started to create mass media organizations in the 1970s, including newspapers such as India Abroad, the first television show targeted towards Indian Americans, and by 1975, 13 half-hour radio shows for New York Indians. Movie theaters in Manhattan and Queens showing Indian movies also started to open.

A small Little India did already exist in Manhattan on Lexington Avenue, between 27th and 30th streets around the former Little Armenia spice shop of Kalustyan's, which had become popular among Indian and other South Asian immigrants in the 1960s and had become notable enough to be featured in the New York Daily News as a prime spot for Indian food and groceries by 1976. However, by the 1980s, the Lexington Avenue Little India was eroding due to increased competition from other Indian districts in Queens which were closer to where the Indian population lived.

The most famous enclave in the New York City area – Jackson Heights – emerged during the 1970s, with electronics store Sam and Raj, being opened by merchants Subhash Kapadia and Nitin Vora in 1976 and then being quickly followed by a number of Indian stores opening on 74th Street. Though many Indians actually lived in the adjacent, cheaper neighborhood of Elmhurst, Jackson Heights quickly became popular among the regional Indian and South Asian community due to its location near a major subway transfer station and the overall large Indian population in Queens. By 1990, there were already 74 Indian businesses in Jackson Heights and businessowners had formed the Jackson Heights Merchants Association in response to conflict between Indian immigrants and white residents over perceived quality-of-life issues.

Other neighborhoods in Queens also became notable South Asian enclaves during the 1980s and 1990s. Flushing, one of the first destinations for immigrants and home to the borough's first Hindu temple, would have its first Indian grocery store in 1970 and be followed by a small strip of Indian stores. Though now mainly known as one of New York's largest Chinatowns and Koreatowns, Flushing had a similar population of Indians compared to Koreans and Chinese in 1980. Richmond Hill in southeastern Queens would become a major hub for Indo-Caribbean immigrants from Guyana and Trinidad and Tobago and Sikhs from Punjab, with the Sikh Cultural Society becoming a major gathering point for the latter group. A large concentration of Malayalees would also pop up in eastern Queens neighborhoods near the Nassau County border.

Starting in the 1990s, following the path of past generations of New Yorkers, many Indian immigrants starting moving eastward from Queens to more suburban areas of Long Island in the 1990s, including Nassau County towns such as Hicksville, Elmont, East Meadow, and North New Hyde Park seeking bigger homes, better schools, and more space. During the 1990s, Indians were the fastest growing ethnic group on Long Island. This coincided with a change in the businesses and clientele in the older enclaves like Jackson Heights, with establishments being targeted more towards working-class immigrants than the English-speaking professionals who were the main shoppers in Queens, as seen by more signage in Jackson Heights being in vernacular languages. Hicksville would become the center of the Indian community on Long Island, with Indian stores concentrating on South Broadway around Route 107 by the 2000s.

Indians also sprawled further into New Jersey, with growing concentrations of Indians in areas such as Middlesex County, New Jersey, where 55,000 Indians lived by 2000 and in Jersey City. During the 1990s, these two areas would see their main centers of Indian commerce – Oak Tree Road in Edison, New Jersey, and Newark Avenue in the Journal Square neighborhood in Jersey City become primarily Indian, compared to the 1970s and 1980s, where there was a more of a mixture of businesses. By 1994, there were already over 100 Indian businesses on Oak Tree Road.

As more Indians started to move into the New Jersey enclaves and they grew increasingly more affluent, tensions started to increase between them and prior residents. In the late 1980s, a hate group called the Dotbusters – named after the bindi that many Hindu women wear – beat up several Indians in Jersey City, including killing a Parsi man, Narvoze Mody. That same month, a letter threatening to attack Indians in the city was also published in its main newspaper, The Jersey Journal, and there were several racist messages written on the stores and homes of Indian immigrants. Community leaders accused Jersey City's government of responding slowly to the attacks and at one point invited the Guardian Angels to patrol the city's streets. Following a series of protests and increased attention from the city government, racist attacks started to decrease by the end of the decade.

However, the increased racism was a reason for some Indians to move southwards to Edison and Middlesex County, though they also faced some resistance there as they started to set up businesses in Edison, with stores on Oak Tree Road being vandalized and proprietors saying that city government did not take them seriously. Indians in Edison and Iselin would also get into other conflicts with the city governments, with the Indian Business Association of the area protesting high amounts of traffic tickets and curfews on its Navratri celebration.

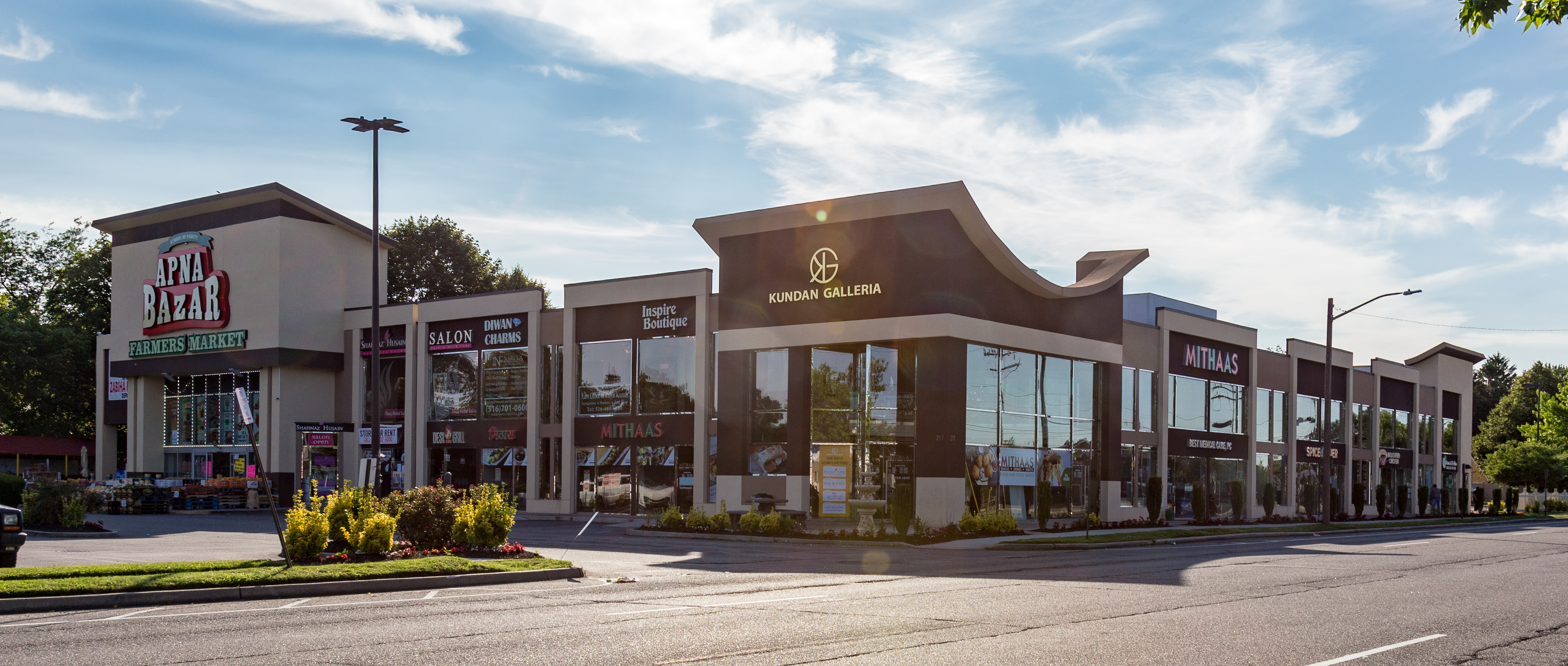
A South Asian shopping center in Hicksville, New York, on Long Island

The Indian American population would also surge in the further reaches of Central New Jersey in the 2000s in towns such as West Windsor, Plainsboro, and Montgomery. The Indian influence in this area manifested itself with the creation of an annual Indian-American fair in Mercer County Park and the creation of cricket fields and leagues in the area. By the 2010s, there were pushes to teach Hindi and have Diwali off at school districts in Central New Jersey. Around this time, there were also a series of home invasions apparently targeting Indians and South Asians in New Jersey, which started to prompt questions about a lack of Indian and more broadly Asian representation in New Jersey's local police forces. Indian Prime Minister Narendra Modi, who had already been to New York on multiple visits, was welcomed on June 20, 2023, by the Indian diaspora at JFK International Airport on his first State visit to the U.S., which also entailed a trip to Washington, D.C.

== Geographical distribution ==
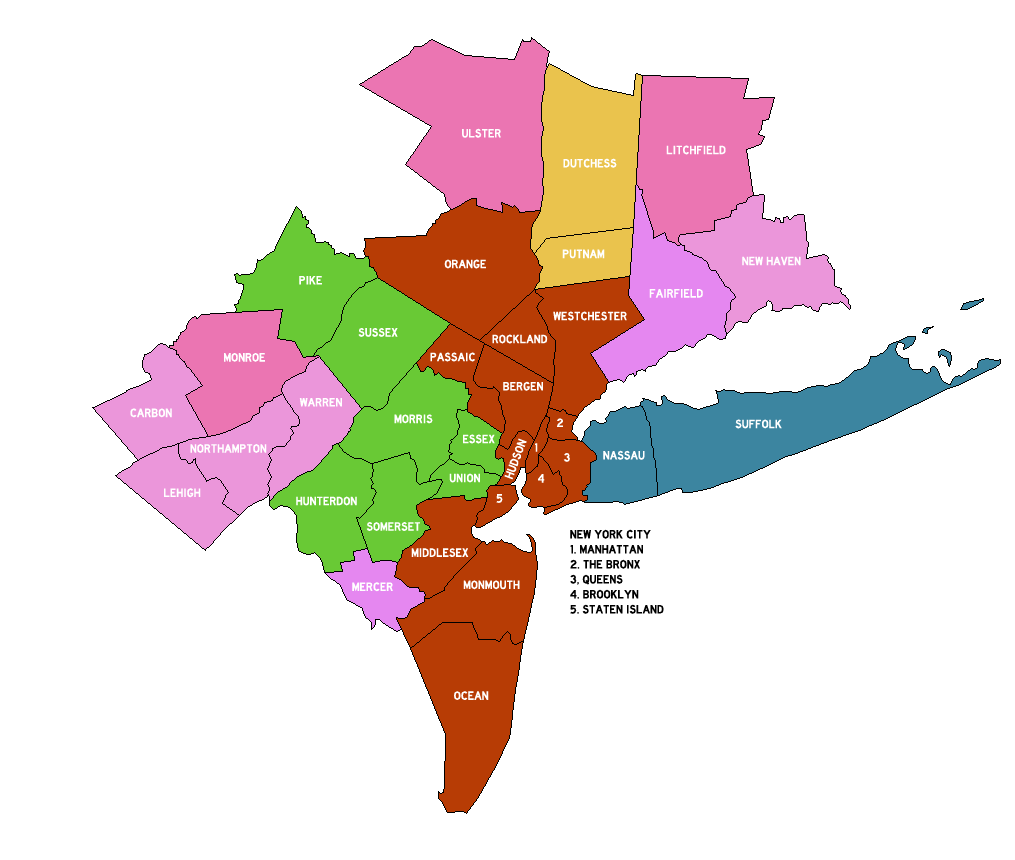
All except the pink/lavender-illustrated counties compose the New York–Northern New Jersey–Long Island NY–NJ–PA Metropolitan statistical area, the most populous in the US: New York–Jersey City–White Plains, NY–NJ Metropolitan Division Dutchess County–Putnam County, NY Metropolitan Division Nassau County–Suffolk County, NY Metropolitan Division Newark, NJ–PA Metropolitan Division Remainder of the New York-Newark, NY–NJ–CT–PA Combined Statistical Area

The New York-Newark-Bridgeport, NY-NJ-CT-PA Combined Statistical Area, consisting of New York City, Long Island, and adjacent areas within New York State, as well as nearby areas within the states of New Jersey (extending to Trenton), Connecticut (extending to Bridgeport), and including Pike County, Pennsylvania, was home to an estimated 711,174 Indian Americans as of the 2013–2017 American Community Survey by the U.S. Census Bureau, comprising by far the largest Indian American population of any metropolitan area in the United States; New York City itself also contains by far the highest Indian American population of any individual city in North America, estimated at 246,454 as of 2017. At least twenty four Indian American enclaves characterized as a Little India have emerged in the New York City metropolitan area. As of December 2019, Indian airline carrier Air India as well as United States airline carrier United Airlines were offering direct flights from the New York City Metropolitan Area to and from Delhi and Mumbai. Delta Air Lines inaugurated non-stop flight service from JFK International Airport to Mumbai in December 2019.

The Indian American population in the New York City metropolitan region was second in its population as an Asian ethnicity only to the approximately 893,697 uniracial Chinese New Yorkers as of 2017. However, while the presence and growth of the Chinese population is focused on New York City and Long Island in New York State, the gravitas of the Indian population is roughly evenly split between New Jersey and New York State.

Central New Jersey, at the geographic heart of the Northeast Megalopolis, has emerged as the largest hub for Indian immigrants to the U.S., followed closely by Queens and Nassau County on Long Island. Oak Tree Road in Edison and Iselin is known as an Indian dining and shopping destination.

Jersey City in New Jersey has the highest proportion of Asian Indians of any major U.S. city, comprising 10.9% of the overall population of Jersey City in 2010, increasing to 11.4% by 2013. Bergen County, New Jersey and Rockland County, New York are home to the highest concentrations of Malayalis outside of India. Carteret, Middlesex County's Punjabi Sikh community, variously estimated at upwards of 3,000, is the largest concentration of Sikhs in New Jersey. Smaller populations of Asian Indians reside in the Connecticut and Pennsylvania portions of the New York City metropolitan region. Monroe Township, Middlesex County, in central New Jersey, the geographic heart of the Northeast megalopolis and ranked the safest small city in the United States, has displayed one of the fastest growth rates of its Indian population in the Western Hemisphere, increasing from 256 (0.9%) as of the 2000 Census to an estimated 5,943 (13.6%) as of 2017, representing a 2,221.5% (a multiple of 23) numerical increase over that period, including many affluent professionals and senior citizens as well as charitable benefactors to the COVID-19 relief efforts in India in official coordination with Monroe Township, in addition to Bollywood actors with second homes. By 2022, the Indian population was approaching one-third of Monroe Township's population, and the nickname Edison-South had developed, in reference to the Little India stature of both townships. A community named Raajipo (meaning happiness) has emerged within nearby Robbinsville, in Mercer County, New Jersey, home of Swaminarayan Akshardham (Devnagari: स्वामिनारायण अक्षरधाम), inaugurated in 2014 as the world's largest Hindu temple. Sikhs have established significant concentrations in Queens and Nassau County in New York and in Middlesex, Bergen, and Hudson counties in New Jersey.

In 2014, 12,350 Indians legally immigrated to the New York-Northern New Jersey-Long Island, NY-NJ-PA core based statistical area; in 2013, this number was 10,818; in 2012, 10,550; 11,256 in 2011; and 11,388 in 2010. These numbers do not include the remainder of the New York-Newark-Bridgeport, NY-NJ-CT-PA Combined Statistical Area. New Jersey is the only U.S. state in which immigrants born in India comprised the largest foreign-born nationality, representing approximately 10% of all foreign-born residents in the state.

=== New York City boroughs ===
As the city proper with the largest Asian Indian population in the United States by a wide margin, with an estimated 227,994 individuals as of the 2014 American Community Survey, and as the primary destination for new Indian immigrants, New York City is subdivided into official municipal boroughs, which themselves are home to significant Asian Indian and other South Asian populations. Note that this list includes neither the large Desi populations of Pakistani Americans, Bangladeshi Americans, and Sri Lankan Americans, nor Indo-Caribbean Americans, Afghan Americans, and others of South Asian origin who make their home in New York City. Punjab Avenue (ਪੰਜਾਬ ਐਵੇਨਿਊ), or Little Punjab, has emerged in Richmond Hill, Queens.

Borough	Indian Americans	Indian Americans per square mile	Percentage of Indian Americans in Borough's Population
Queens (2014)	144,896	1,326.5	6.2
Brooklyn (2012)	25,270	357.9	1.0
Manhattan (2012)	24,359	1,060.9	1.5
The Bronx (2012)	16,748	398.6	1.2
Staten Island (2012)	6,646	113.6	1.4
Total (2014)	227,994	753.4	2.7

=== Medium and small-sized cities, as of 2021 American Community Survey ===
==== New Jersey ====
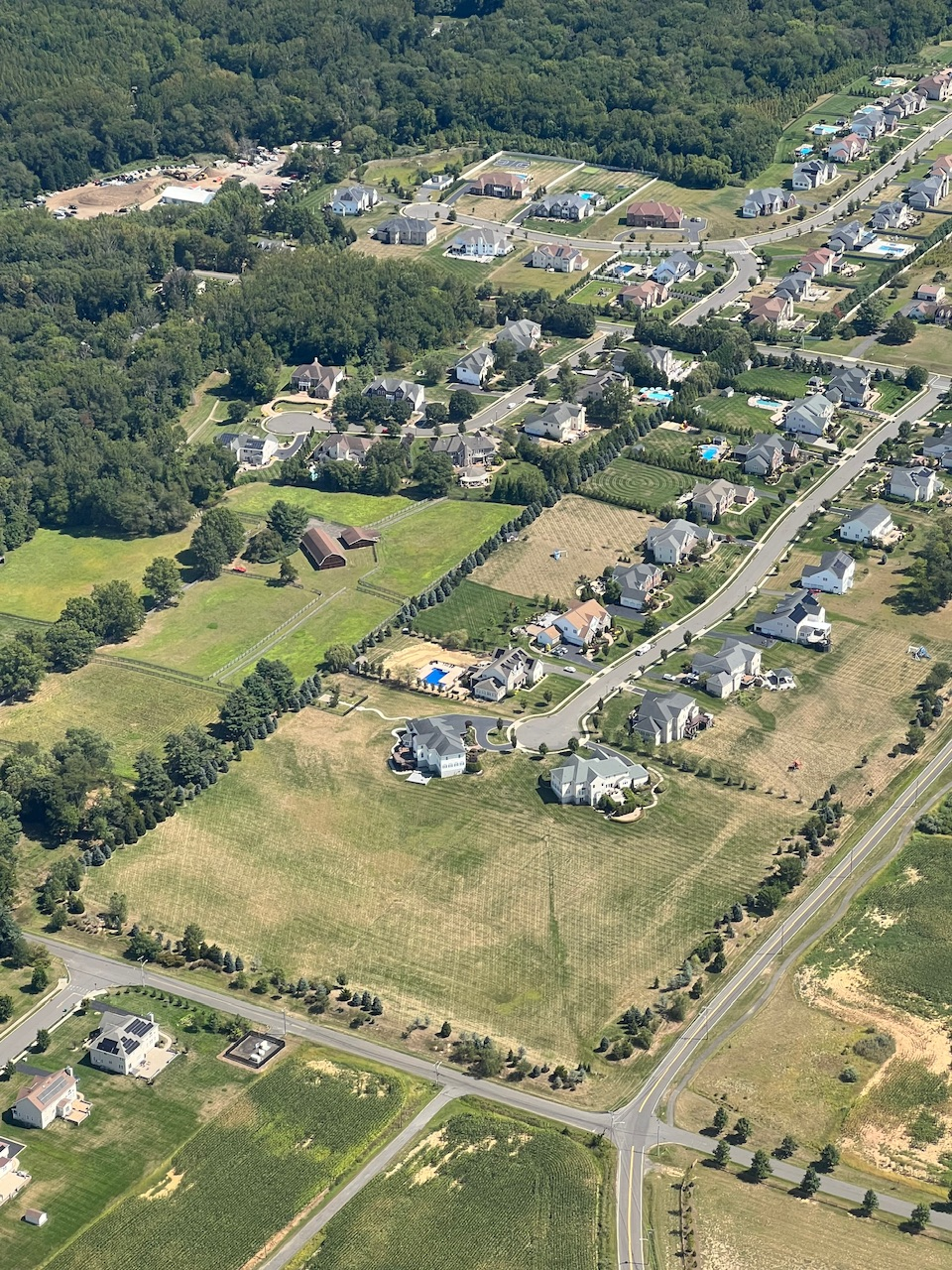
Aerial view of single family homes nestled within natural surroundings of trees and greenbelts in affluent suburban Monroe Township, Middlesex County, New Jersey, while also maintaining the proximity to both New York City and top-ranked Princeton University sought by Indians in this township and the surrounding India corridor of Central New Jersey, with the fastest-growing Indian population in the Western Hemisphere.

New Jersey, and Middlesex County (in Central New Jersey), are home to by far the highest per capita Indian American populations of any U.S. state and U.S. county by 2024, at 4.7% and 16.9%, respectively.

Percent of population with Indian ancestry in 2010. New Jersey stands alone demographically, comprising a population over 4% Indian in 2020.

Community	County	Asian Indian %
Carteret	Middlesex	20.1%
East Windsor	Mercer	16.6%
Edison	Middlesex	36.2%
Franklin	Somerset	14.6%
Iselin CDP	Middlesex	45.1%
Monroe Township	Middlesex	17.7%
North Brunswick	Middlesex	16.5%
Parsippany-Troy Hills	Morris	25.7%
Piscataway	Middlesex	20.2%
Plainsboro Township	Middlesex	44.7%
Robbinsville CDP	Mercer	29.2%
Secaucus	Hudson	22.9%
South Brunswick	Middlesex	37.2%
West Windsor	Mercer	36.4%
Woodbridge	Middlesex	16.7%

==== New York ====
- Nassau County on Long Island has become a major suburban destination for Indians:

Community	Asian Indian %
Bellerose Terrace	11.8%
Garden City Park	18.4%
Herricks	23.5%
Hicksville	18.7%
Manhasset Hills	28.4%
Searingtown	18.1%

=== List of Little Indias ===
==== In New Jersey ====
- Hudson County
  - Bombay, Jersey City, home of India Square
  - Newport, Jersey City
- Mercer County
  - Robbinsville CDP (15.7% Asian Indian)
  - West Windsor (33.8% Asian Indian)
- Middlesex County, with the highest percentage of Asian Indians of any U.S. county, at nearly 20% in 2020
  - Monroe Township, with one of the fastest growth rates of its Indian population in the Western Hemisphere, increasing from 256 (0.9%) as of the 2000 Census to an estimated 4,204 (10.0%) as of 2015, representing a 1,542% (multiple of 16) numerical increase over that period. By 2022, the Indian population was approaching one-third of Monroe Township's population.
  - Oak Tree Road, Edison (36.2% Asian Indian)
  - Oak Tree Road, Iselin (45.1% Asian Indian)
  - Plainsboro (44.7% Asian Indian)
  - Route 27, North Brunswick (16.5% Asian Indian)
  - Route 27, South Brunswick (36.3% Asian Indian)
  - Stelton Road, Piscataway (18.3% Asian Indian)
  - Woodbridge Township (16.7% Asian Indian)
- Morris County
  - Route 46, Parsippany (24.8% Asian Indian)
- Somerset County
  - Bridgewater, in the vicinity of a Hindu temple on the central and western parts of the township

===== Bombay, Jersey City =====
Bombay, in Jersey City, New Jersey, is home to the highest concentration of Asian Indians in the Western Hemisphere, containing the rapidly growing Indian ethnic enclave of India Square. The neighborhood is centered on Newark Avenue, between Tonnele Avenue and JFK Boulevard, and is considered to be part of the larger Journal Square District. It has had a large concentration of Indian businesses since the 1970s, with about 15,000 Indians living in Jersey City by 1986. This area has been home to the largest outdoor Navratri festivities in New Jersey as well as several Hindu temples. This portion of Newark Avenue is lined with grocery stores, electronics vendors, video stores, import/export businesses, clothing stores, and restaurants, and is one of the busier pedestrian areas of this part of the city, often stopping traffic for hours. According to the 2000 census, there were nearly 13,000 Indians living in this two-block stretch of Jersey City, up from 3,000 in 1980, increasing commensurately between 2000 and 2010. An annual, color-filled spring Holi festival has taken place in Jersey City since 1992, centered upon India Square and attracting significant participation and international media attention. Although India Square continues to represent the heart of Little India in Jersey City, situated between Tonnele Avenue and John F. Kennedy Boulevard, Little India itself has been expanding further eastward along Newark Avenue, through Jersey City's Little Manila, to Summit Avenue and the Five Corners neighborhood. After dark, the businesses light flashing signs, and the street crowds continue.

===== Oak Tree Road (Edison/Iselin) =====
Oak Tree Road is a rapidly growing South Asian-focused commercial strip in Middlesex County, New Jersey, the U.S. county with highest concentration of Asian Indians (nearly 20% in 2020) and the geographic heart of the Northeast megalopolis. The Oak Tree Road strip runs for about one-and-a-half miles through Edison and neighboring Iselin, New Jersey, near the area's sprawling Chinatown and Koreatown. Little India in Edison and Iselin is the largest and most diverse South Asian cultural hub in the United States. The zone is home to over 400 South Asian establishments and businesses, including dining, apparel and electronics retailing, and entertainment. Over 60 Indian and Pakistani restaurants alone are found in the area. In Middlesex County, election ballots are printed in Gujarati, Hindi, and Punjabi as well. Edison was, per 2010 American Community Survey census data, 28.3% ethnic Asian Indian population, the highest percentage for any municipality in the United States. According to the 2017 American Community Survey, 42.6% of Iselin residents identified themselves as being Indian American, the highest percentage for any census-designated place in the United States.

==== In New York ====
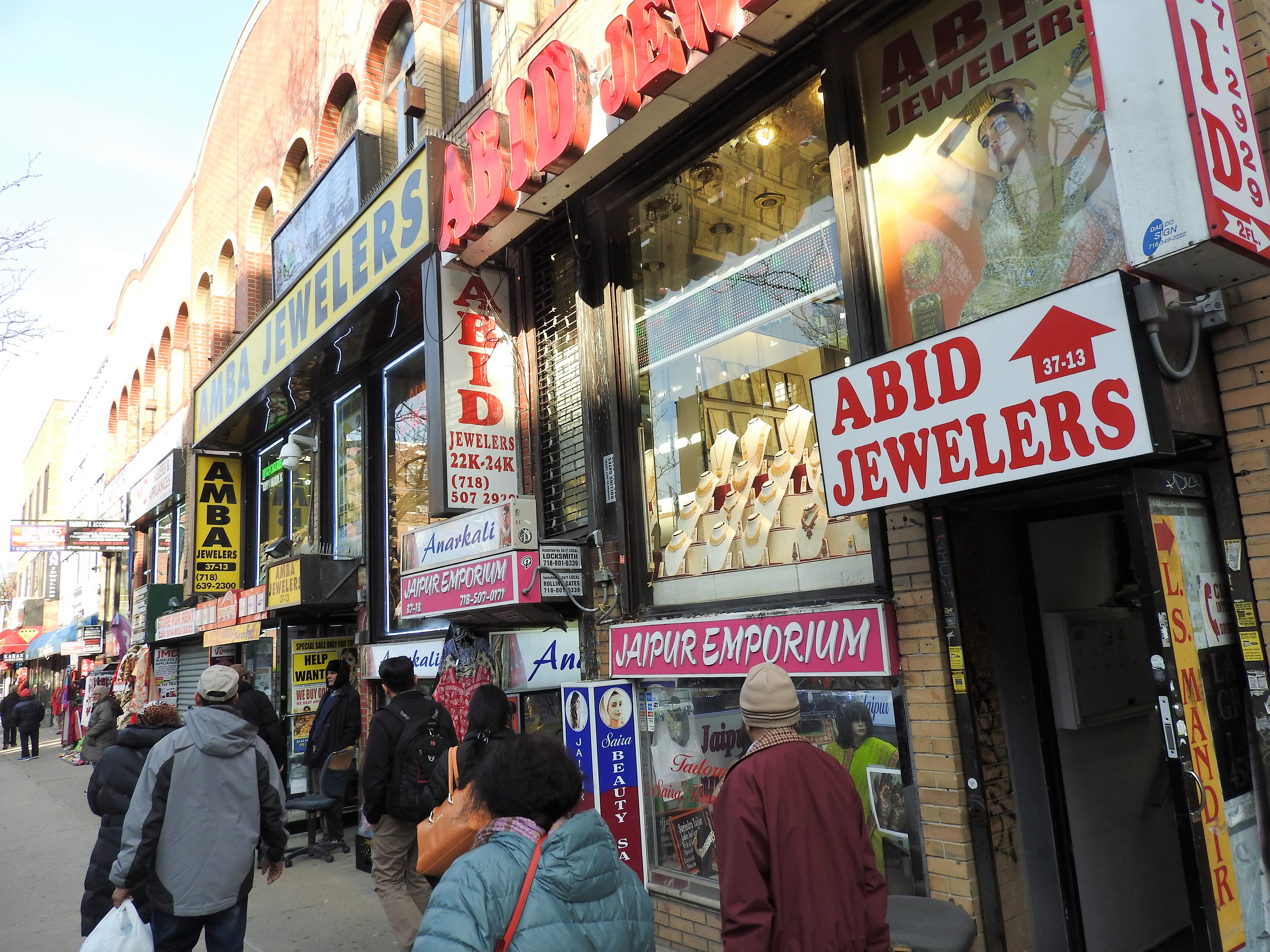
Little India on 74th Street in Jackson Heights, Queens

- Nassau County, Long Island
  - Bellerose Terrace; Broadway/Route 107, Old Country Road, Hicksville; Garden City Park; Herricks; Manhasset Hills; Searingtown
- New York City With over 700,000 Indo Americans, the New York City Metropolitan Area contains the largest metropolitan Asian Indian population in the Western Hemisphere.
  - Manhattan
    - Lexington Avenue, in the neighborhoods of Rose Hill and Murray Hill in Midtown Manhattan, between 25th and 30th Streets (growing preponderance of South Indian cuisine), has become known as Curry Hill, developing rapidly as Manhattan's Indian population nearly doubled between the 2000 and 2010 Census and has continued to increase, to a Census-estimated 27,289 in 2013.
    - East 6th Street, in the East Village of Lower Manhattan, between 1st and 2nd Avenues, with many North Indian restaurants, and known as Curry Row.
  - Queens
    - Flushing, in the vicinity of the Hindu Temple Society of North America
    - Hillside Avenue, Bellerose Manor
    - Hillside Avenue, Floral Park
    - Hillside Avenue, Glen Oaks
    - Hillside Avenue, Jamaica
    - 73rd and 74th Streets between Roosevelt and 37th Avenues, Jackson Heights
    - Punjab Avenue (ਪੰਜਾਬ ਐਵੇਨਿਊ), Richmond Hill (Little Punjab)

== Demographics ==
=== Language ===
South Asian Language Spoken at Home for the Population 5 Years and Over in the New York Metropolitan Area (2016–2023)
Language	2023		2016		Change	
Language	Pop.	%	Pop.	%	±	±%
Gujarati	94,864	0.51%	89,659	0.47%	5,205	5.81%
Hindi	129,002	0.7%	119,466	0.63%	9,536	7.98%
Urdu	102,455	0.56%	88,880	0.47%	13,575	15.27%
Punjabi	35,570	0.19%	48,772	0.26%	-13,202	−27.07%
Bengali	165,106	0.9%	133,242	0.7%	31,864	23.91%
Nepali, Marathi, or other Indic languages	46,727	0.25%	46,010	0.24%	717	1.56%
Telugu	38,135	0.21%	33,084	0.17%	5,051	15.27%
Tamil	33,422	0.18%	30,149	0.16%	3,273	10.86%
Malayalam, Kannada, or other Dravidian languages	40,937	0.22%	42,195	0.22%	-1,258	−2.98%
Total South Asian languages	686,218	3.72%	631,457	3.34%	54,761	8.67%
Total responses	18,423,457	100%	18,933,254	100%	-509,797	−2.69%

== Business ==
Indians have had a long history of commerce in the United States. In the late 19th and early 20th centuries, many Indians in the United States began to focus on tourism as a source of income. Many opened businesses, such as hotels and Indian grocery stores. Today, Indian-owned businesses in the United States include various enterprises, ranging from small retailers and service providers to large corporations. Indian Americans have increasingly taken on CEO positions of companies in the greater New York metropolitan area.

Patel Brothers is the world's large supermarket chain serving the Indian diaspora, with 57 locations in 19 U.S. states—primarily located in the New Jersey/New York Metropolitan Area, due to its large Indian population, and with the East Windsor/Monroe Township, New Jersey location representing the world's largest and busiest Indian grocery store outside India, leading to expansion to nearby Hamilton, New Jersey, also in Mercer County (Greater Princeton). HOS Global Foods, one of the largest purveyors of Indian and other South Asian foods outside of Asia, is globally headquartered in Lake Success, New York, in Nassau County, on Long Island. Indian food trucks have set up shop in Manhattan, Queens, and Long Island, and in Jersey City, Edison, and Monroe Township, New Jersey.

In January 2025, Hackensack Meridian Health, New Jersey's largest health care system, signed a partnership agreement with Apollo Hospitals, India's largest private hospital network, to collaborate and innovate new health care solutions that could be implemented in both countries. Their goal is to leverage both systems' combined resources to improve patient outcomes.

=== Food companies ===
Patel Brothers is a supermarket chain serving the Indian diaspora, with 57 locations in 19 U.S. states—primarily located in the New Jersey/New York Metropolitan Area]], attributable to its large Indian population, and with the East Windsor/Monroe Township, New Jersey location representing the world's largest and busiest Indian grocery store outside India, the store has therefore expanded to nearby Hamilton, New Jersey.

Deep Foods, founded in 1977 and based in Union Township, New Jersey, is one of the largest Indian food companies in the US. Specializing in frozen Indian food, their products were sold in around 20,000 stores as of 2024.

=== Biopharma companies ===
Dr. Reddy's Laboratories, Aurobindo Pharma, Sun Pharma, and Biocon Biologics, all biopharmaceutical companies based in South India or Western India, have established North American headquarters in central New Jersey.

=== IT Services companies ===
Tata Consultancy Services U.S. headquarters is based in Edison, New Jersey, with offices in New York City. Cognizant is headquartered in Teaneck, New Jersey, while Wipro is based in East Brunswick, New Jersey.

== Culture ==
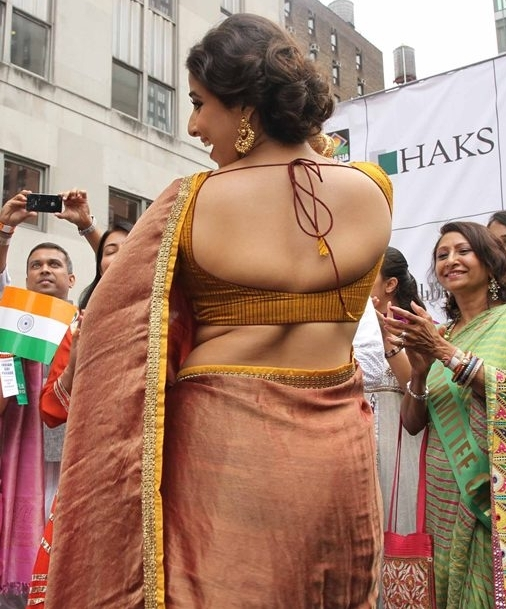
New York City's annual India Day Parade, the world's largest Indian Independence Day parade outside India, marches down Madison Avenue in Midtown Manhattan. The parade addresses controversial themes, including racism, sexism, corruption, and Bollywood.

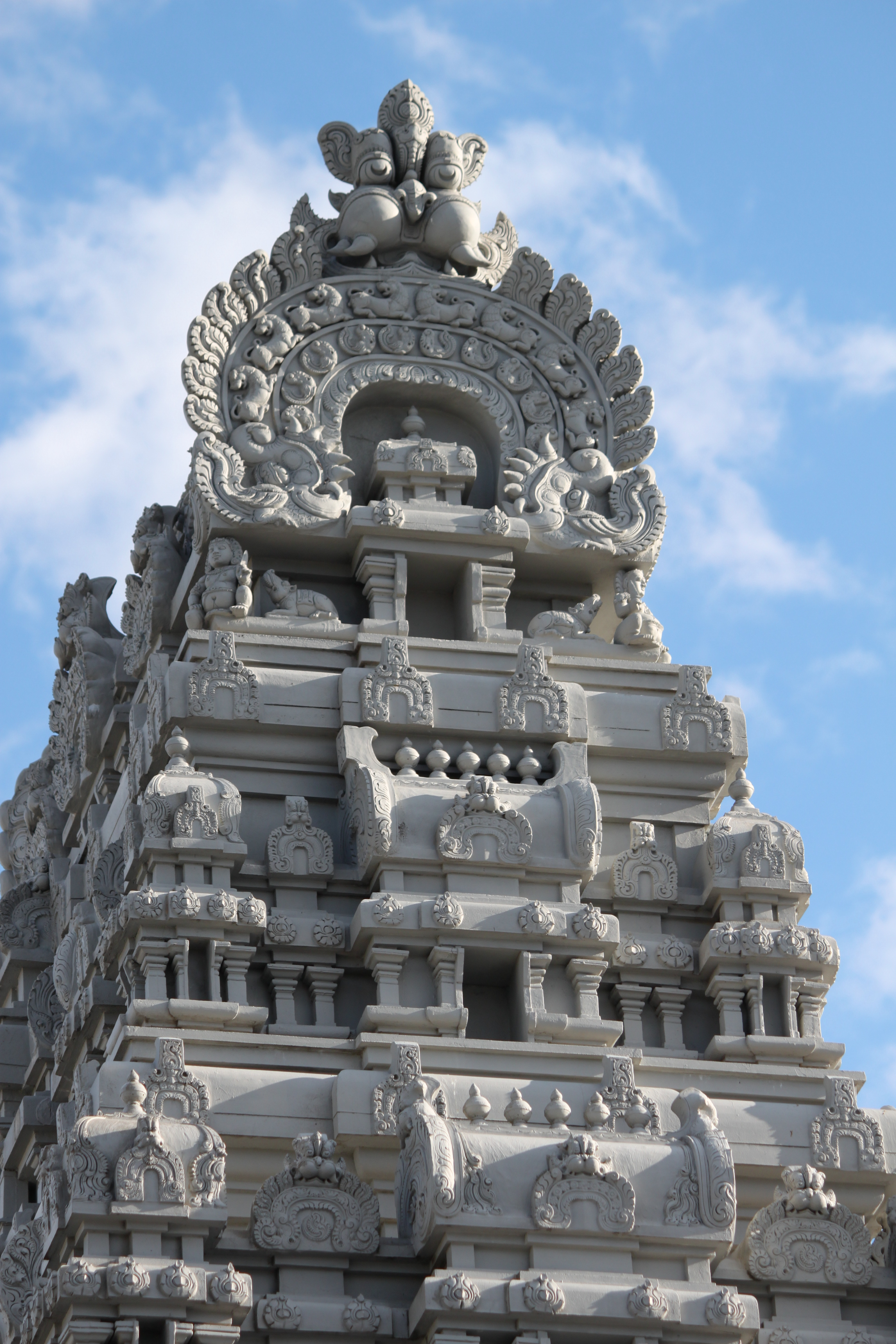
The Hindu Temple Society of North America, representing Sri Maha Vallabha Ganapati Devasthanam is the oldest Hindu temple in the Western Hemisphere, in Flushing, Queens, above. Further east on Long Island, in Melville, one of the world's largest BAPS temples opened in October 2016;

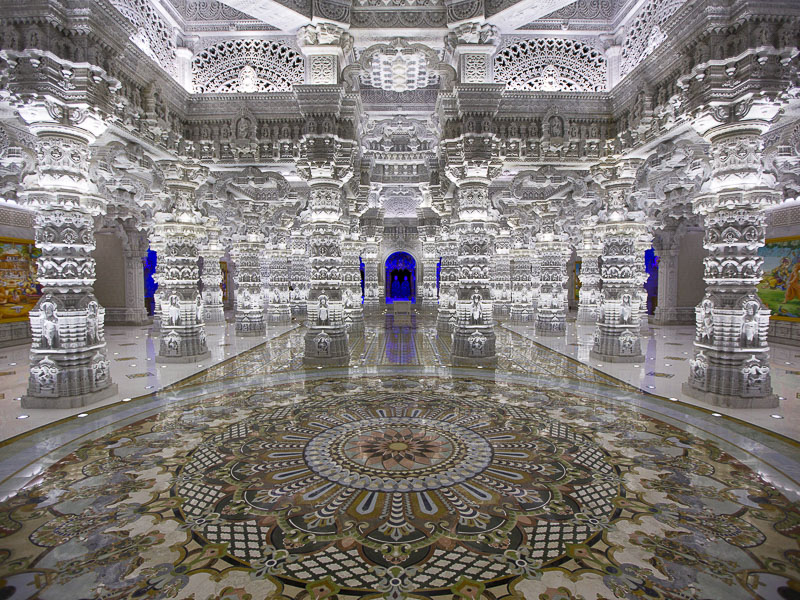
Swaminarayan Akshardham (Devnagari: स्वामिनारायण अक्षरधाम) in Robbinsville, Mercer County, New Jersey, inaugurated in 2014 as the world's largest Hindu temple, above.

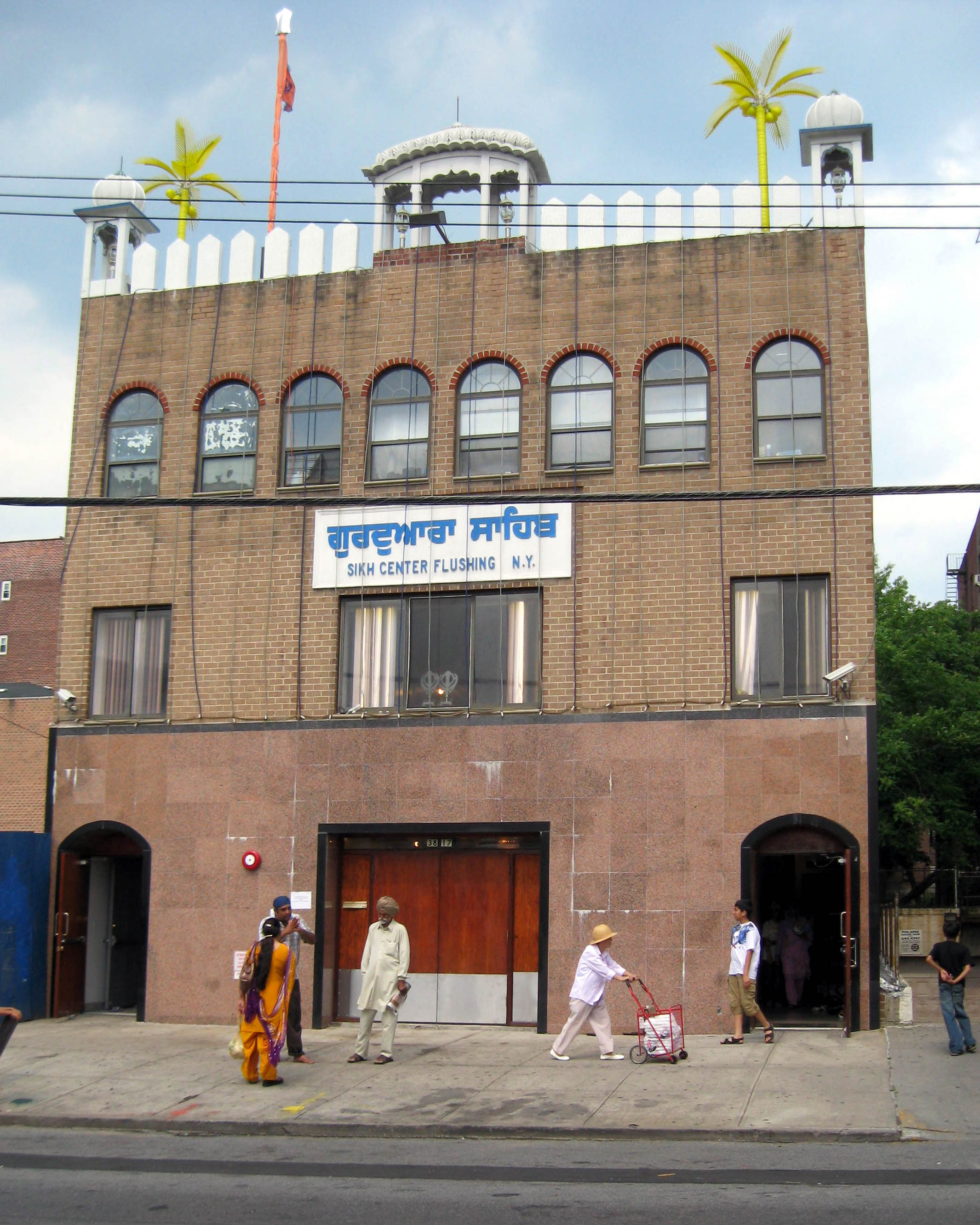
Sikh Center in Flushing, Queens

=== Attraction to Education ===
Indians have been attaining school board membership positions on various boards of education in New Jersey and on Long Island. Indian parents are attracted to settling in cities and towns in the New York metropolitan area that have highly performing school districts; there is especially an allure for Indian parents to settle in the proximity of top-ranked Princeton University, in the central New Jersey communities near Princeton, including most of Mercer, Middlesex, and Somerset counties.

==== Deepavali/Diwali, Eid/Ramadan as school holidays ====
Momentum has been growing to recognize the Hindu holy day Deepavali (Diwali) as a holiday on school district calendars in the New York City metropolitan region. New York City announced in October 2022 that Diwali would be an official school holiday commencing in 2023, and this was codified into New York State law in 2023.

Passaic, New Jersey established Diwali as a school holiday in 2005. South Brunswick, New Jersey in 2010 became the first of the many school districts with large Indian student populations in Middlesex County in New Jersey to add Diwali to the school calendar. Glen Rock, New Jersey in February 2015 became the first municipality in Bergen County, with its own burgeoning Indian population post-2010, to recognize Diwali as an annual school holiday.

Efforts have been undertaken in Millburn, Monroe Township, West Windsor-Plainsboro, Bernards Township, and North Brunswick, New Jersey, Long Island, as well as in New York City, among other school districts in the metropolitan region, to make Diwali a holiday on the school calendar. According to the Star-Ledger, Edison, New Jersey councilman Sudhanshu Prasad has noted parents' engagement in making Deepavali a holiday there; while in Jersey City, the four schools with major Asian Indian populations mark the holiday by inviting parents to the school buildings for festivities. Mahatma Gandhi Elementary School is located in Passaic, New Jersey. Efforts are also progressing toward making Diwali and Eid official holidays at all 24 school districts in Middlesex County. At least 12 school districts on Long Island closed for Diwali in 2022, and over 20 in New Jersey.

In March 2015, New York City Mayor Bill de Blasio officially declared the Muslim holy days Eid al-Fitr and Eid al-Adha holidays on the school calendar. School districts in Paterson and South Brunswick, New Jersey observe Ramadan.

=== Beaches ===
The beaches of the Jersey Shore and Long Island have become popular recreational destinations for Indians in the New York City metropolitan region.

=== Indian Independence Day Parade ===
The annual New York City India Day Parade, held on or approximately every August 15 since 1981, is the world's largest Indian Independence Day parade outside of India and is hosted by The Federation of Indian Associations (FIA). According to the website of Baruch College of the City University of New York, "The FIA, which came into being in 1970 is an umbrella organization meant to represent the diverse Indian population of NYC. Its mission is to promote and further the interests of its 500,000 members and to collaborate with other Indian cultural organization. The FIA acts as a mouth piece for the diverse Indian-Asian population in the United States, and is focused on furthering the interests of this diverse community. The parade begins on East 38th Street and continues down Madison Avenue in Midtown Manhattan until it reaches 28th Street. At the review stand on 28th Street, the grand marshal and various celebrities greet onlookers. Throughout the parade, participants find themselves surrounded by the saffron, white and green colors of the Indian flag. They can enjoy Indian food, merchandise booths, live dancing and music present at the Parade. After the parade is over, various cultural organizations and dance schools participate in program on 23rd Street and Madison Avenue until 6PM." The New York/New Jersey metropolitan region's second-largest India Independence Day parade takes place in Little India, Edison/Iselin in Middlesex County, New Jersey, annually in August. Governor of New York Kathy Hochul officially declared August 15, 2022 to be India Independence Day in New York; the governor lauded the accomplishments of Indian Americans in a speech that began with "Namaste" and concluded with "Jai Hind".

==== Sikh Day Visakhi Parade ====
The world's largest Sikh Day Parade outside India celebrating Vaisakhi and the season of renewal is held in Manhattan annually in April. The parade is widely regarded as being one of the most colourful parades.

=== Arts, entertainment, and media ===
In September 2014, approximately 19,000 Indian Americans attended a speech delivered onstage by Indian Prime Minister Narendra Modi at Madison Square Garden in Midtown Manhattan. This appearance was televised live worldwide and was estimated to have been watched by a billion-strong global audience of Indians in India and overseas. The annual Miss India USA pageant is headquartered in New York City and is often held in Middlesex County, New Jersey or on Long Island. In February 2022, an electronic billboard in Times Square sponsored by the Binder Indian Cultural Center featured a tribute to the late singer Lata Mangeshkar, known as "The Nightingale of India". In the 2023 film Spider-Man: Across the Spider-Verse, the fictional world of Mumbattan (portmanteau of Mumbai and Manhattan) is introduced.

==== News publications in English ====
- India Abroad
- Little India
- News India Times
- The Indian American
- The South Asian Times
- Tiranga in New Jersey

=== Languages ===
Indians in New York and New Jersey, as in the United States as a whole, are highly fluent in English. However, Hindi (हिन्दी), Gujarati (ગુજરાતી), Marathi (मराठी), Punjabi (ਪੰਜਾਬੀ), Bengali (বাংলা), Tamil (தமிழ்), Telugu (తెలుగు), Malayalam (മലയാളം), Kannada (ಕನ್ನಡ), and Maithili (मैथिली) languages are spoken at home and with local media incorporating these languages available for viewership. In Middlesex County, New Jersey, election ballots are printed in English, Spanish, Bengali, Gujarati, Hindi, and Punjabi.

=== Cuisine ===
Indian cuisine is very popular in the New York City metropolitan region, bolstered by the growth of the Asian Indian populace and accompanied by growth in the number of Indian restaurants, located both within and outside of traditional Indian enclaves; such that within New York City proper alone, there are hundreds of Indian restaurants. According to David Shaftel of The New York Times in December 2014, the food at New York City's many Indian chain restaurants is worthy of their flagships in India; the Midtown Manhattan neighborhood south of Murray Hill, namely Rose Hill, has been nicknamed Curry Hill, and provides an abundance of multinational India-based chains specializing in South Indian cuisine. In 2020, CNN Travel claimed that the best Indian food in the United States could be found in Jersey City's India Square.

In 1968, a family of Bengali brothers inaugurated the restaurant Shah Bag at 320 East 6th Street in the East Village of Lower Manhattan, followed by others, with the intention of "making an Indian street". In time, this stretch of East 6th Street between First and Second Avenues evolved the nickname Curry Row, with a dense collection of North Indian restaurants.

By 2000, Indian food had become ubiquitous in the New York metropolitan area, both inside and outside of Little Indias, with dhabas popping up around the metro area. These dhabas would serve a quickly growing niche of Indian quick-service food, with a particular appeal to Indians working in professions such as a trucking, taxi-driving, importing, and garment dealers. Indian was also getting more attention from the mainstream American press, with some of these dhabas getting reviews from outlets such as The New York Times.

=== Religion ===
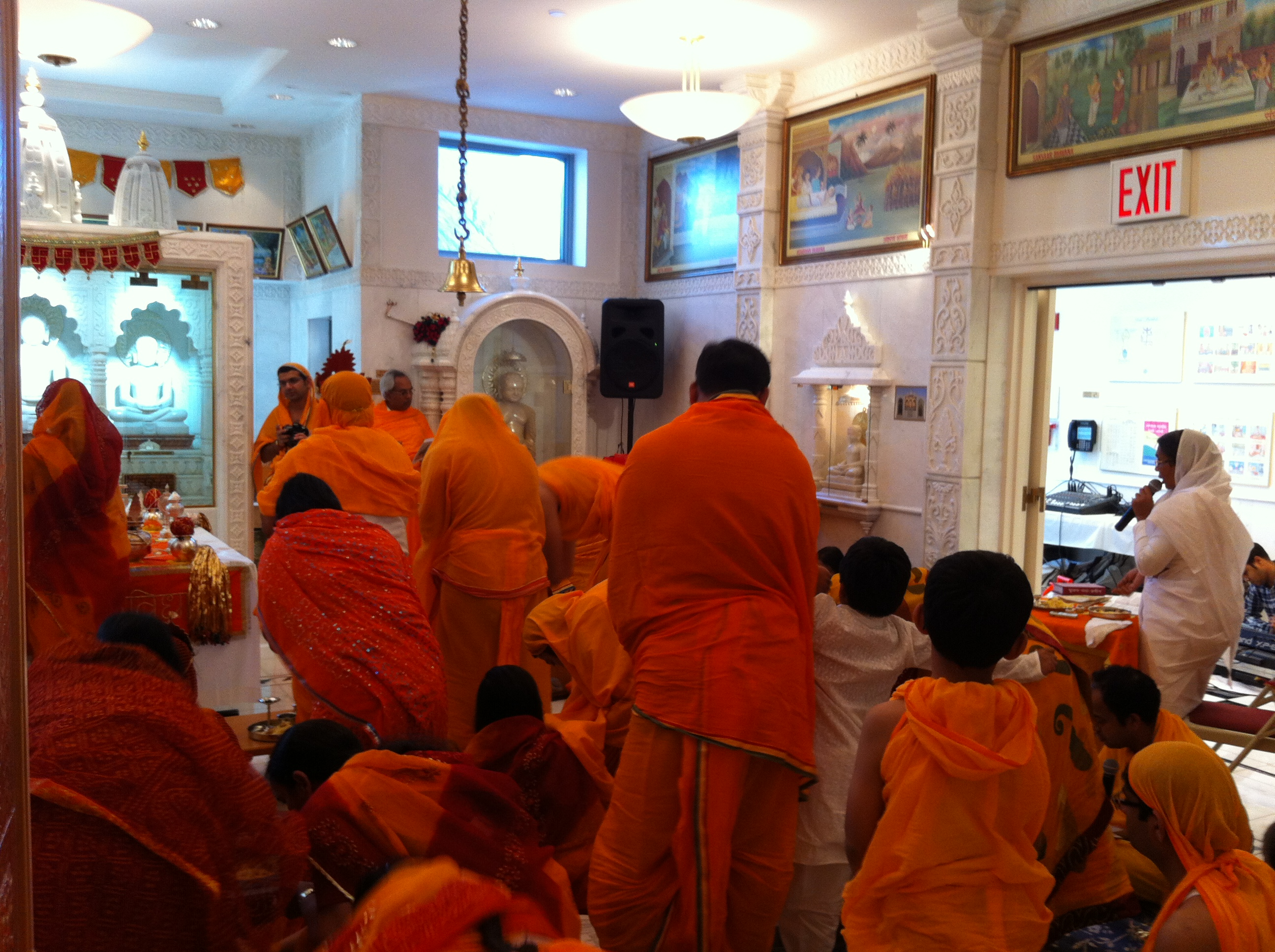
Das Lakshana (Paryushana) celebrations at the Jain Center of America in Elmhurst, Queens, the oldest Jain temple in the Western Hemisphere

Parallelling India's religious constituency, most Indians in the New York City metropolitan region practice Hinduism, followed by Islam, Christianity, Sikhism, Buddhism, Jainism, Zoroastrianism, and irreligion. On October 30, 2024, the State of New Jersey legally designated October of every year to be Hindu Heritage Month. The Hindu Temple Society of North America in Flushing, Queens, is the oldest Hindu temple in the Western Hemisphere, and its canteen feeds 4,000 people a week, with as many as 10,000 during the Diwali (Deepavali) holiday. Further east on Long Island, in Melville, one of the world's largest BAPS temples opened in October 2016. Central New Jersey has large temples of Venkateswara and Guruvayurappan in Bridgewater and Morganville, respectively; and Sai Baba mandirs abound throughout the metropolitan area, the two largest both being in Middlesex County, New Jersey, in Monroe Township (also the largest Sai mandir in the Western Hemisphere) and in Edison, bookending the southern and northern ends of Middlesex County, respectively.

BAPS also built the world's largest Hindu temple in Robbinsville, Mercer County, in Central New Jersey. Numerous mosques, churches (geared significantly toward a Keralite membership), Sikh gurudwaras, and Jain temples are also situated in the New York City metropolitan area. The Jain Center of America in Elmhurst, Queens is the oldest Jain temple in the Western Hemisphere Many retailers now market Diwali fireworks in the New York City metropolitan region and especially in New Jersey. In September 2021, the State of New Jersey aligned with the World Hindu Council to declare October as Hindu Heritage Month. while thousands in Bergen County celebrated the first U.S. county-wide Diwali Mela festival under a unified sponsorship banner in 2016, while Fair Lawn in Bergen County, New Jersey has celebrated an internationally prominent annual Holi celebration since 2022, and in 2023 declared October to be acknowledged as Hindu-American Awareness and Appreciation Month. Diwali/Deepavali is also recognized by many other municipalities throughout the metropolitan area. The largest Lord Hanuman statue in the US arrived in Monroe Township in January 2024.

=== Cricket ===
Cricket is one of the fastest-growing sports in the New York City metropolitan region. In 2016, a public park was expanded in Monroe Township, Middlesex County in central New Jersey to accommodate a designated cricket pitch, among other recreational facilities. There are similar facilities available in Mercer County Park in West Windsor. Overall, there are 56 cricket grounds in New Jersey and fields in all five boroughs of New York. In 2023, Monroe Township High School launched the first high school cricket team.

=== Cockroach Janata Party protests ===
In July 2026, protests with crowds numbering over 500 people took place in Manhattan as proxies in solidarity with the newly founded Cockroach Janta Party in India. The protests were held to demonstrate on behalf of the young people of India who felt that the Indian government was acting dictatorially by trying to suppress free speech and dissent opposing the political and economic policies of the government as they pertained to young people.

== Economic developments ==
Indian pharmaceutical and technology companies are coming to New Jersey to gain a foothold in the United States. Dr. Reddy's Laboratories, based in Hyderabad, set up its North American headquarters in Princeton, New Jersey. Biocon Biologics, based in Bengaluru, has established its North American headquarters in Bridgewater, New Jersey in 2025. Kitex Garments, based in Kerala and India's largest children's clothing manufacturer, opened its first U.S. office in Montvale, New Jersey in October 2015. Pharmaceutical company Aurobindo, also headquartered in Hyderabad, has established its U.S. headquarters in the Dayton section of South Brunswick, Middlesex County, New Jersey, and has implemented a multimillion-dollar expansion of these Central New Jersey operations. In March 2023, Bengaluru-based technology services and consulting company Wipro opened its American international headquarters in East Brunswick, Middlesex, County, New Jersey.

Much like other immigrant groups in the US, Indians have established themselves in a variety of different small businesses in the New York area, with South Asians owning 40% of the gas stations in New York City by the early 1990s and also owning many of New York's newsstands by the mid-1980s. South Asians also make up 50% of New York's taxicab drivers, with Indians such as Bhairavi Desai playing a prominent role in organizing cabbies from the 1990s to the present.

== Airline connections with India and the Indian diaspora ==
A majority of Indian Americans in the New York region are recent immigrants or children of such from India. In that context, travel between the United States and India has developed strong cultural connections, and, in more recent years, business traffic for expatriates. Air India operates nonstop flights from New York JFK and Newark EWR to both Delhi and Mumbai. United Airlines also operates a nonstop flight from Newark to Delhi. Meanwhile, Singapore Airlines flies to Changi International Airport in Singapore, where Tamil is one of the official state languages, both from Newark and New York (with two of the longest non-stop flights in the world). In May 2019, Delta Air Lines announced non-stop flight service between JFK and Mumbai, to begin on December 22, 2019 but suspended the route in March 2020 at the start of the COVID-19 pandemic. American Airlines started operating nonstop service from JFK to Delhi in November 2021.

American Airlines' non-stop flight service codeshares with IndiGo between New York JFK and Delhi, which began in June 2022. In October 2021, Vistara secured aircraft landing slots at Newark. In 2023, United Airlines announced it would be doubling its non-stop flight service between Newark and Delhi with two daily non-stop flights beginning in October 2023.

== Notable people ==
=== Arts and culture ===
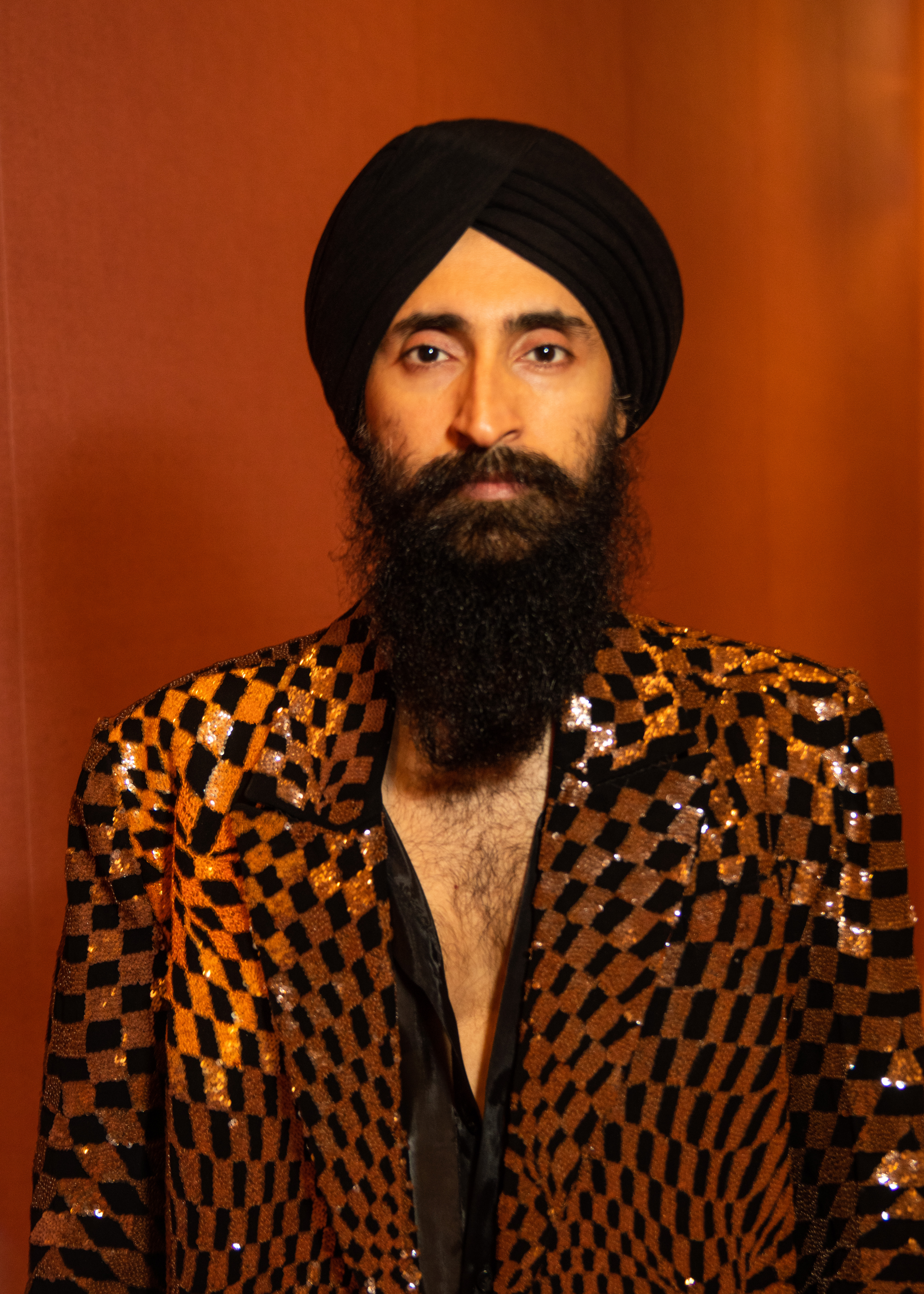
Waris Ahluwalia

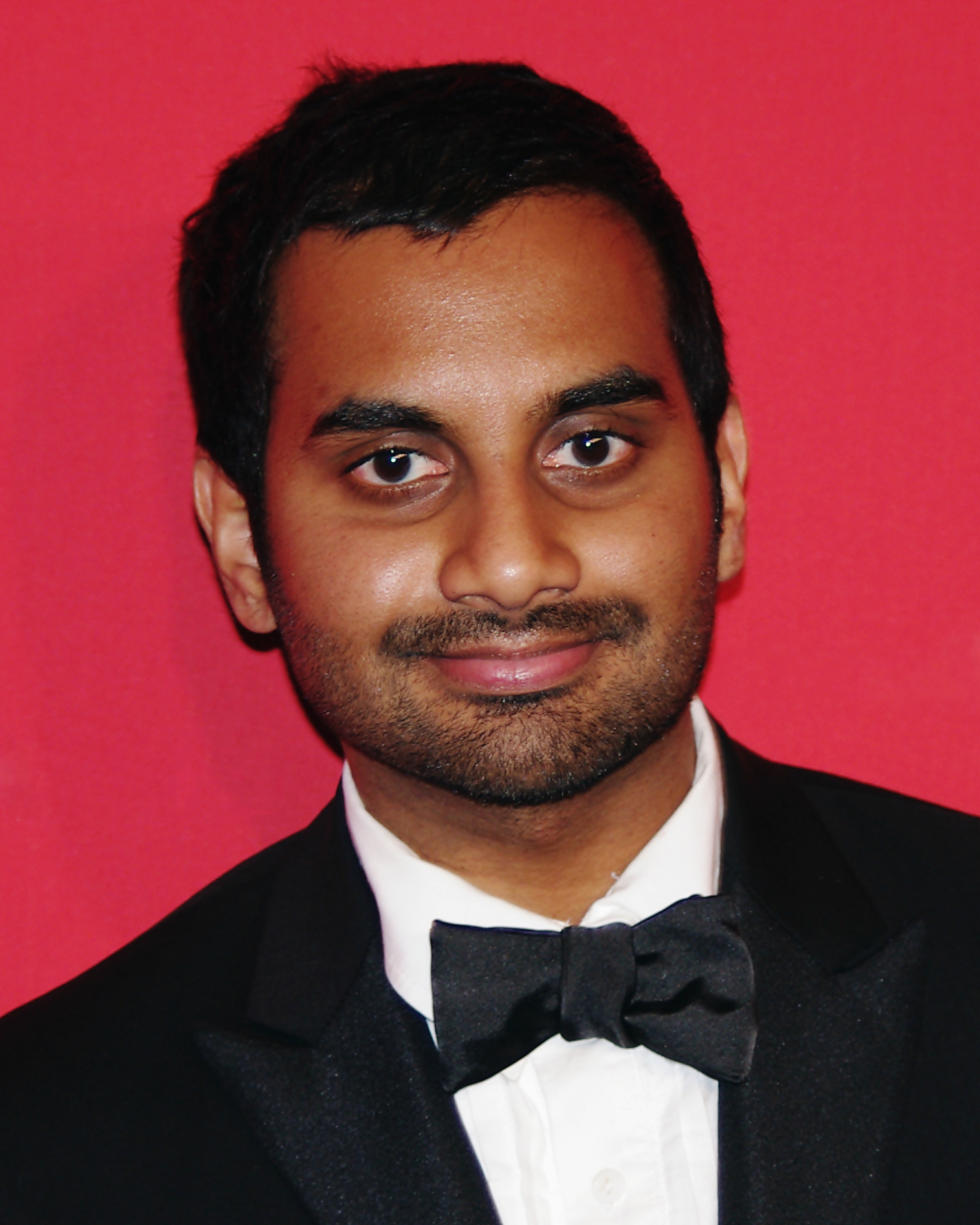
Aziz Ansari

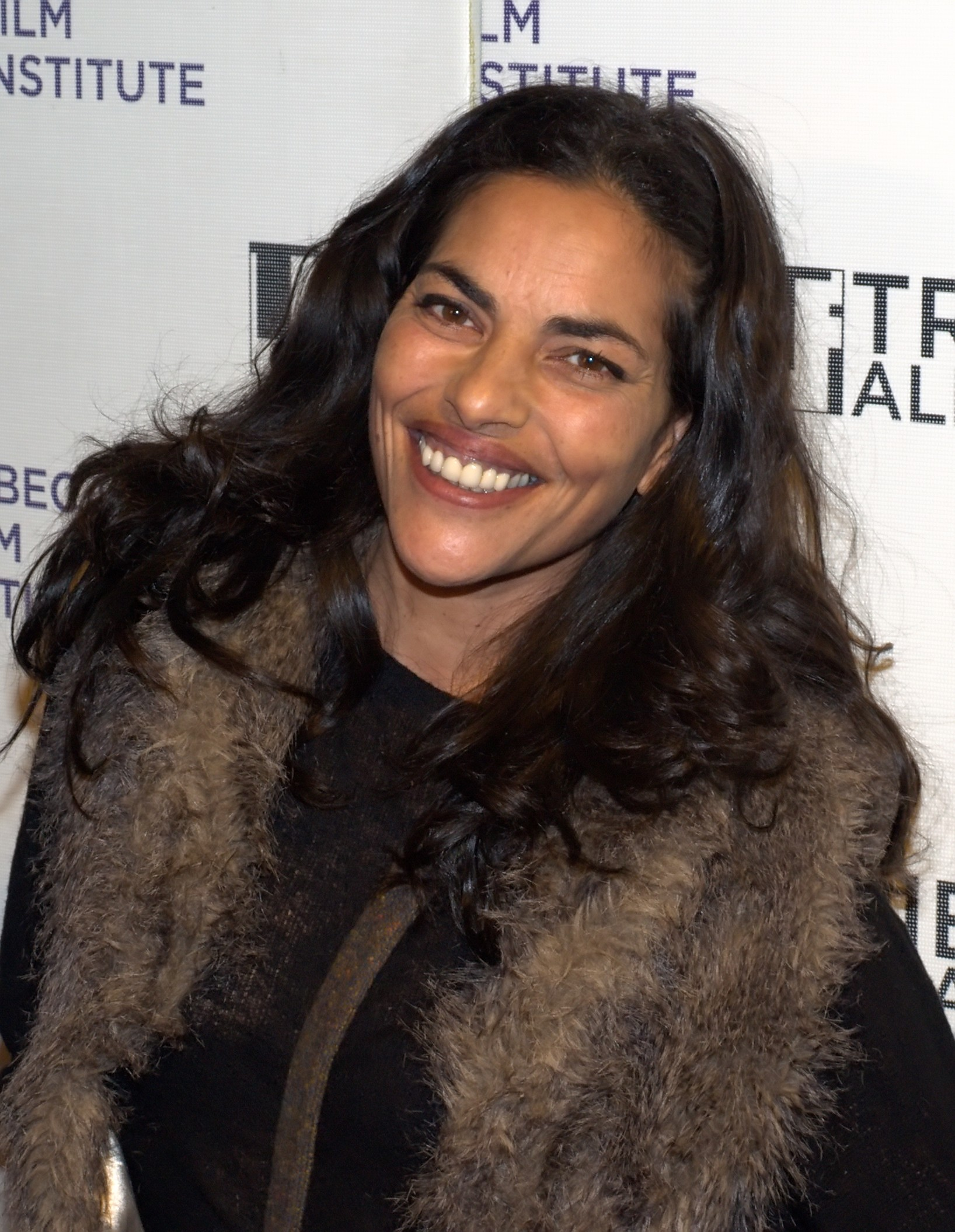
Sarita Choudhury

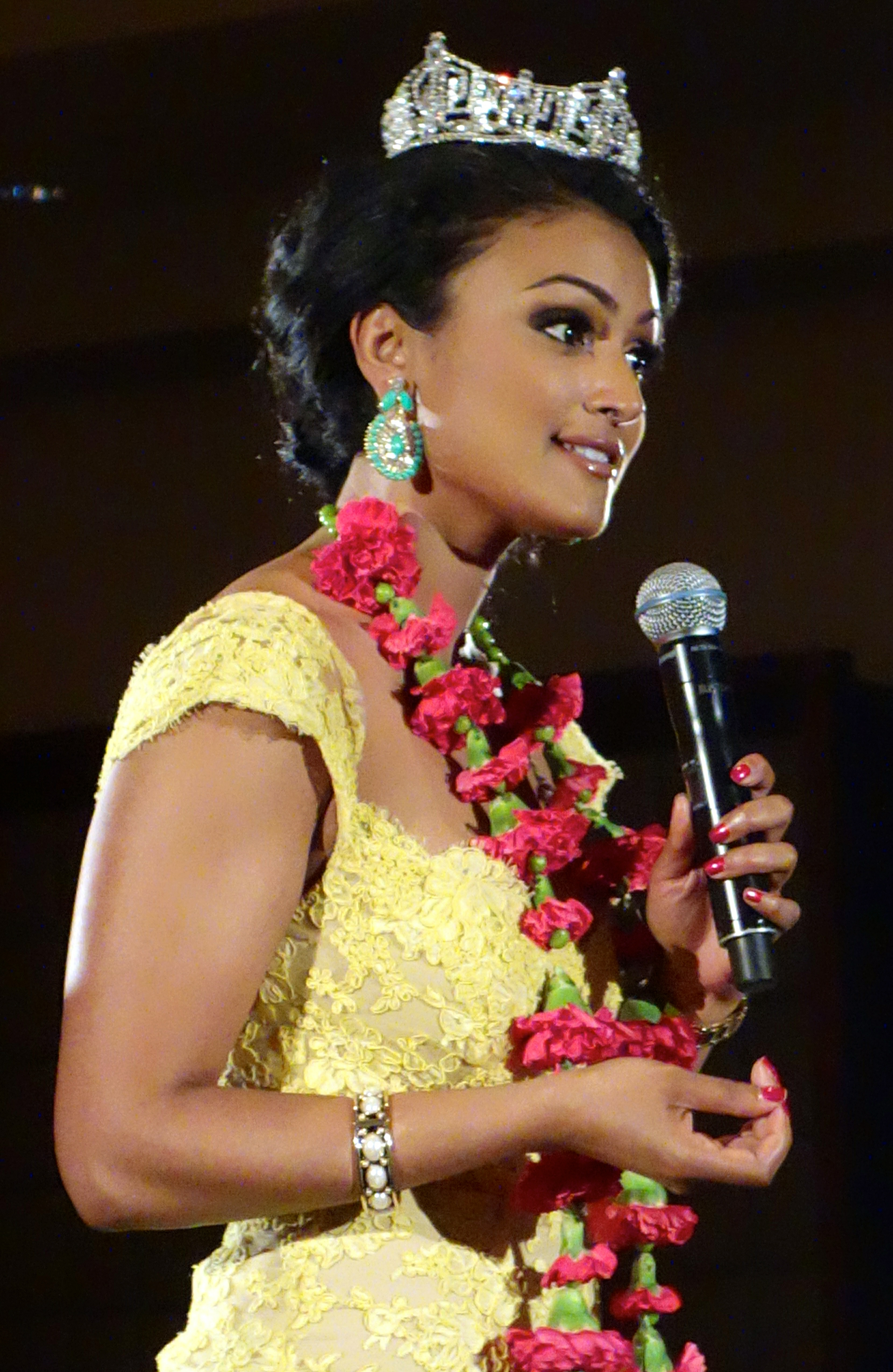
Nina Davuluri

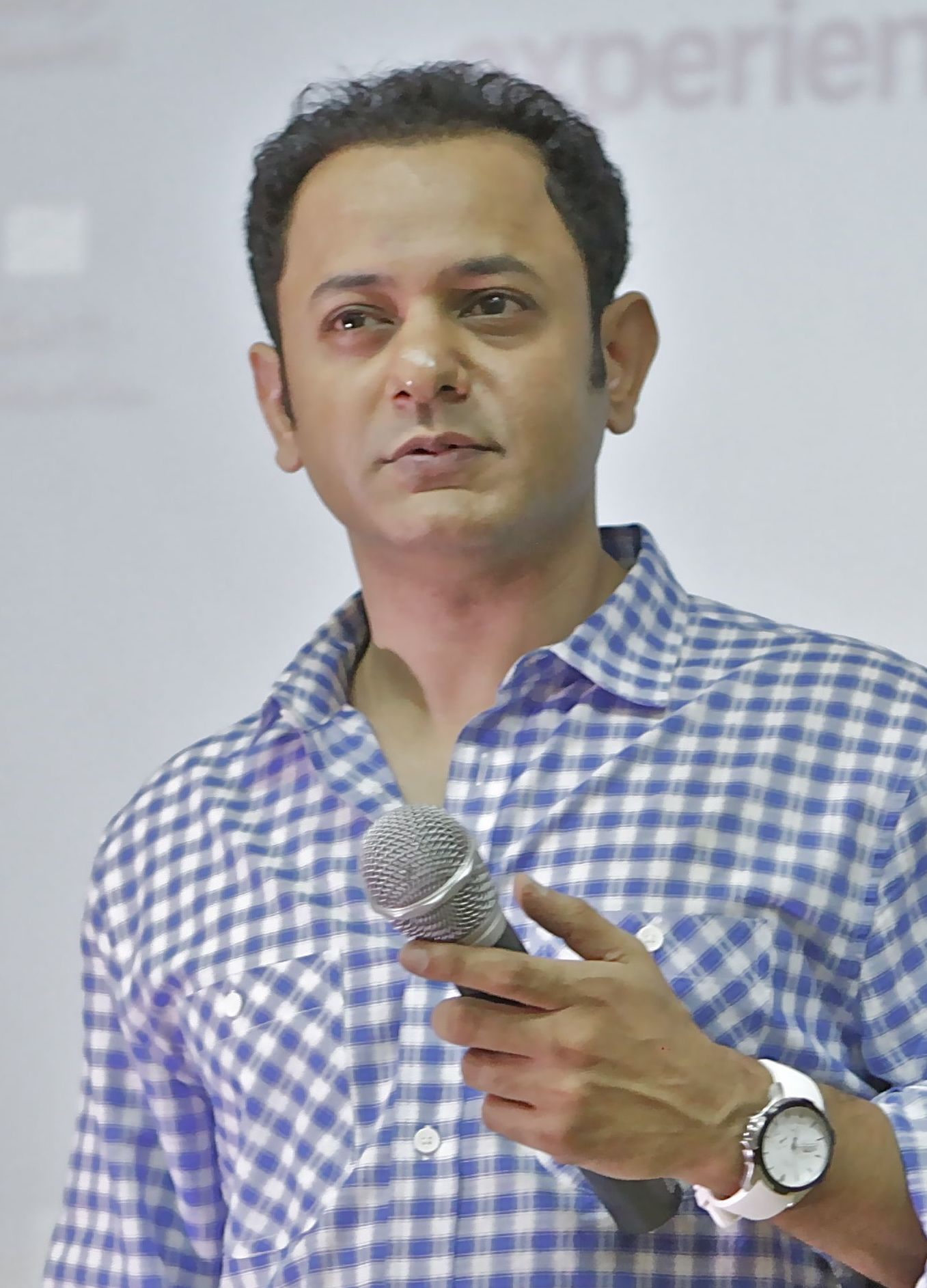
Rohit Gupta

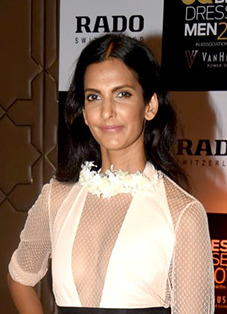
Poorna Jagannathan

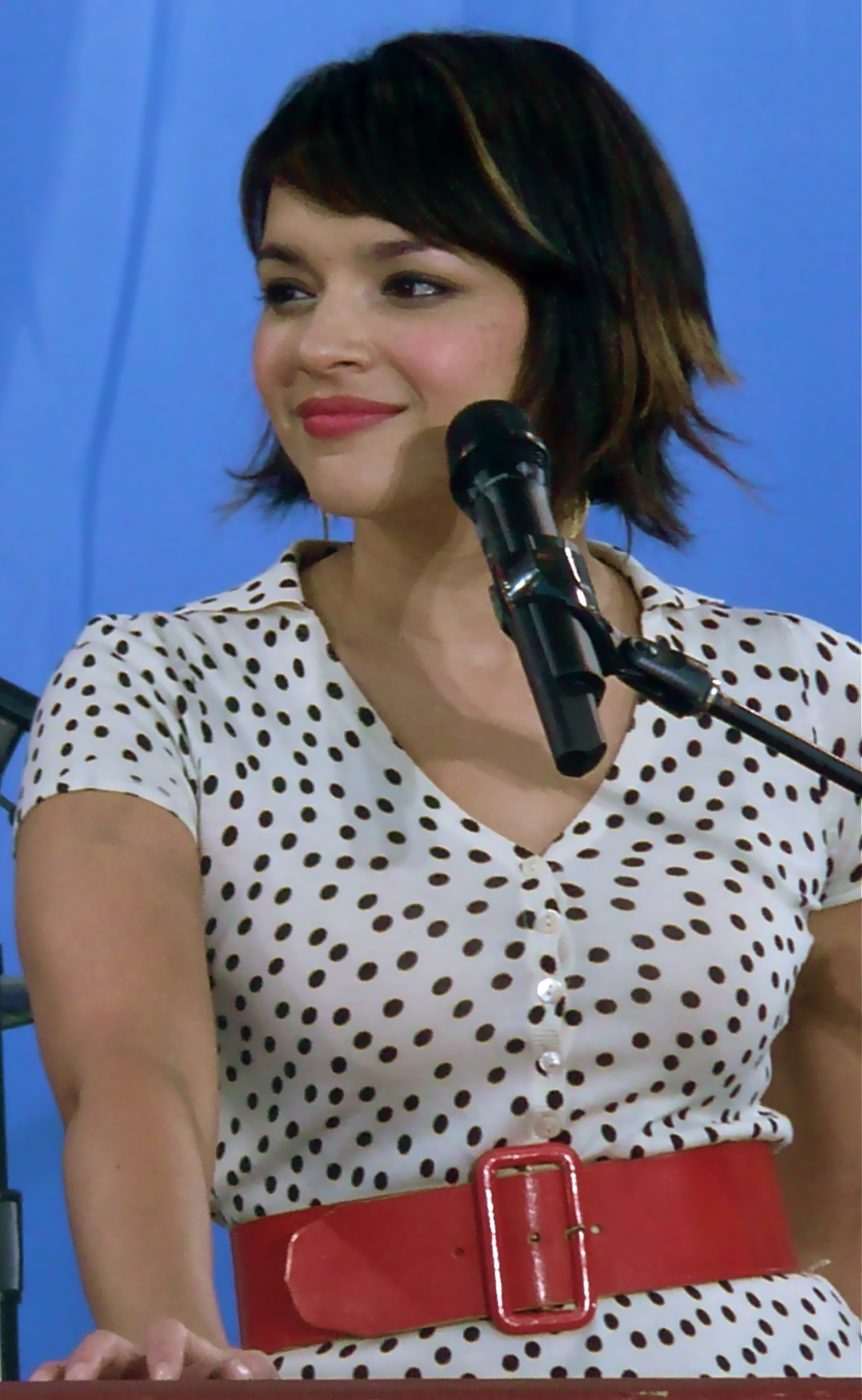
Norah Jones

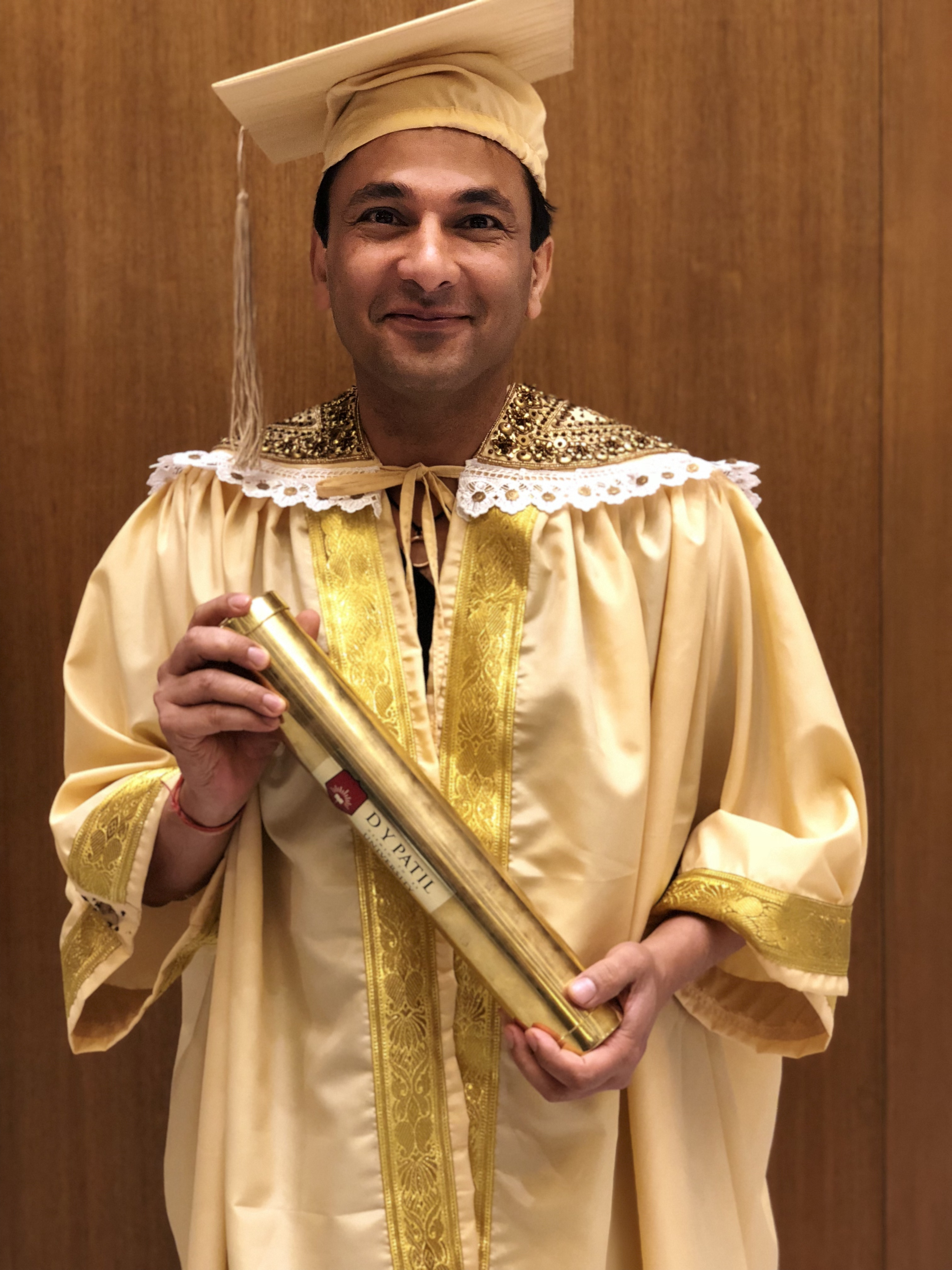
Vikas Khanna

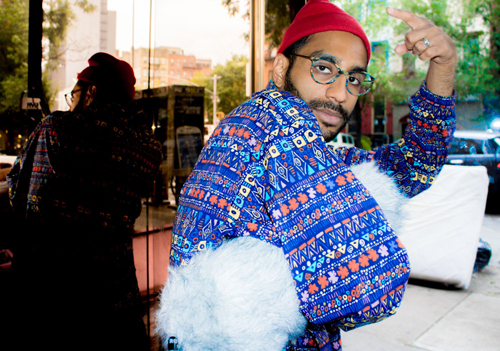
Ashok Kondabolu

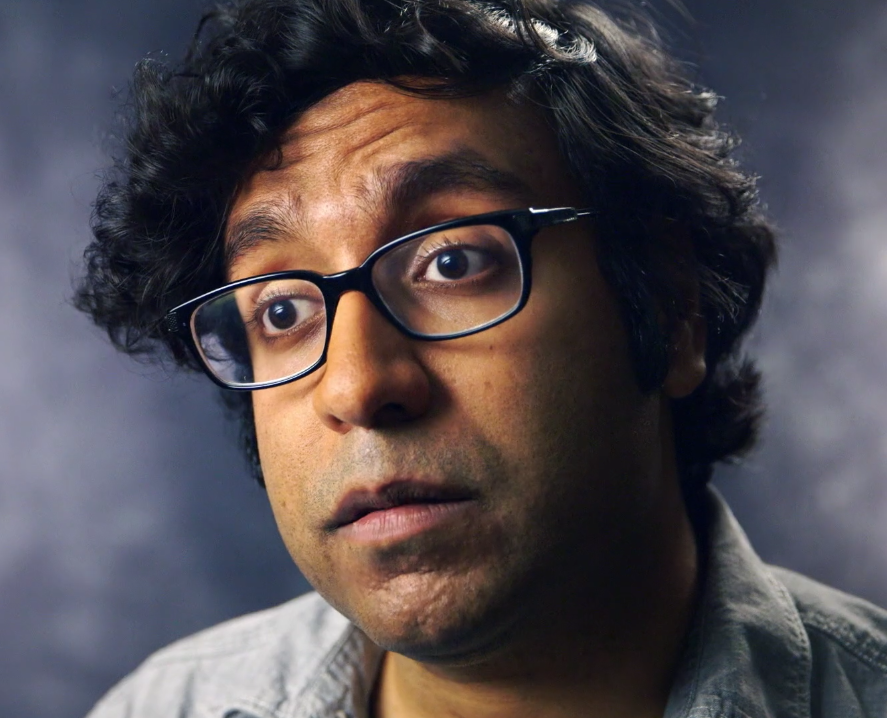
Hari Kondabolu

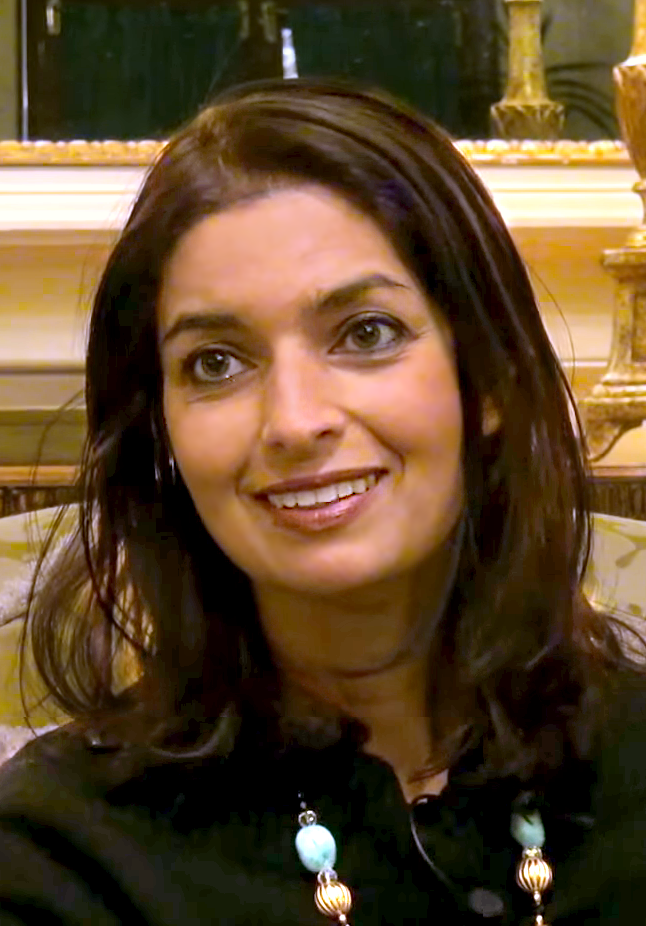
Jhumpa Lahiri

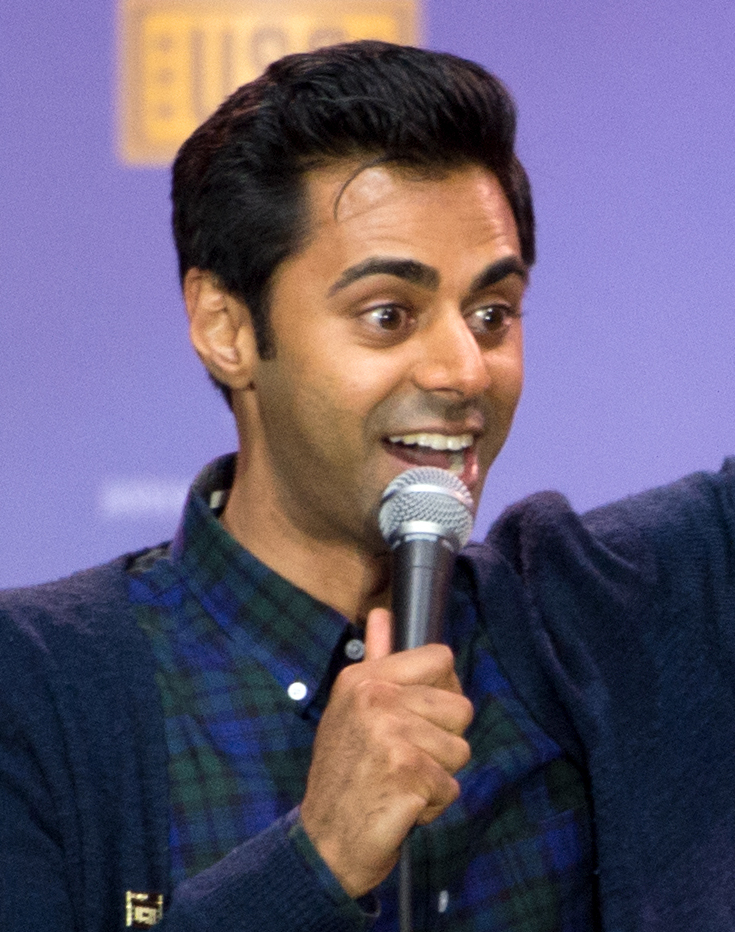
Hasan Minhaj

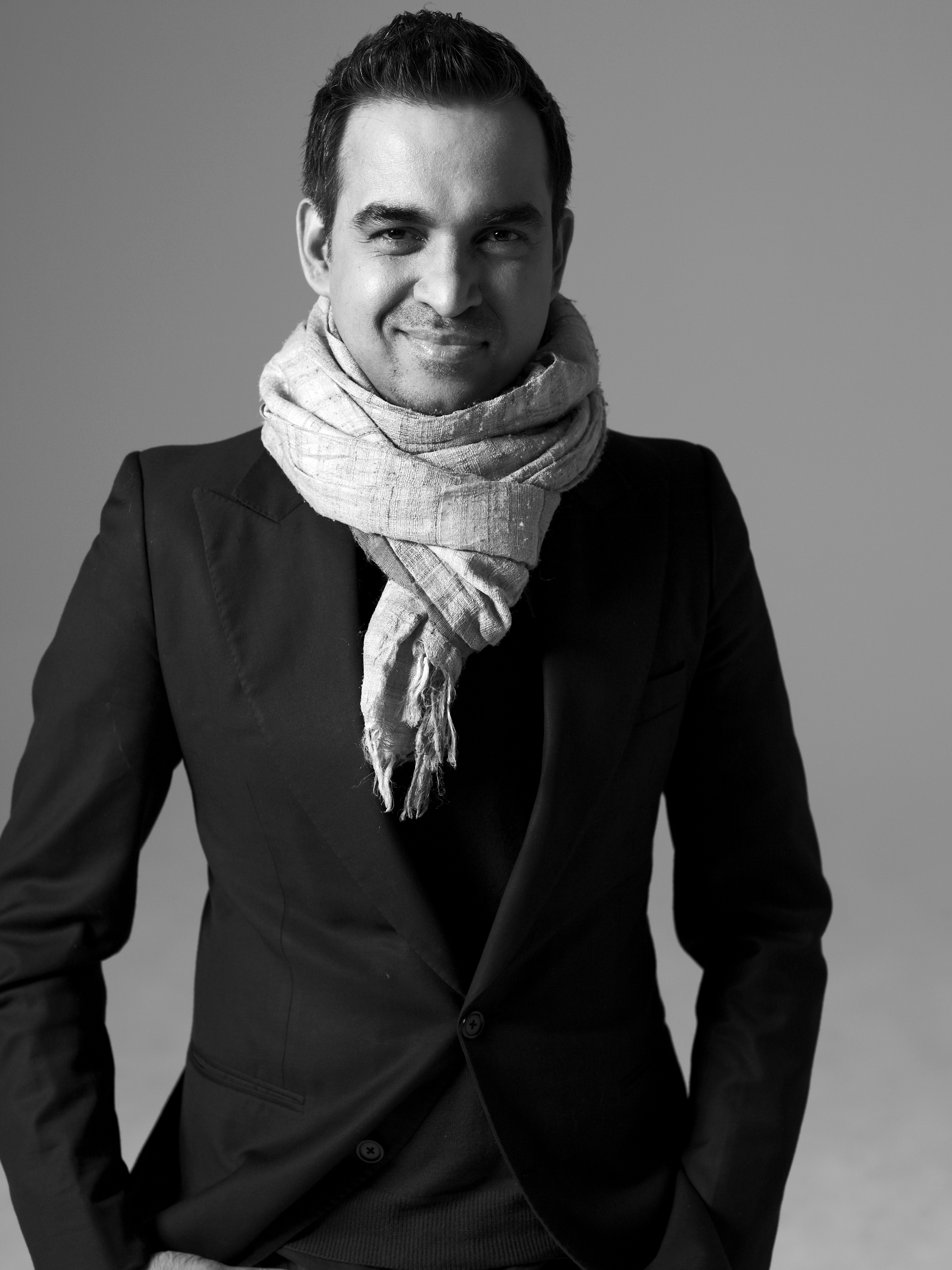
Bibhu Mohapatra

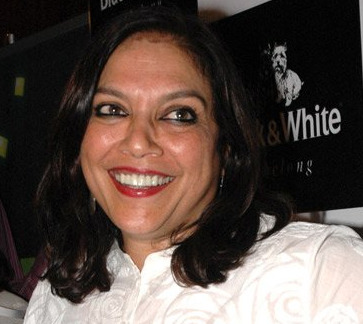
Mira Nair

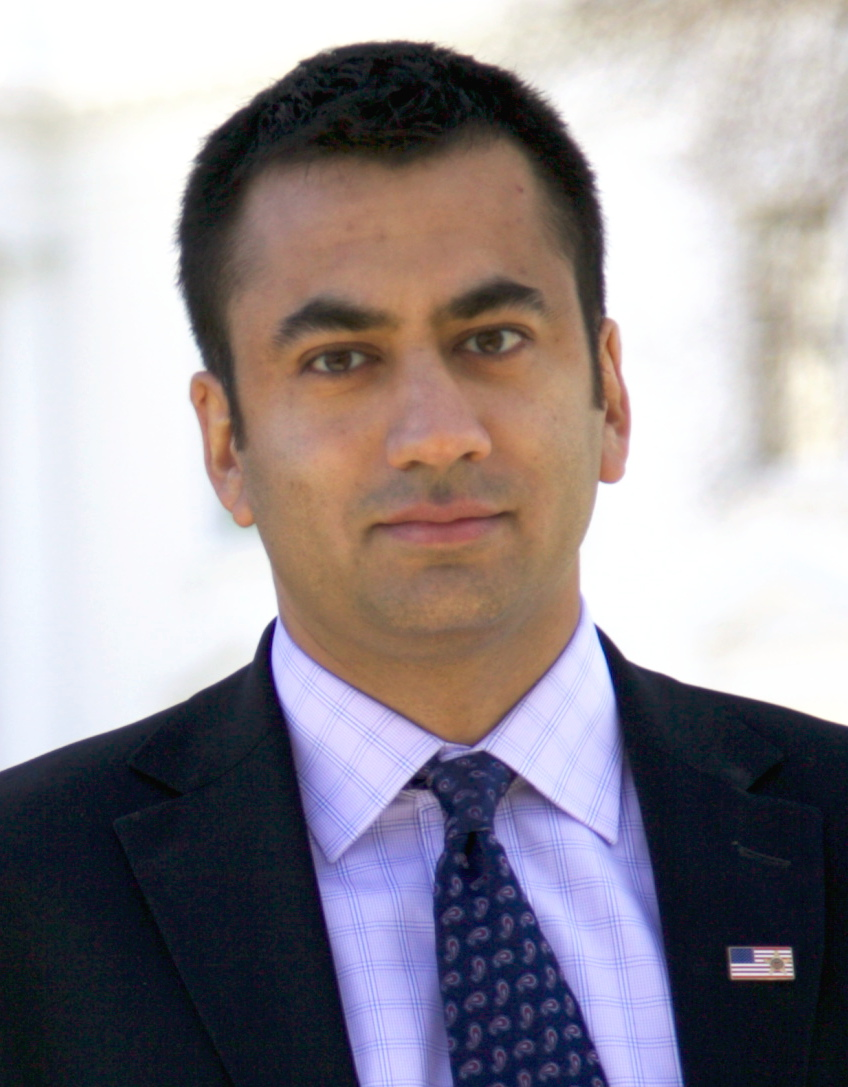
Kal Penn

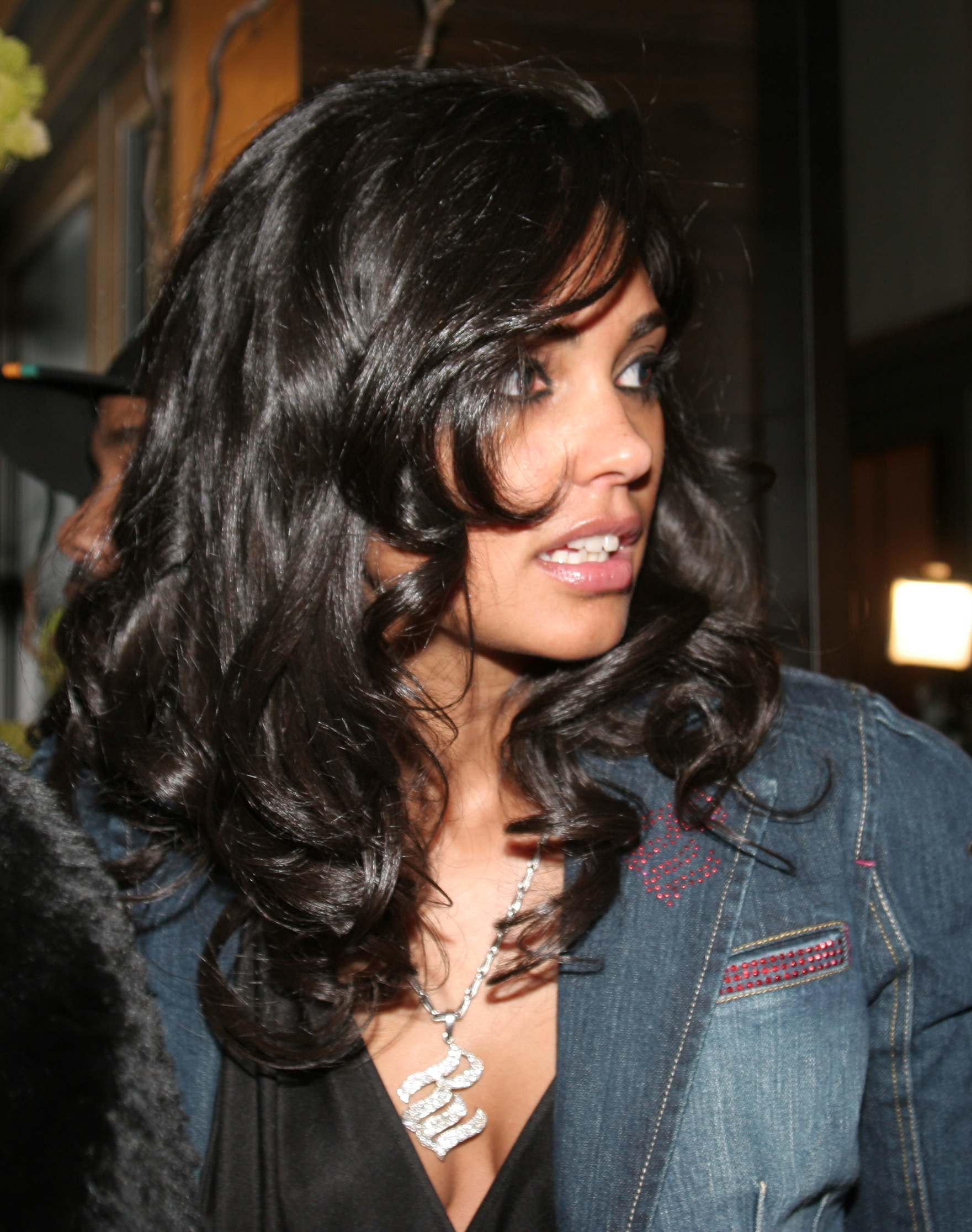
Rachel Roy

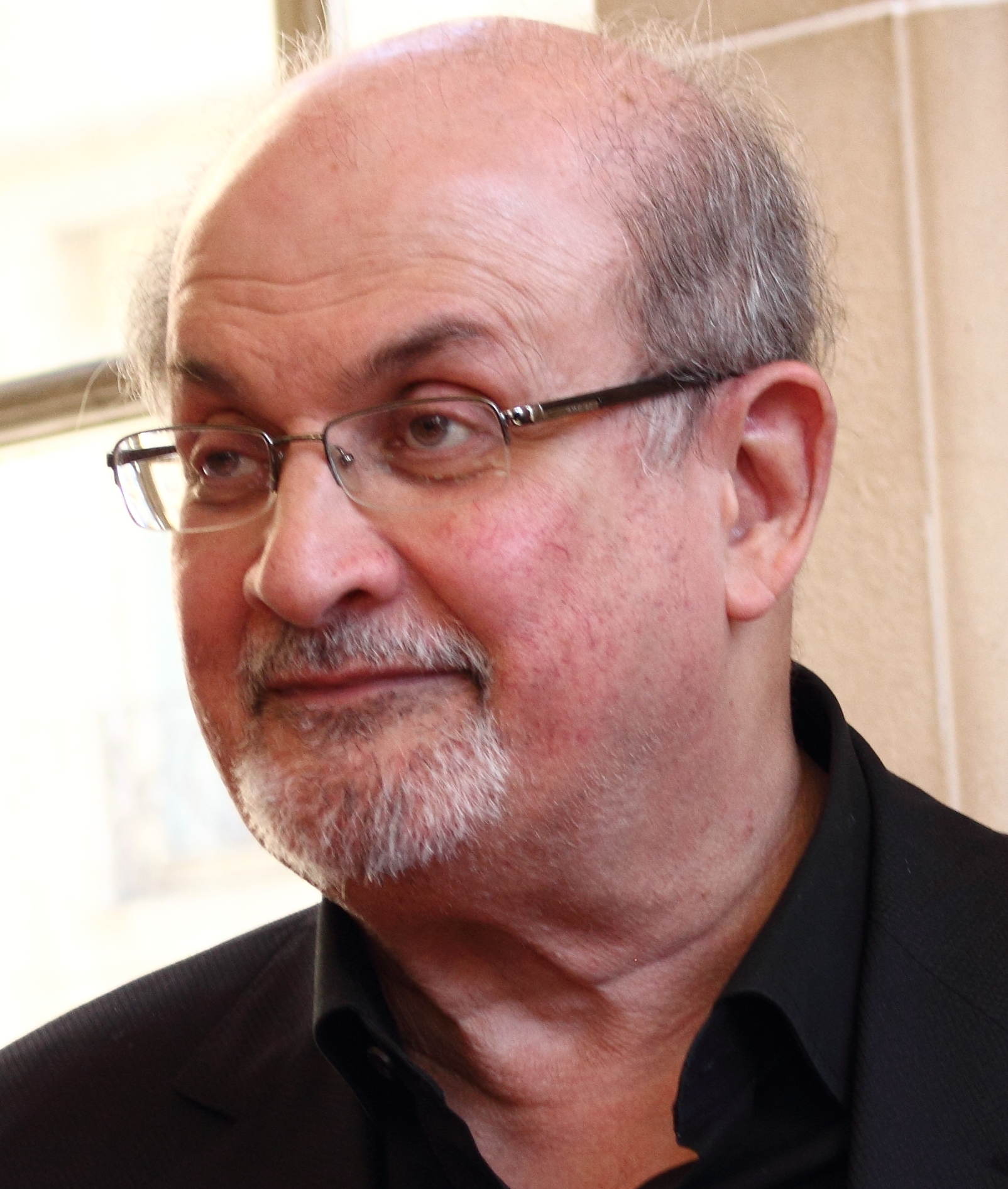
Salman Rushdie

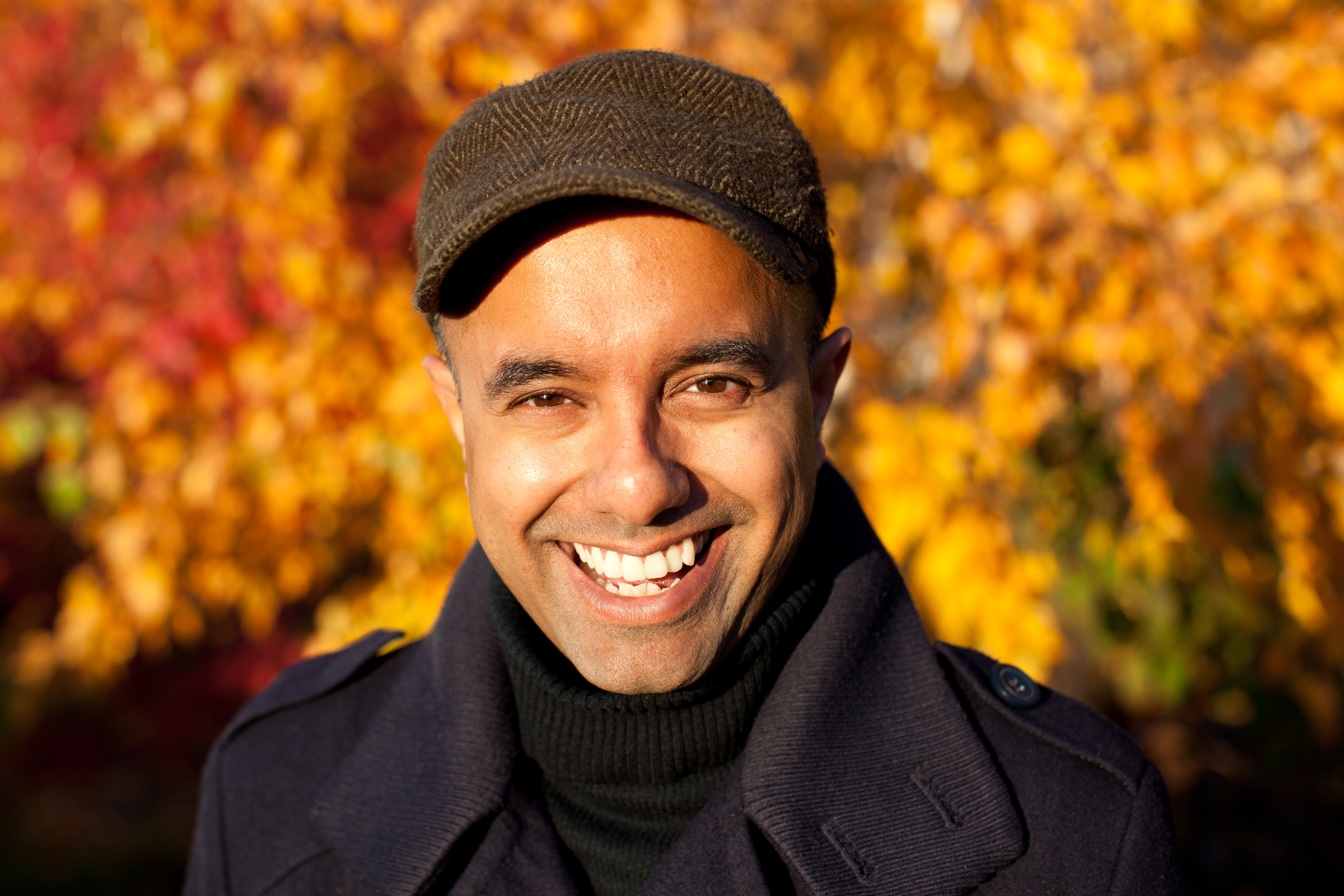
Rakesh Satyal

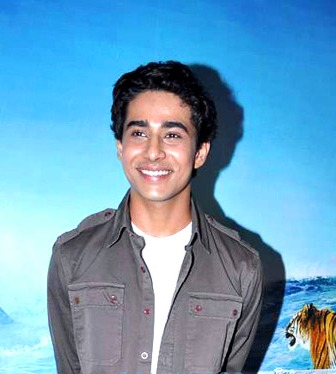
Suraj Sharma

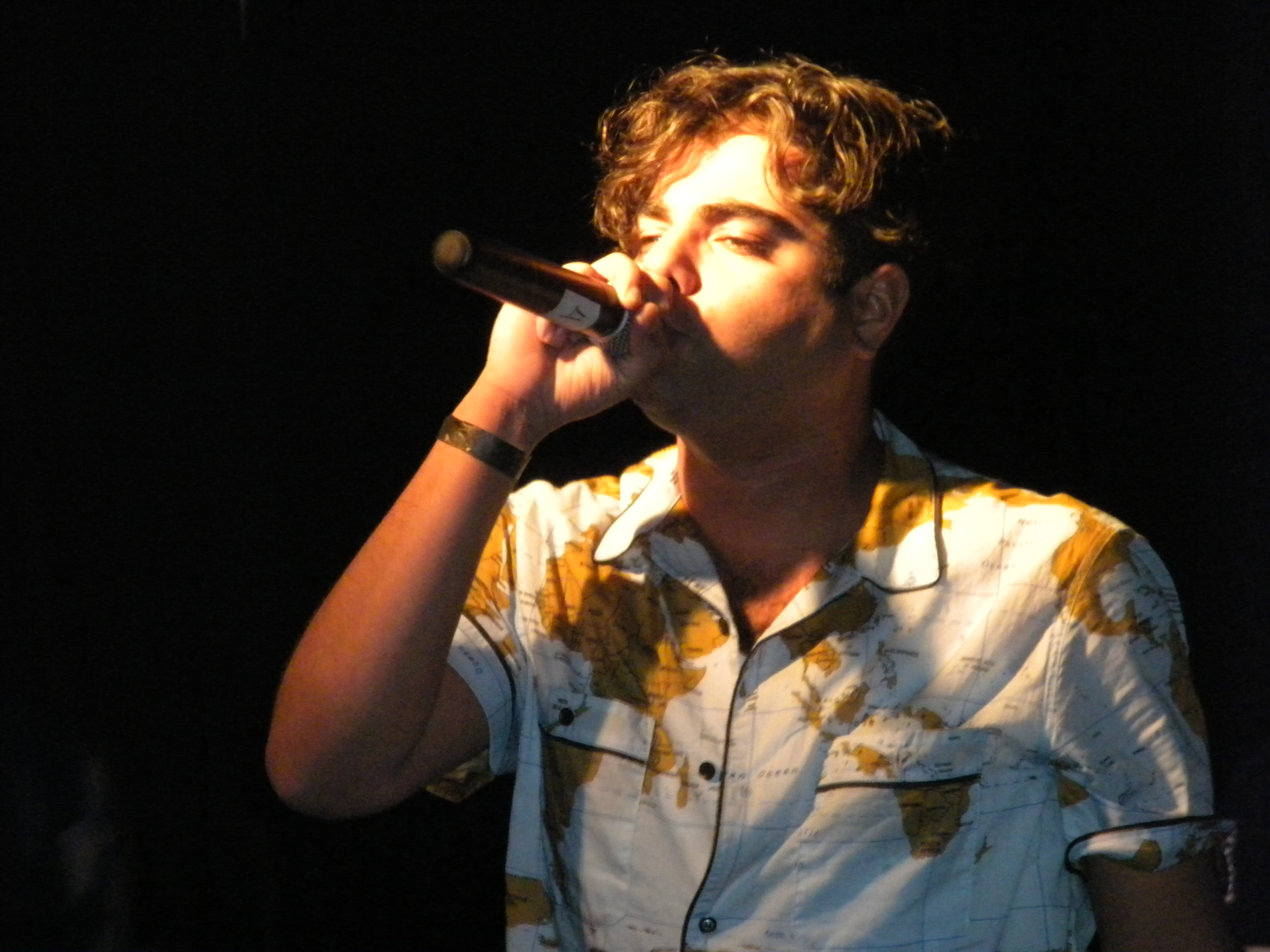
Himanshu Suri

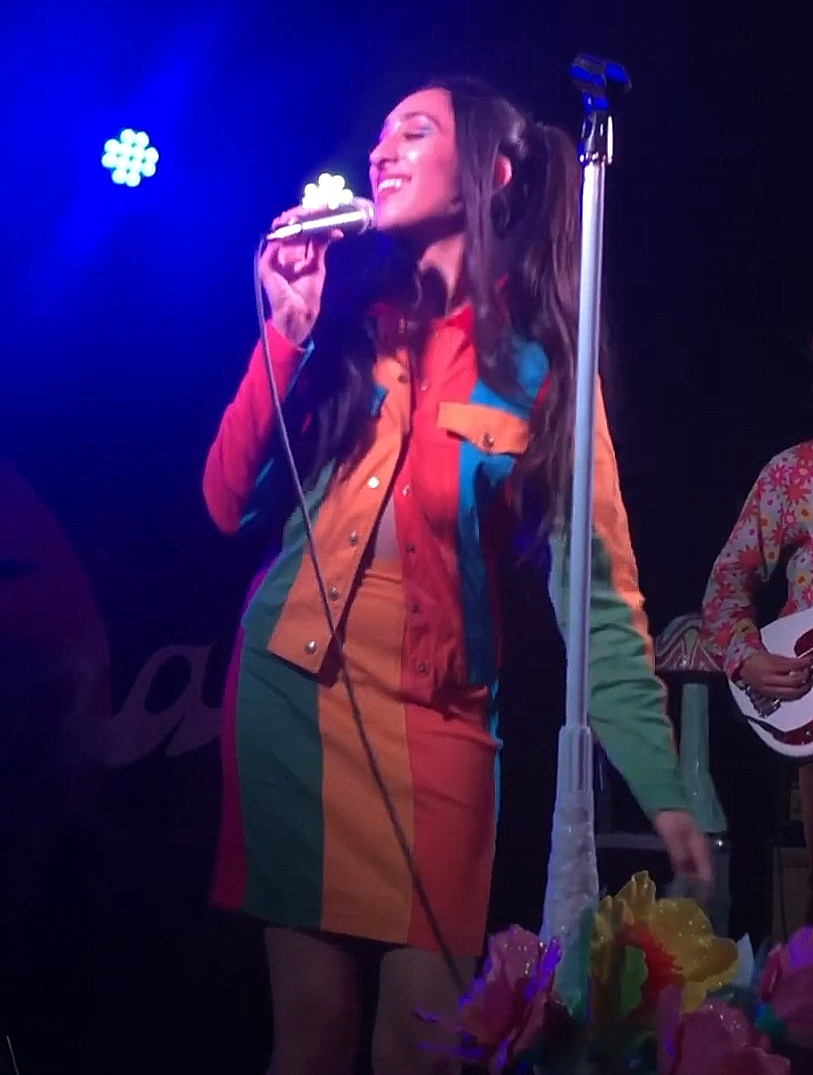
Raveena
Indian New Yorkers and New Jerseyans – Arts and culture
- Waris Ahluwalia – fashion designer, actor, and model
- Aziz Ansari – actor, comedian
- Devika Bhise - actor, producer
- Bala Devi Chandrashekar – Bharatanatyam dancer
- Sarita Choudhury – actress
- Nina Davuluri – Miss America 2014
- Sameer Gadhia – lead singer of alternative rock band Young the Giant
- Terry Gajraj – singer
- Rohit Gupta – filmmaker
- Poorna Jagannathan – actress and fashion model
- Sunny Jain – musician
- Norah Jones (Geetali Norah Jones Shankar) – singer-songwriter, musician, and actress
- Vikas Khanna – Michelin Star Chef, Restaurateur, author, Filmmaker and Humanitarian.
- Ashok Kondabolu – internet personality
- Hari Kondabolu – comedian
- Jhumpa Lahiri – author
- Utsav Lal – pianist, composer, and educator
- Arun Luthra – musician
- Mathai – singer-songwriter
- Hasan Minhaj – actor and comedian
- Bibhu Mohapatra – fashion designer
- Mira Nair – filmmaker
- Kal Penn – actor
- Raveena – singer-songwriter
- Rachel Roy – fashion designer
- Salman Rushdie – historical fiction novelist
- Rakesh Satyal – novelist
- Suraj Sharma – actor
- Himanshu Suri – rapper

=== Business ===
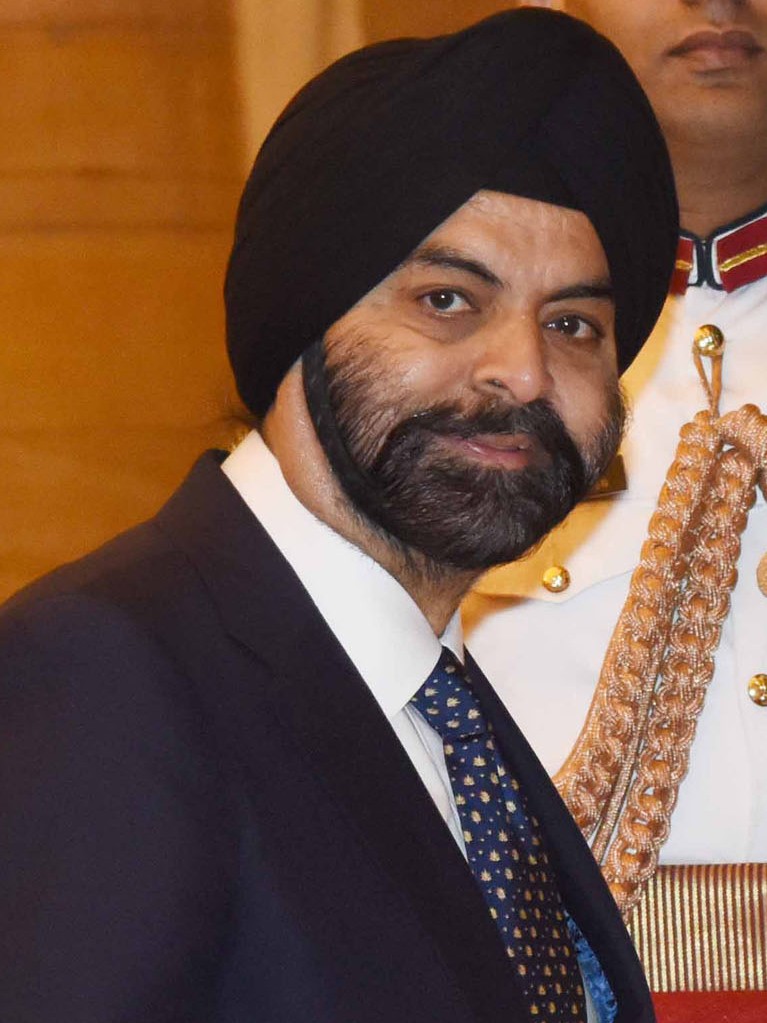
Ajaypal Singh Banga

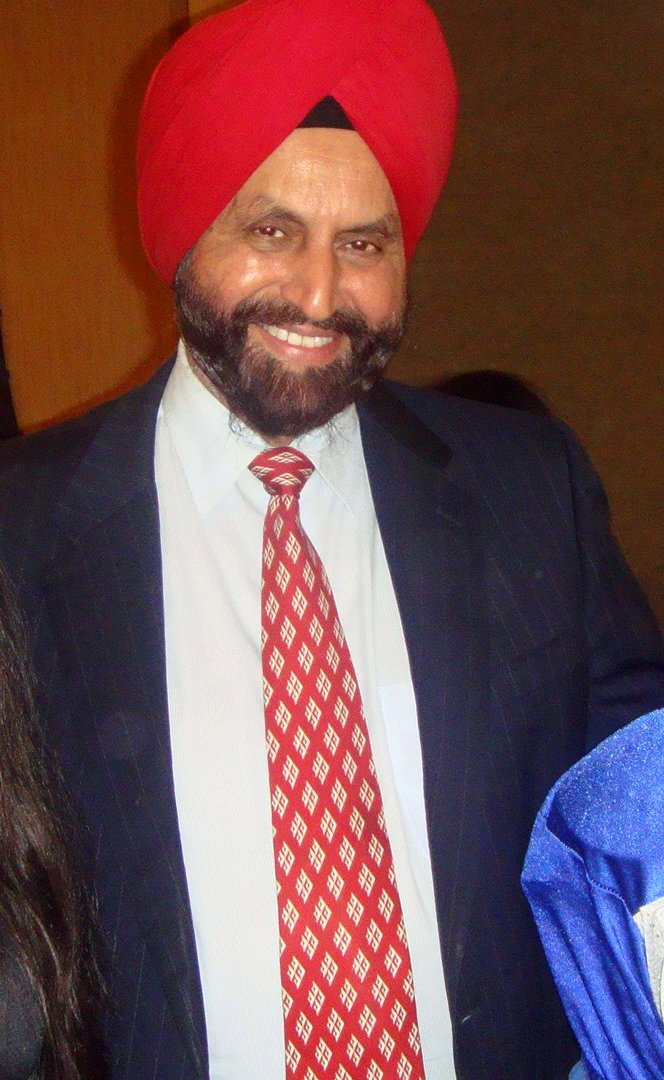
Sant Singh Chatwal

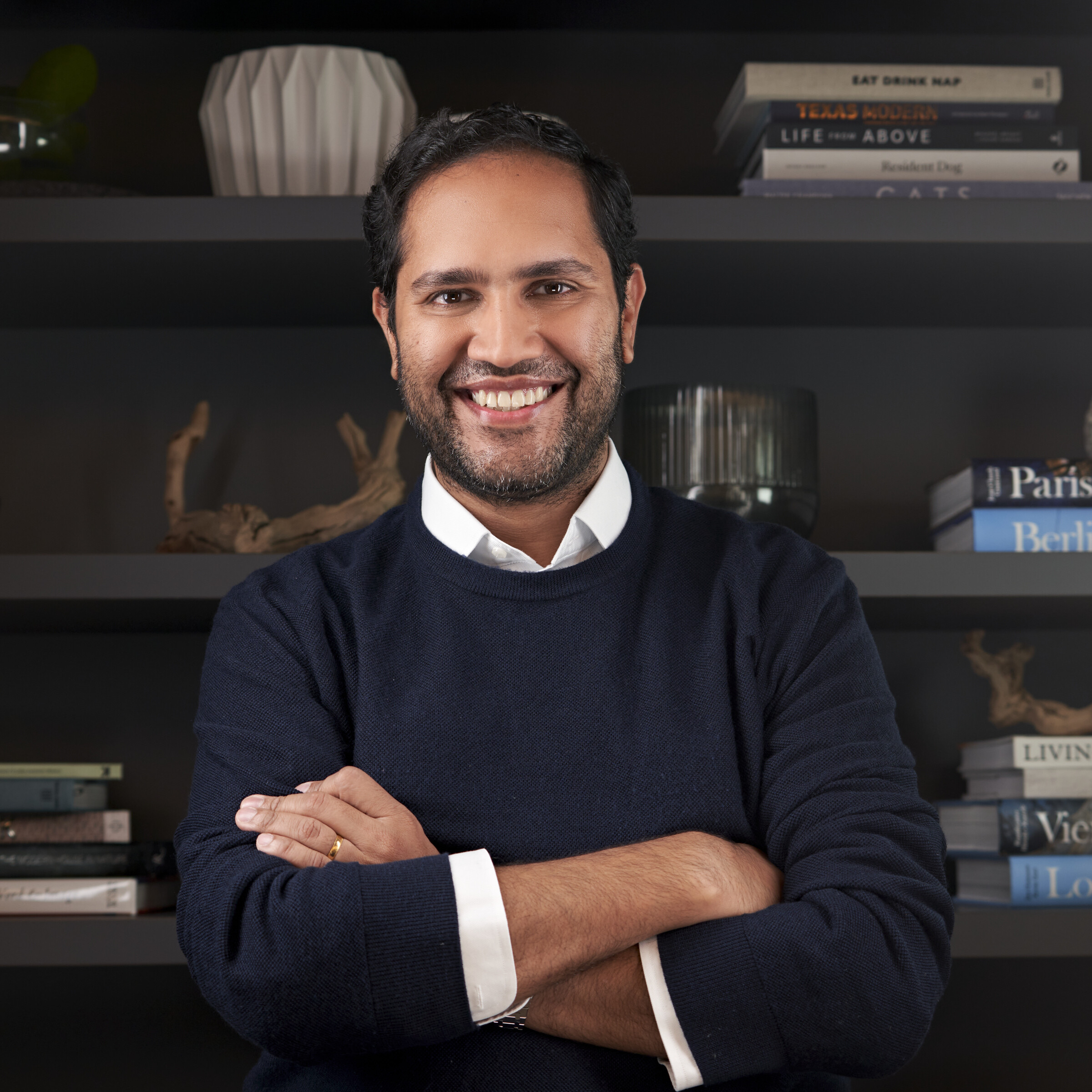
Vishal Garg

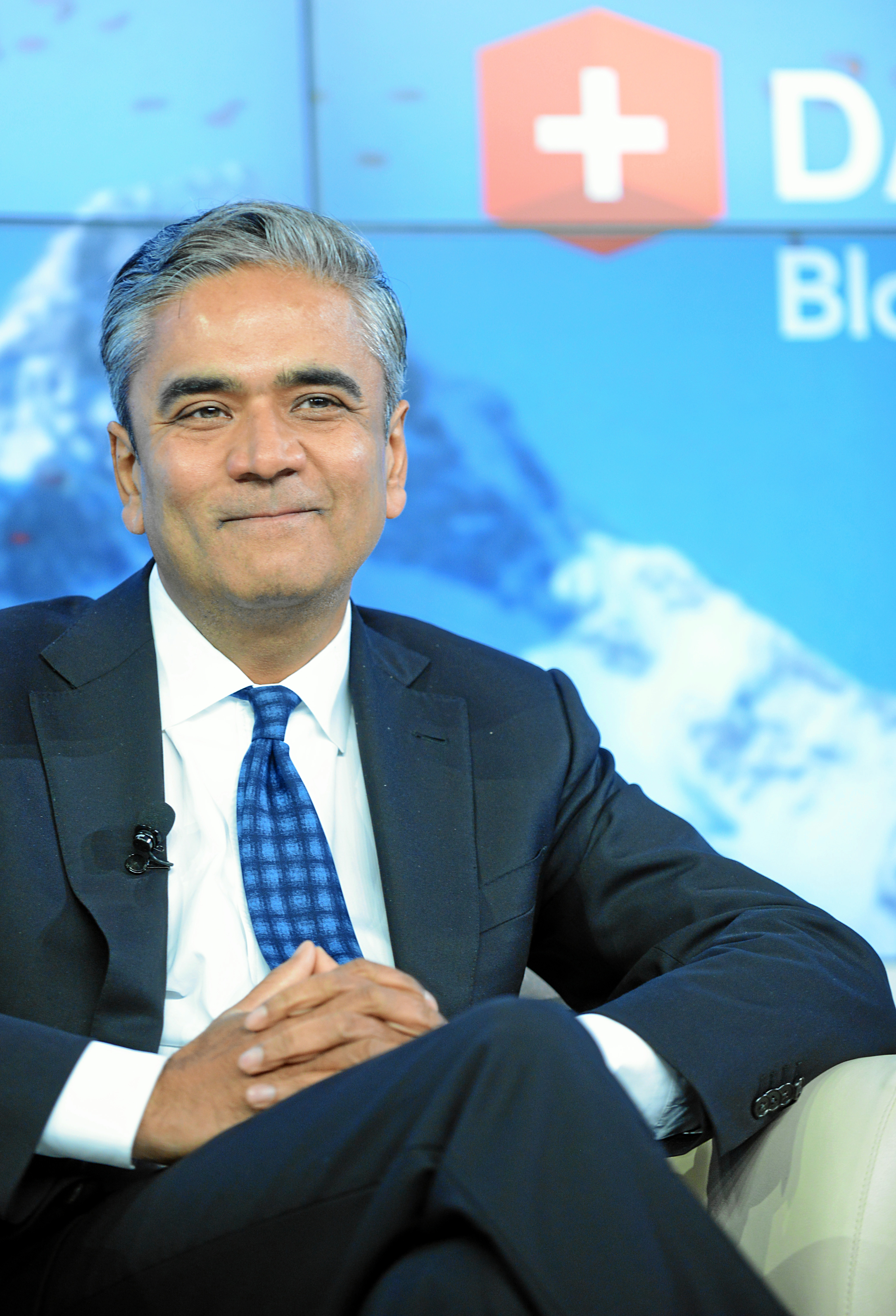
Anshu Jain

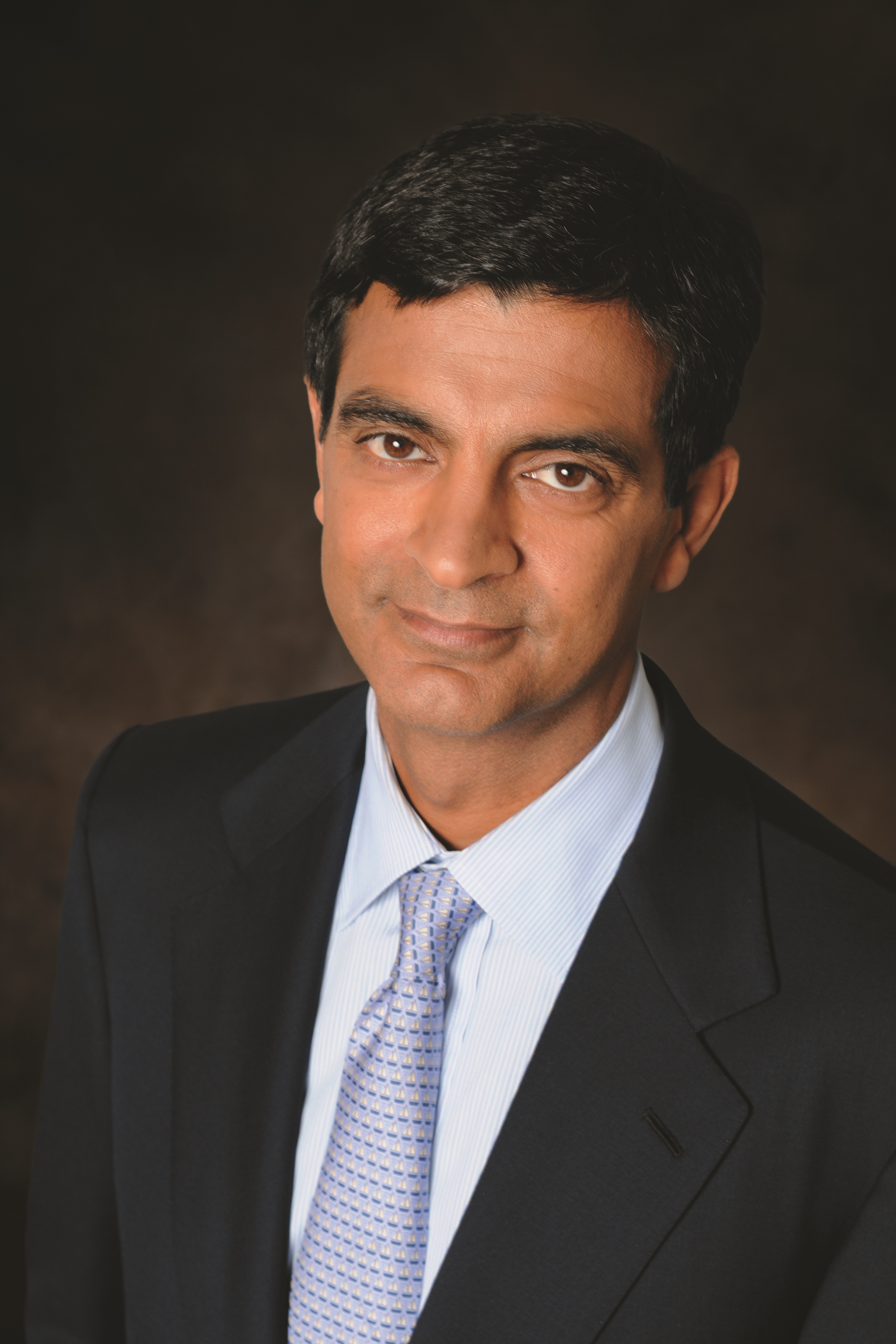
Sandeep Mathrani

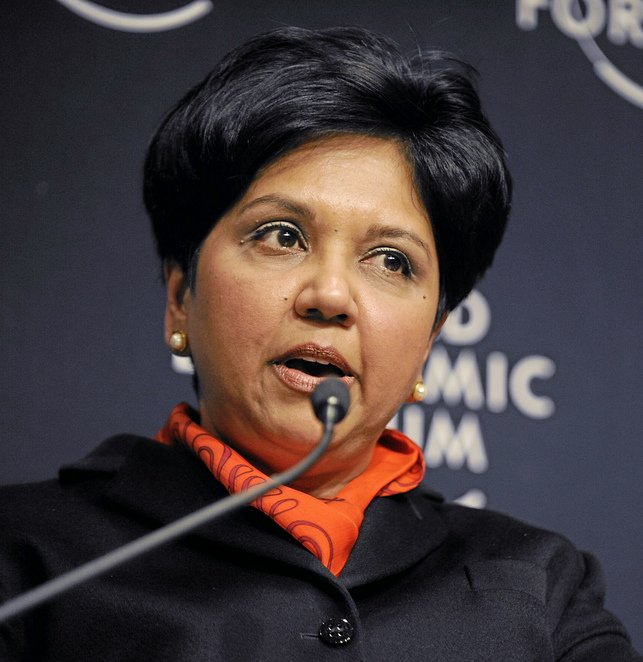
Indra Nooyi

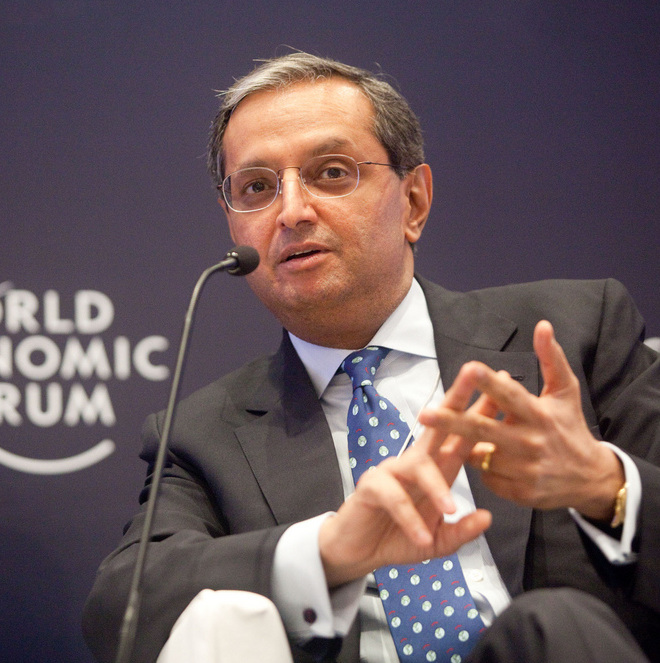
Vikram Pandit

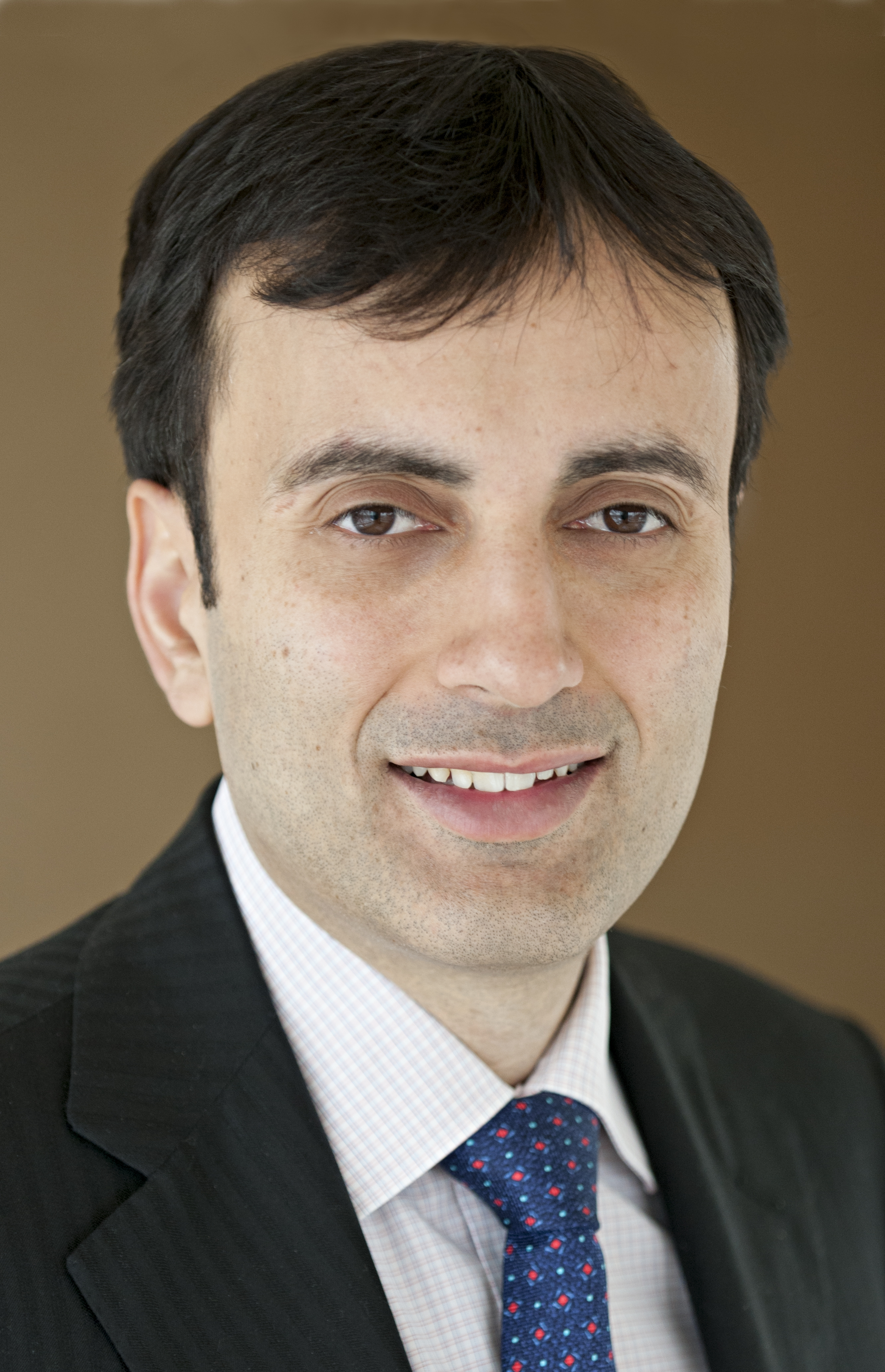
Ruchir Sharma
Indian New Yorkers and New Jerseyans – Business
- Anu Aiyengar – global co-head of North American mergers and acquisitions at JPMorgan Chase & Co
- Ajaypal Singh Banga – CEO, MasterCard
- Sant Singh Chatwal – founder of numerous hotel brands including The Chatwal, Dream Hotels, and Time Hotels.
- Vishal Garg – CEO, Better.com
- Ajit Jain – president, Berkshire Hathaway Reinsurance Group
- Anshu Jain – president at Cantor Fitzgerald
- Arvind Krishna – CEO, IBM
- Sandeep Mathrani – CEO, WeWork
- Laxman Narasimhan – former CEO of Starbucks Corporation
- Indra Nooyi – former CEO of PepsiCo
- Vikram Pandit – former CEO of Citigroup
- Ruchir Sharma – economist, chief global strategist of asset management and emerging markets equity, Morgan Stanley Investment Management

=== Education ===
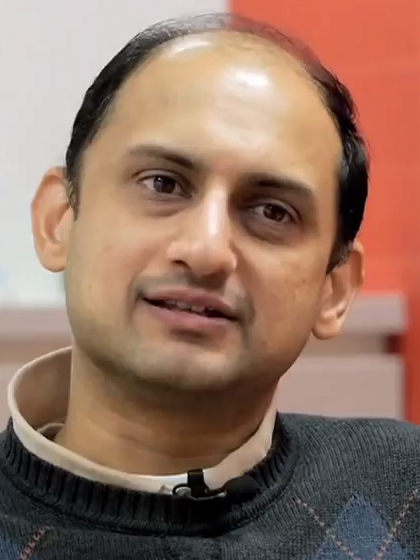
Viral Acharya

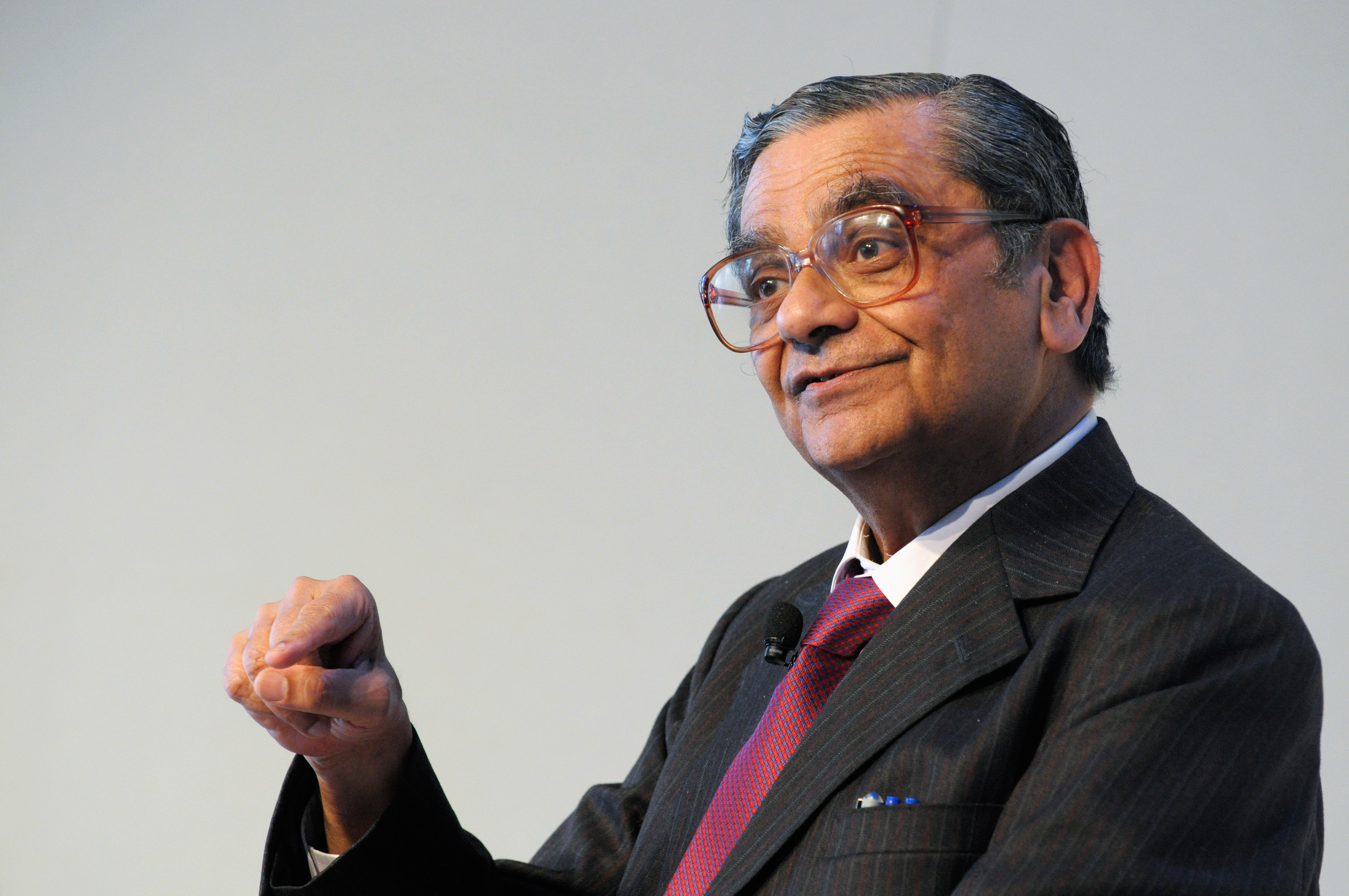
Jagdish Bhagwati

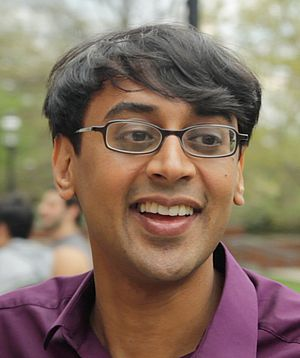
Manjul Bhargava

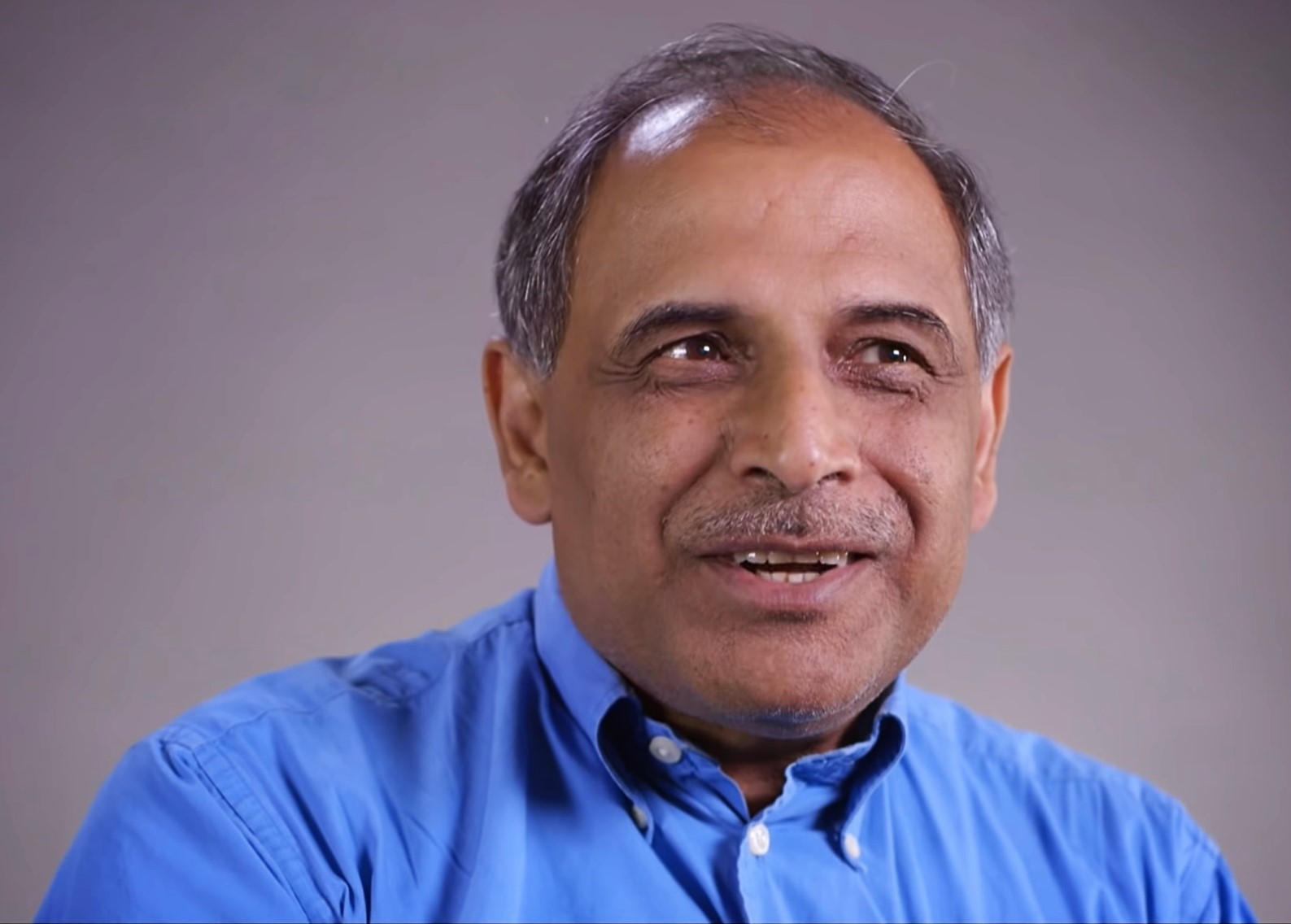
Upmanu Lall

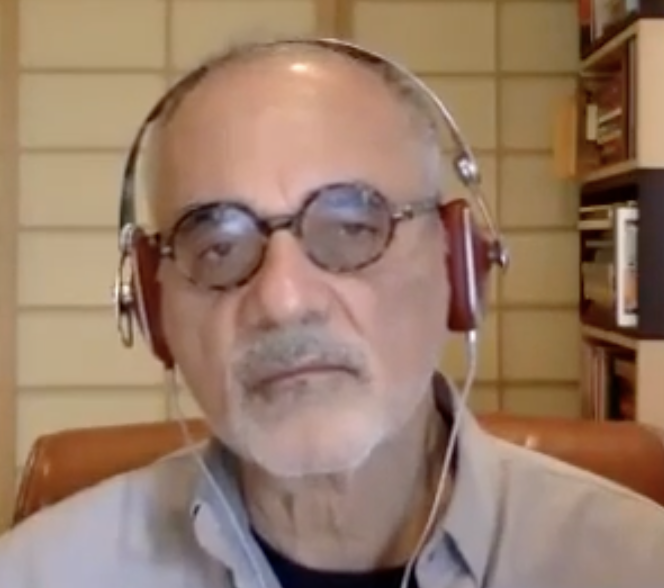
Mahmood Mamdani

Geeta Menon

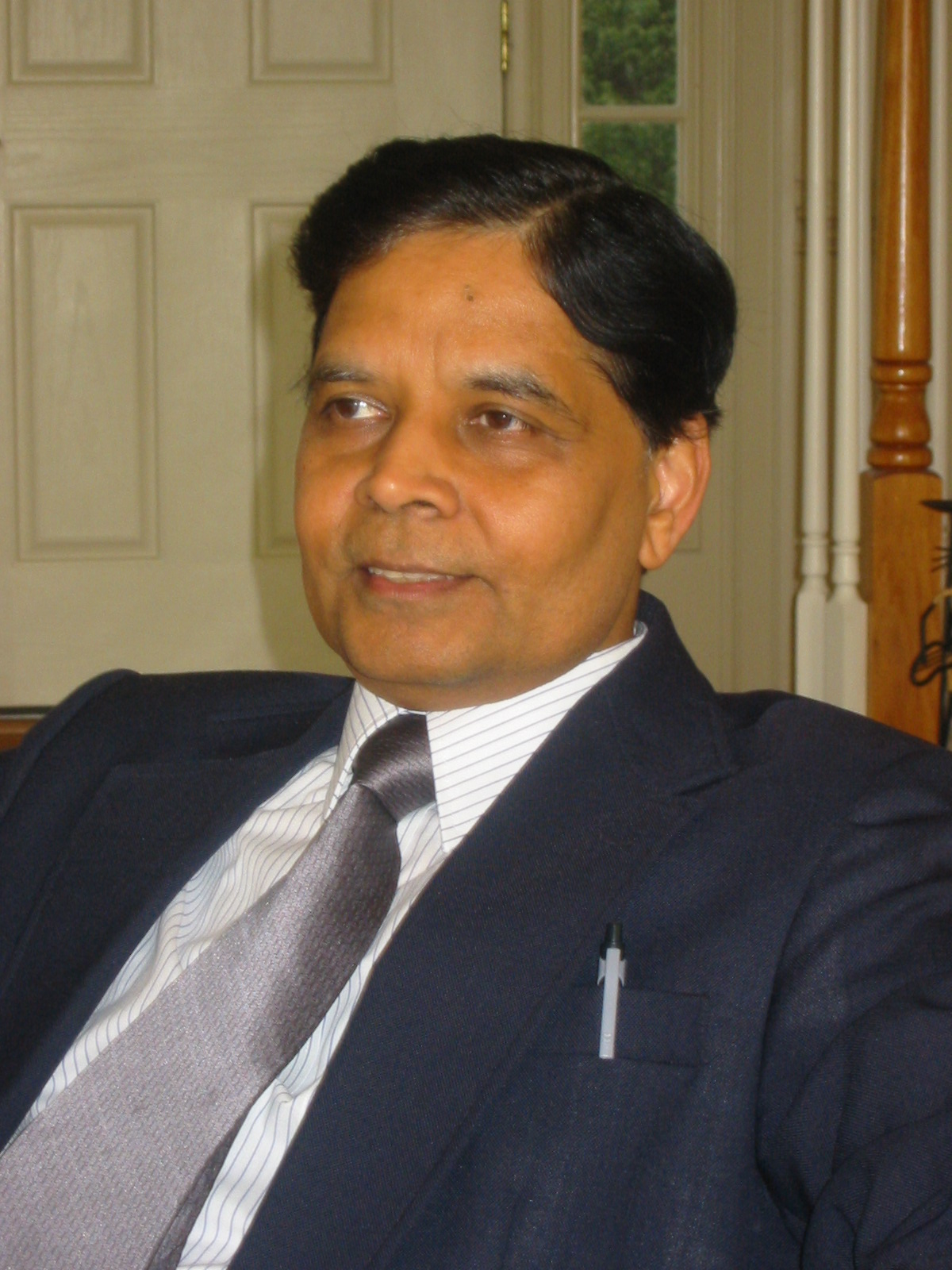
Arvind Panagariya

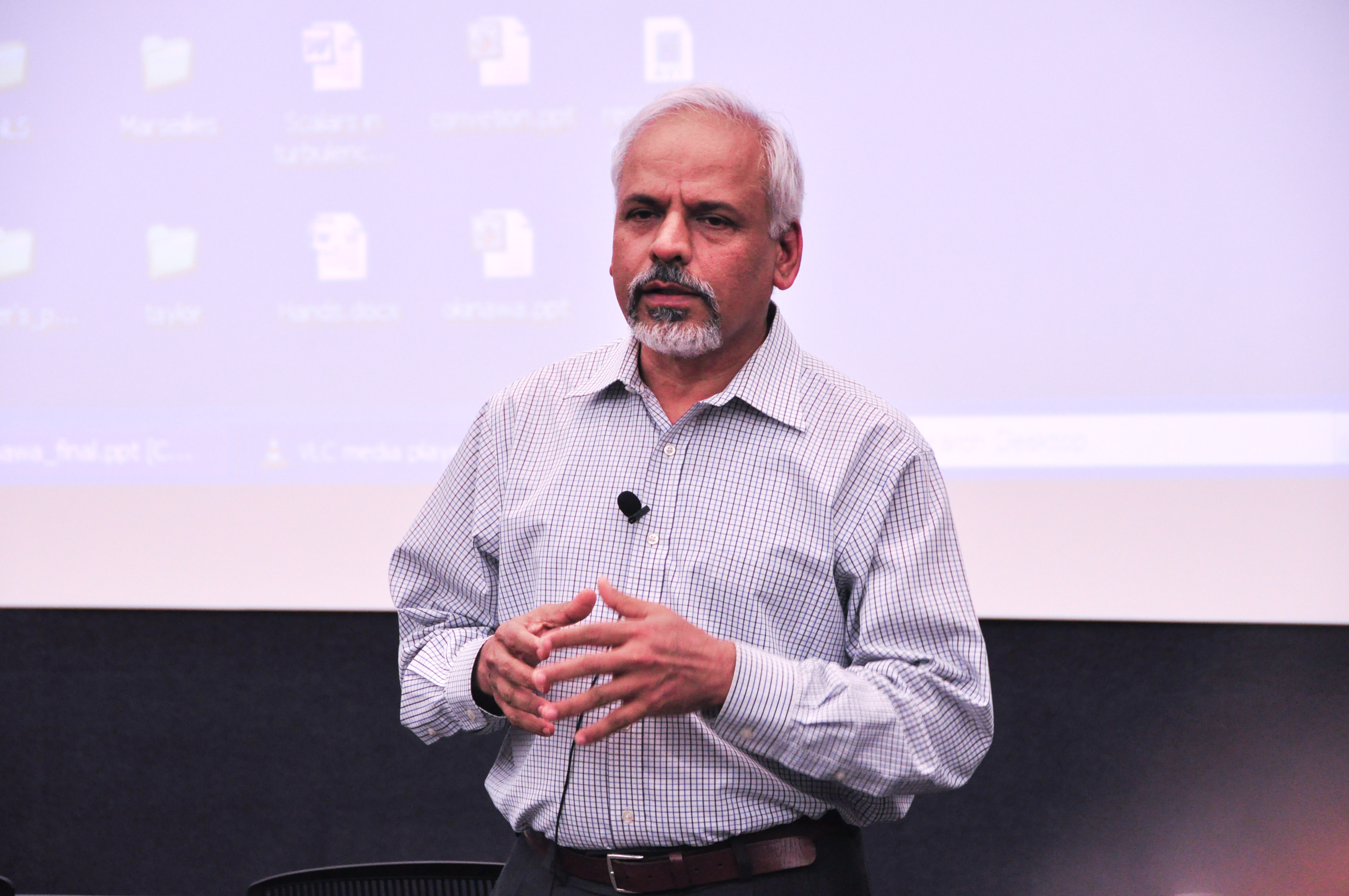
Katepalli Sreenivasan
Indian New Yorkers and New Jerseyans – Education
- Viral Acharya – professor of finance, New York University Stern School of Business
- Jagdish Bhagwati – Columbia University Law School
- Manjul Bhargava – professor of mathematics, Princeton University
- Upmanu Lall – professor, Fu Foundation School of Engineering, Columbia University
- Mahmood Mamdani – professor of political science, Columbia University
- Geeta Menon – professor and previously Dean Emeritus at New York University Stern School of Business
- Arvind Panagariya – professor, Columbia University, School of International and Public Affairs
- Katepalli Sreenivasan – academic dean of New York University Tandon School of Engineering
- Raghu Sundaram – Dean of New York University Stern School of Business

=== Entrepreneurship and technology ===
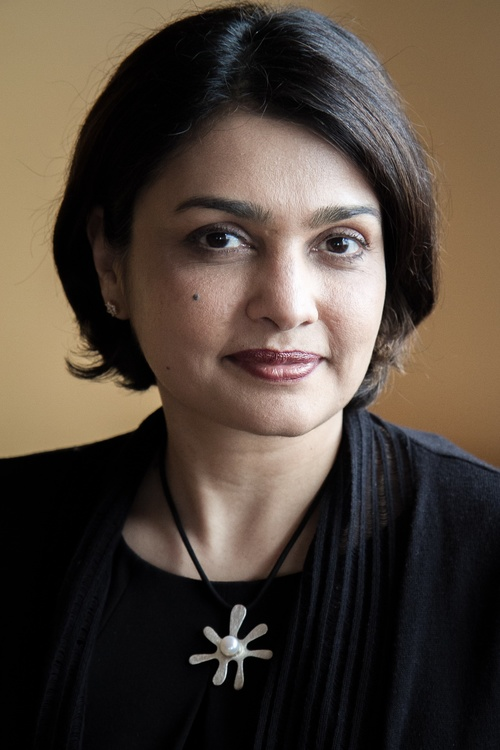
Roopa Unnikrishnan
Indian New Yorkers and New Jerseyans – Entrepreneurship and technology
- Dhairya Dand – inventor, artist, and designer
- Roopa Unnikrishnan – innovation consultant

=== Health ===
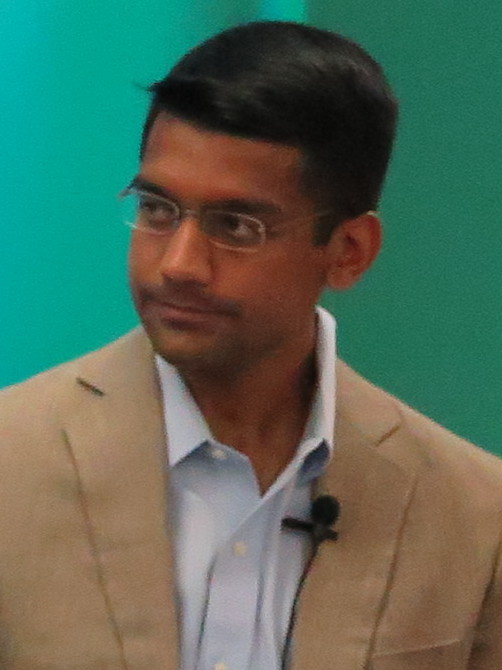
Dave Chokshi

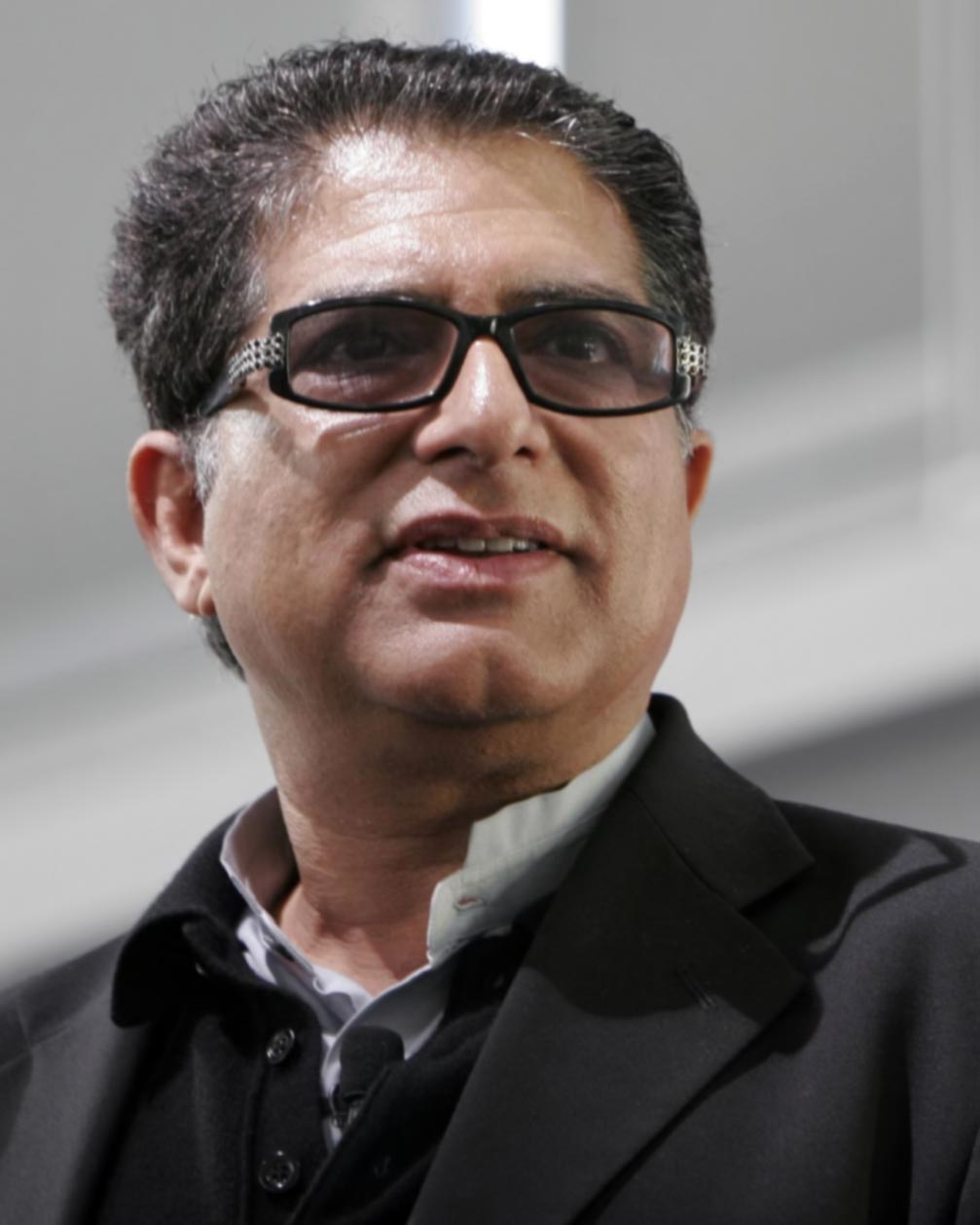
Deepak Chopra

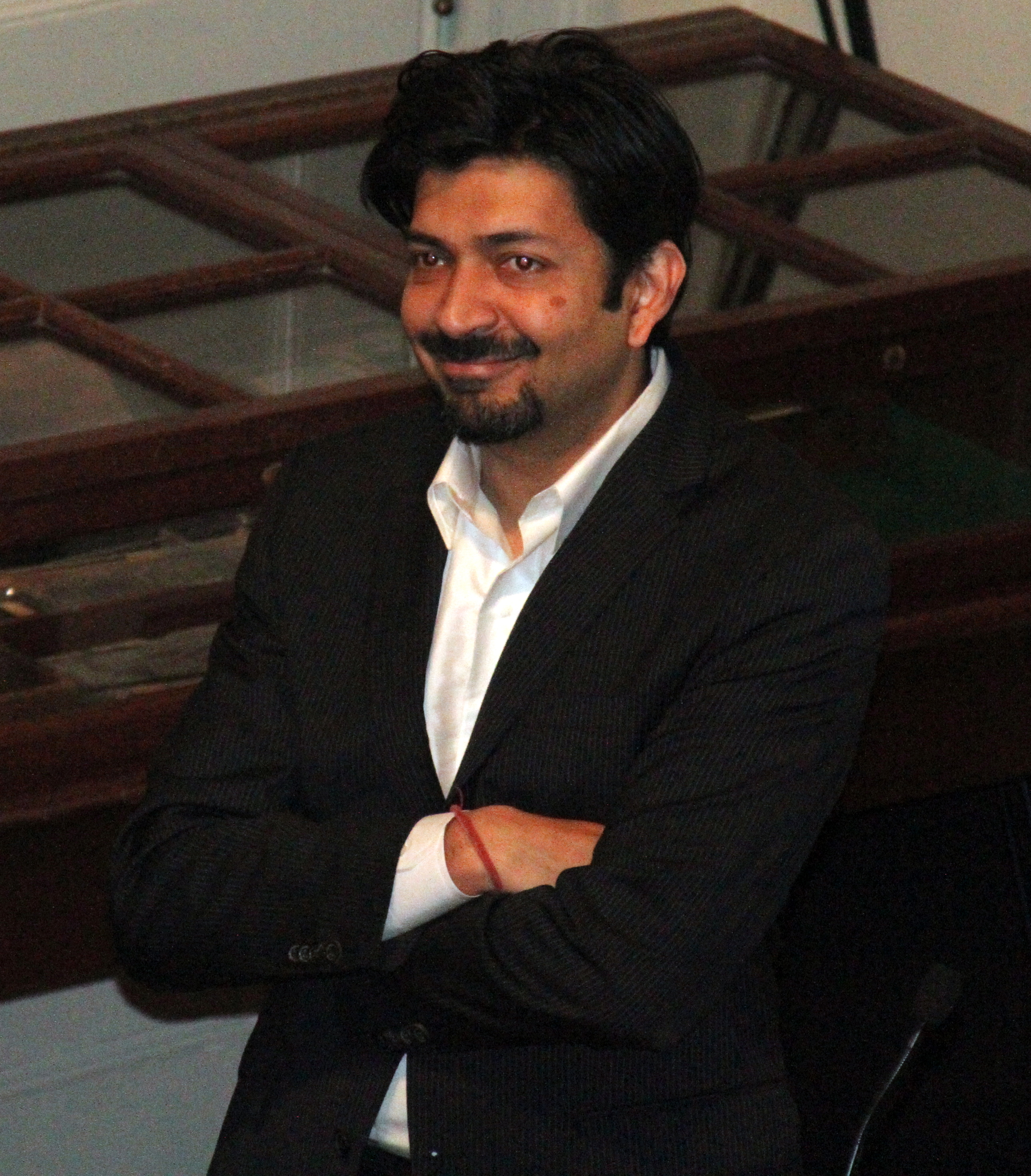
Siddhartha Mukherjee
Indian New Yorkers and New Jerseyans – Health
- Dave Chokshi, former Commissioner of Health of the City of New York
- Deepak Chopra – physician, alternative medicine advocate, public speaker, and author
- Siddhartha Mukherjee – hematologist and oncologist, scientist, and Pulitzer Prize winner for General Nonfiction
- Ashwin Vasan – Commissioner of Health of the City of New York

=== Law, politics, and diplomacy ===
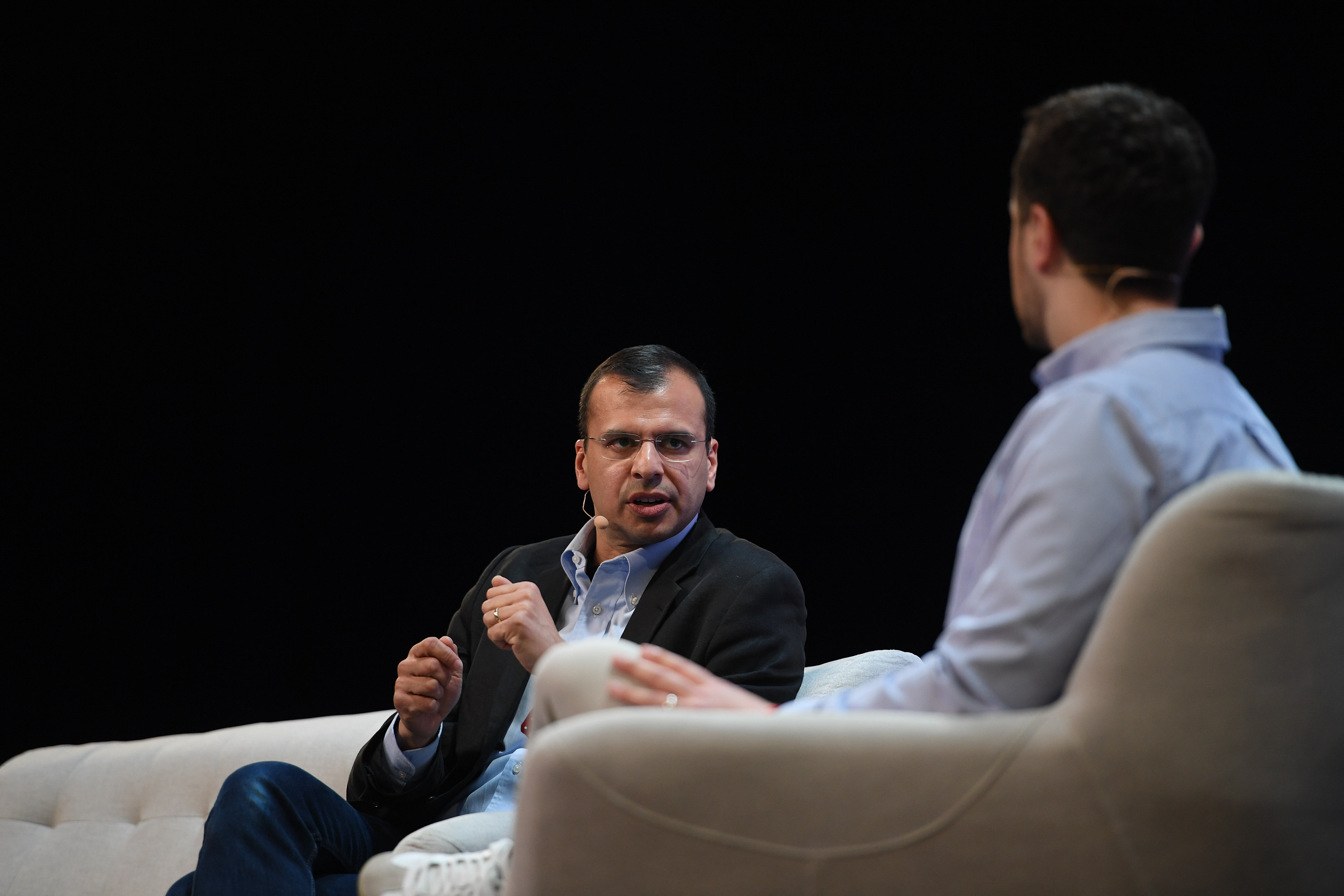
Rohit Aggarwala

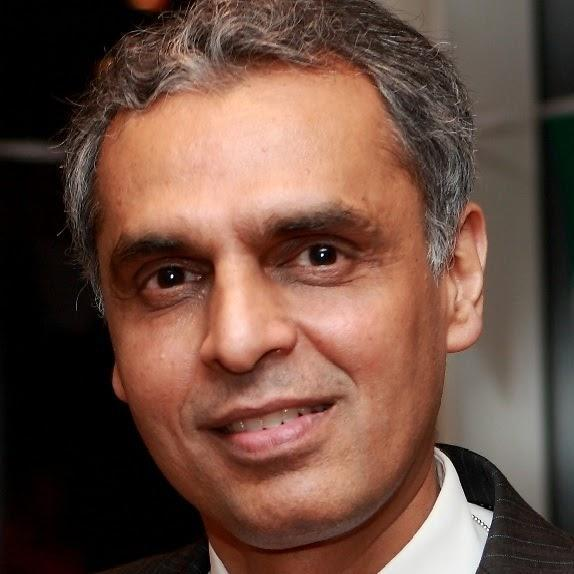
Syed Akbaruddin

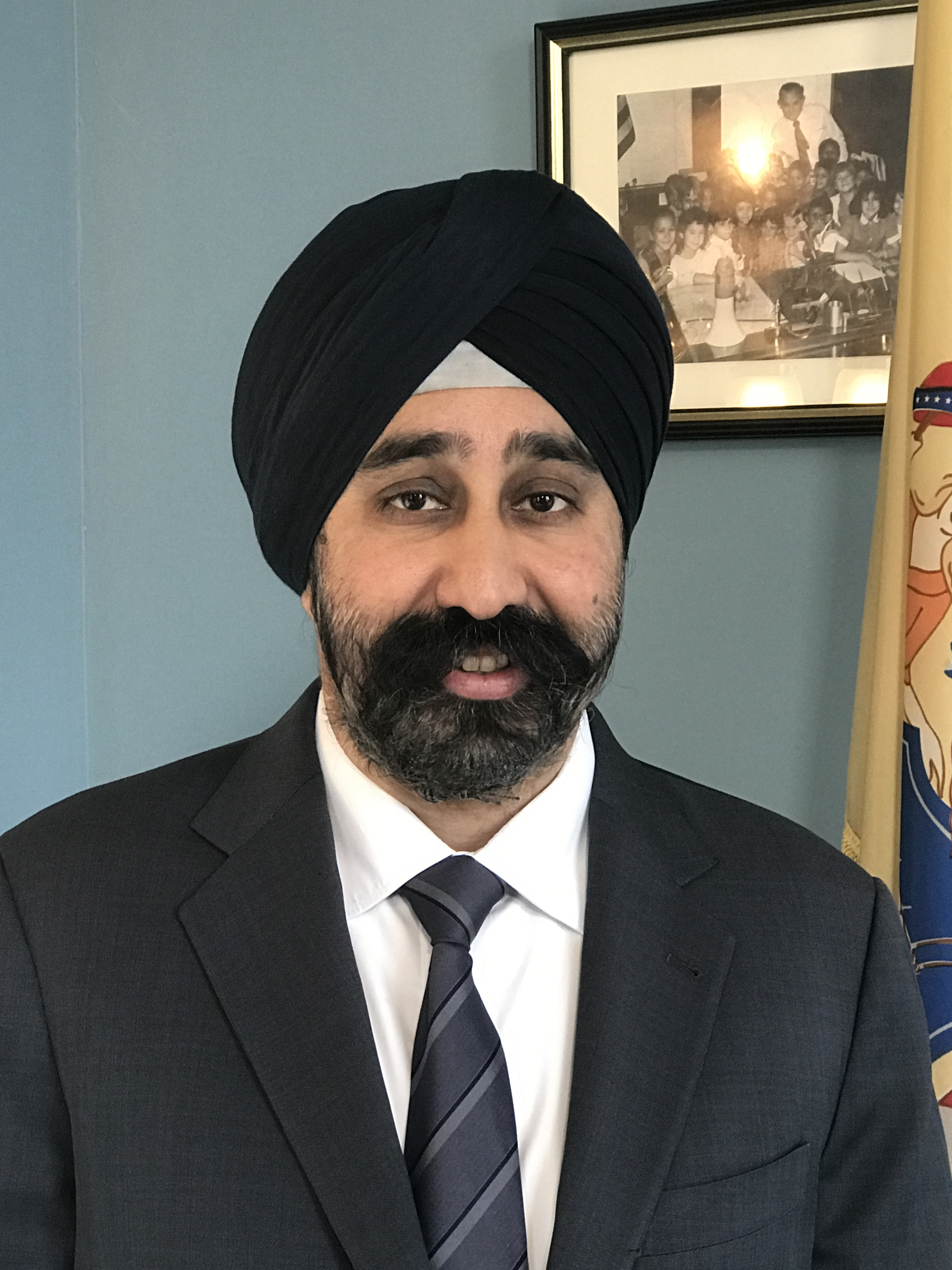
Ravinder Bhalla

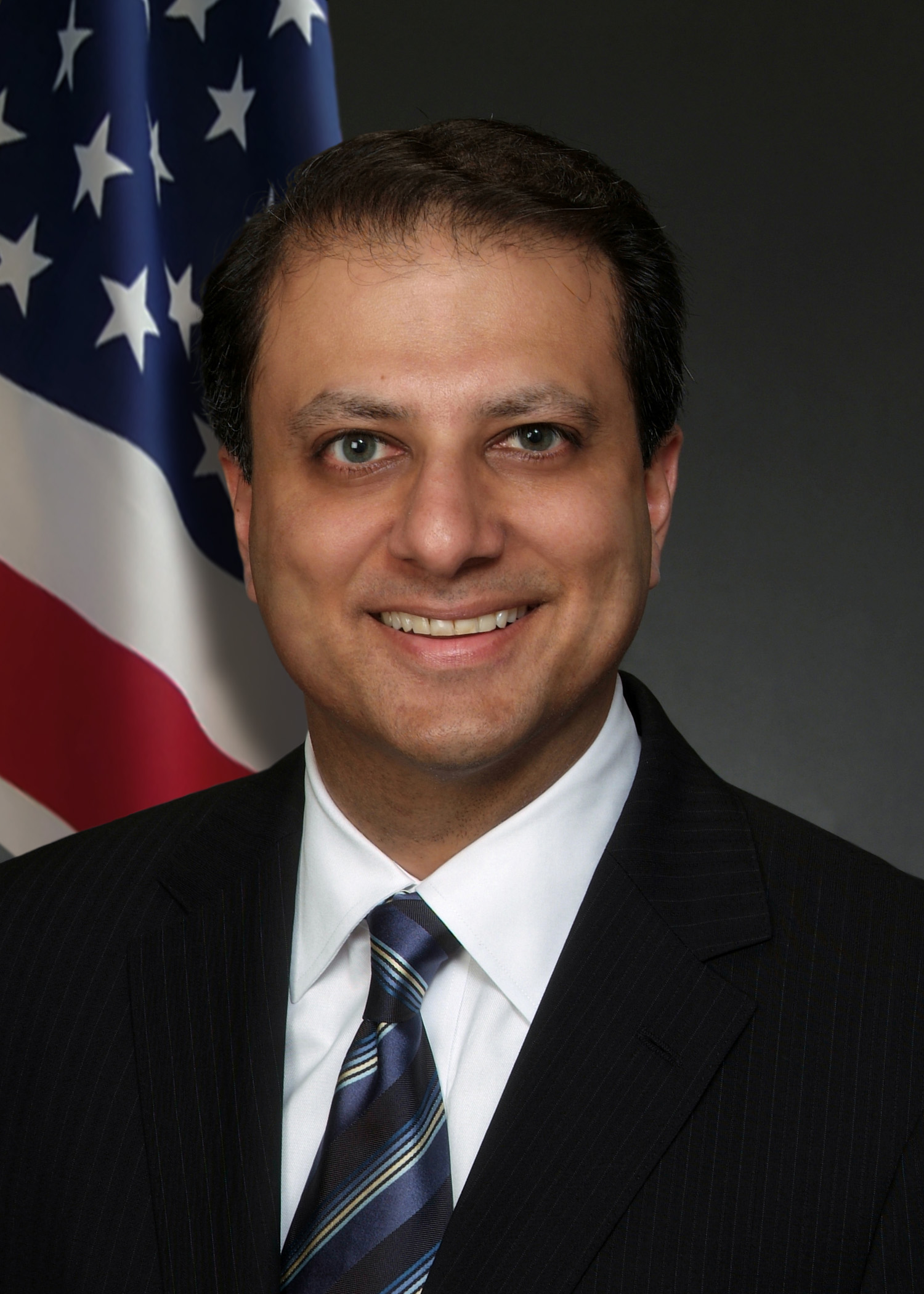
Preet Bharara

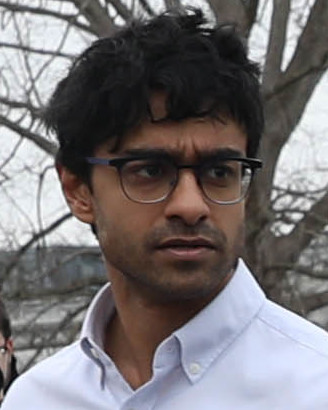
Saikat Chakrabarti

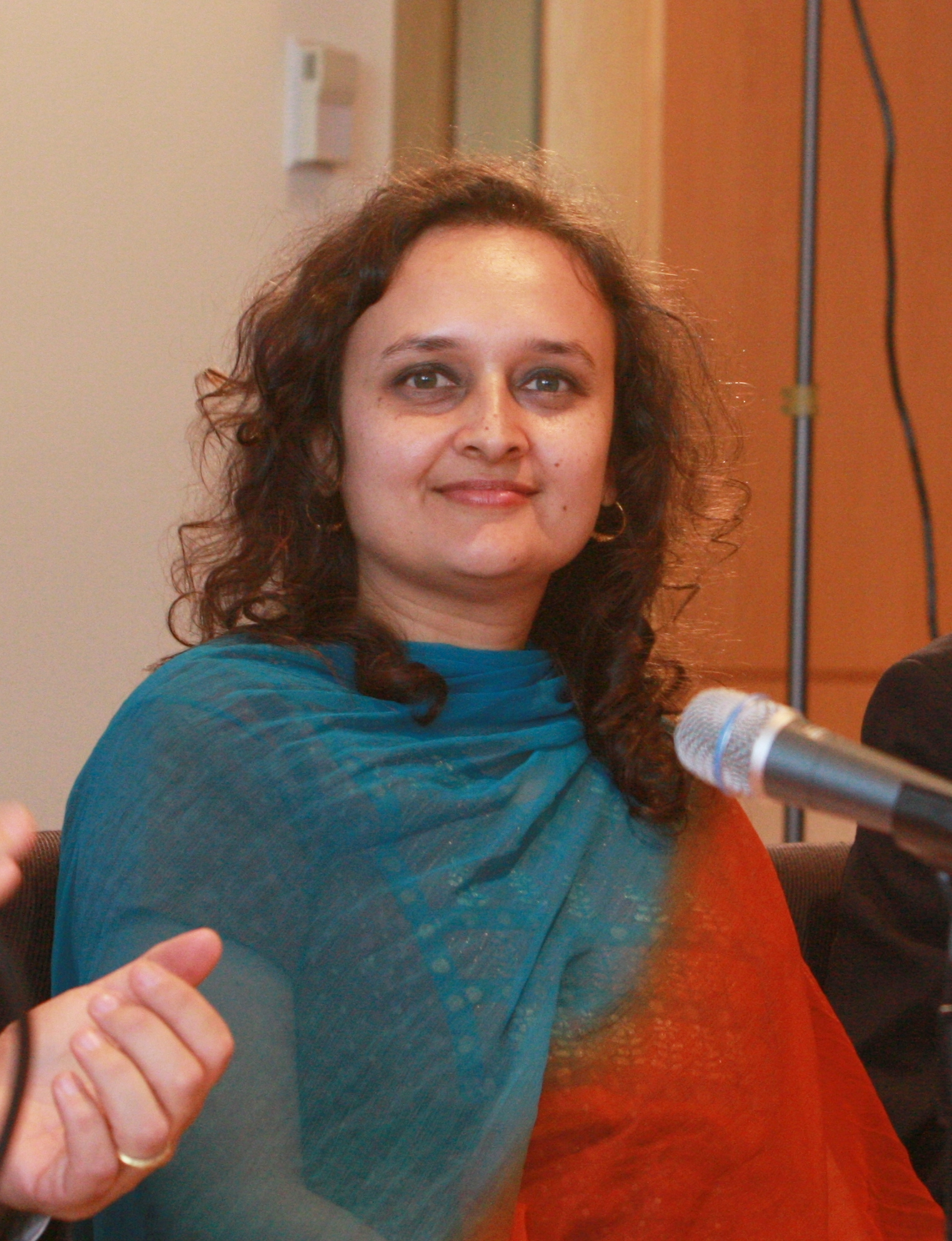
Bhairavi Desai

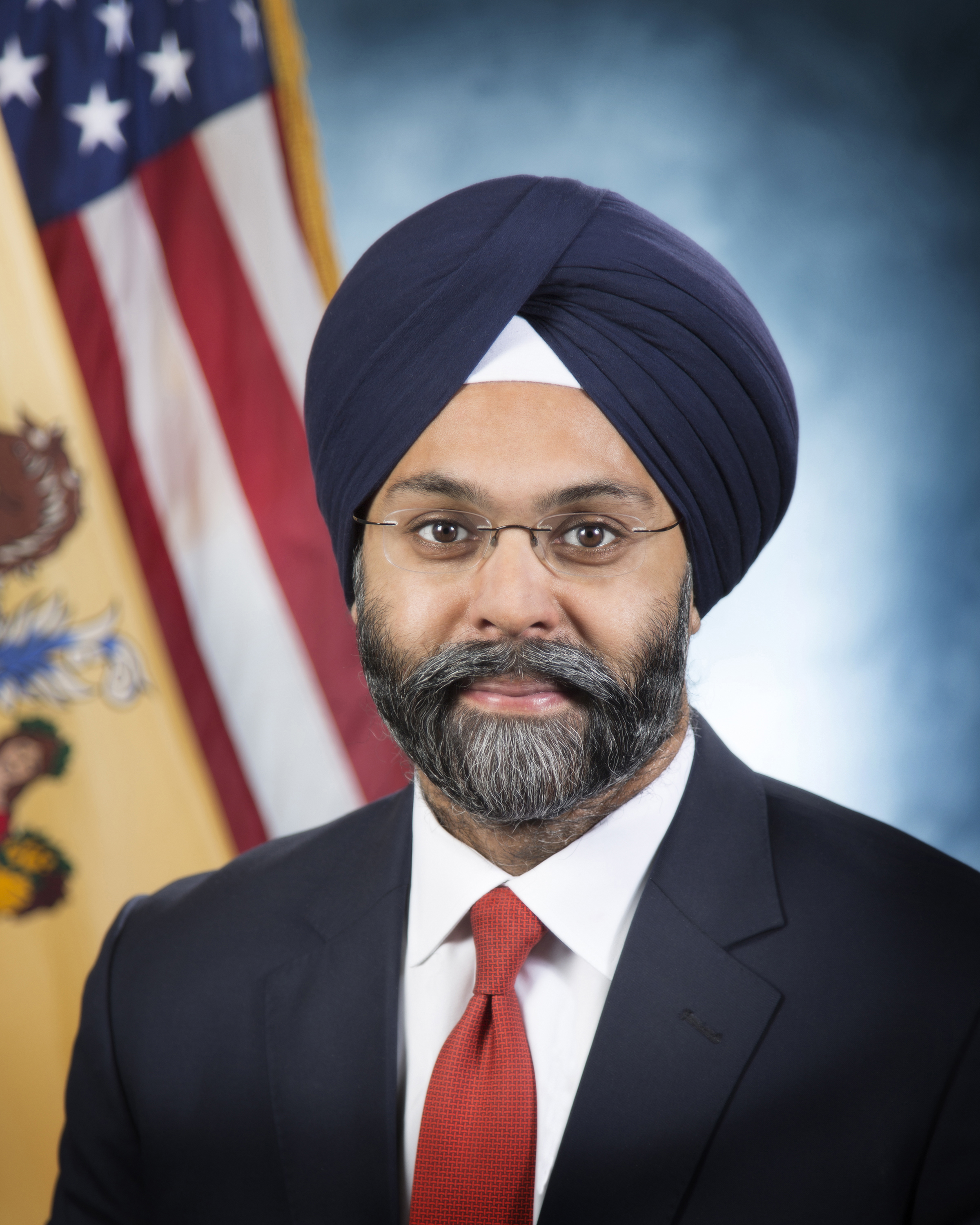
Gurbir Grewal

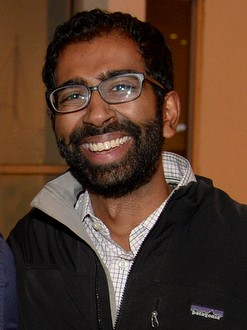
Shekar Krishnan

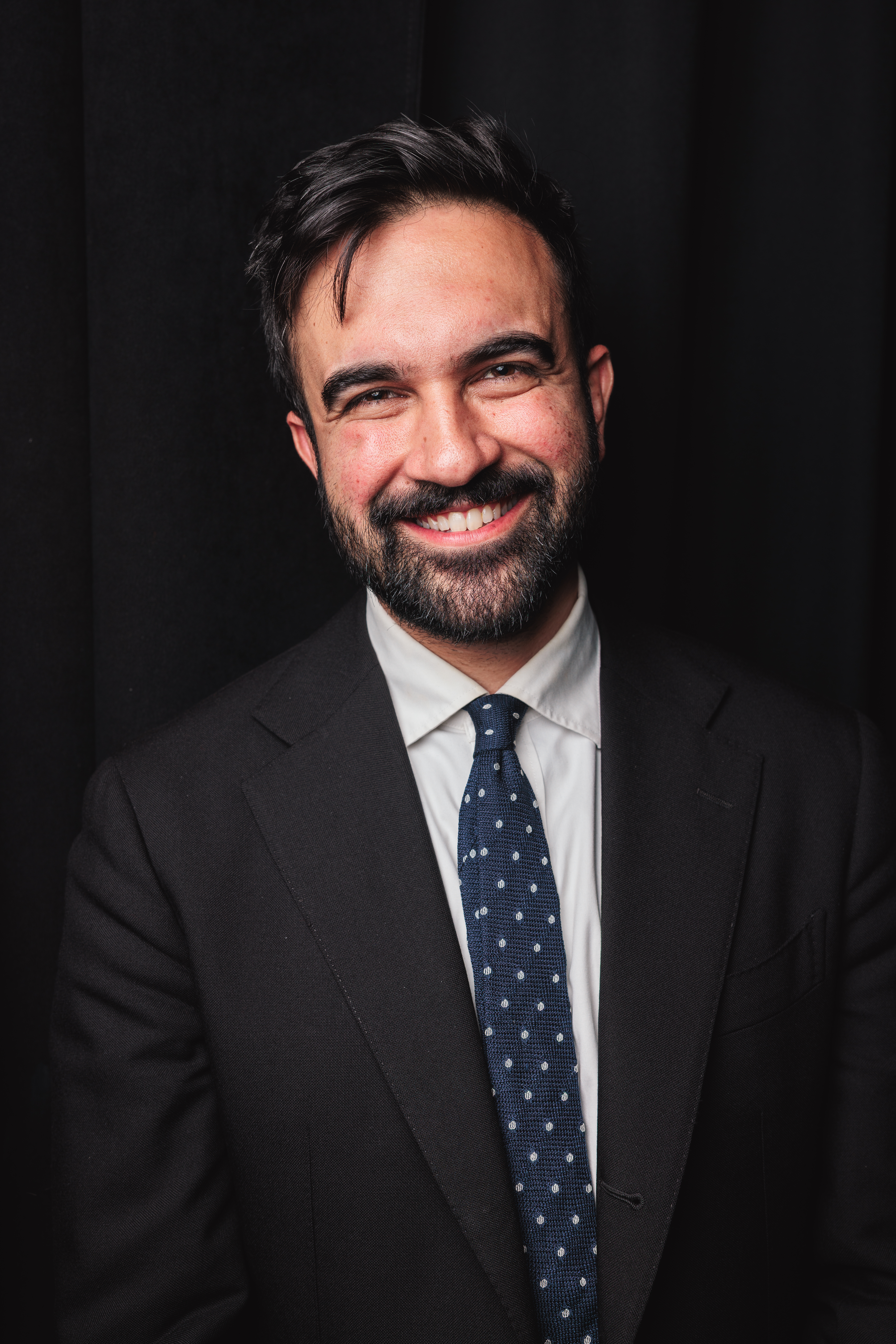
Zohran Mamdani

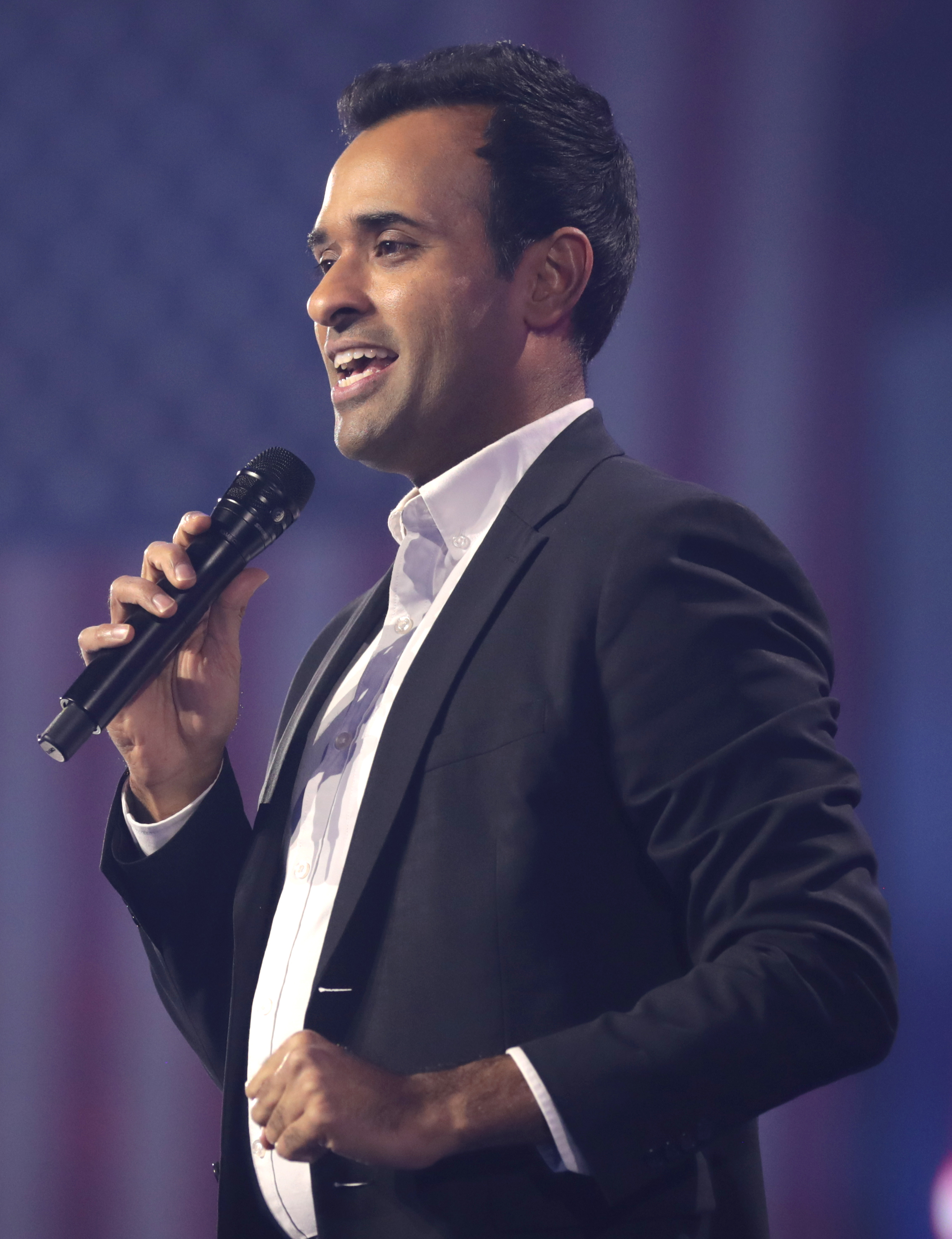
Vivek Ramaswamy

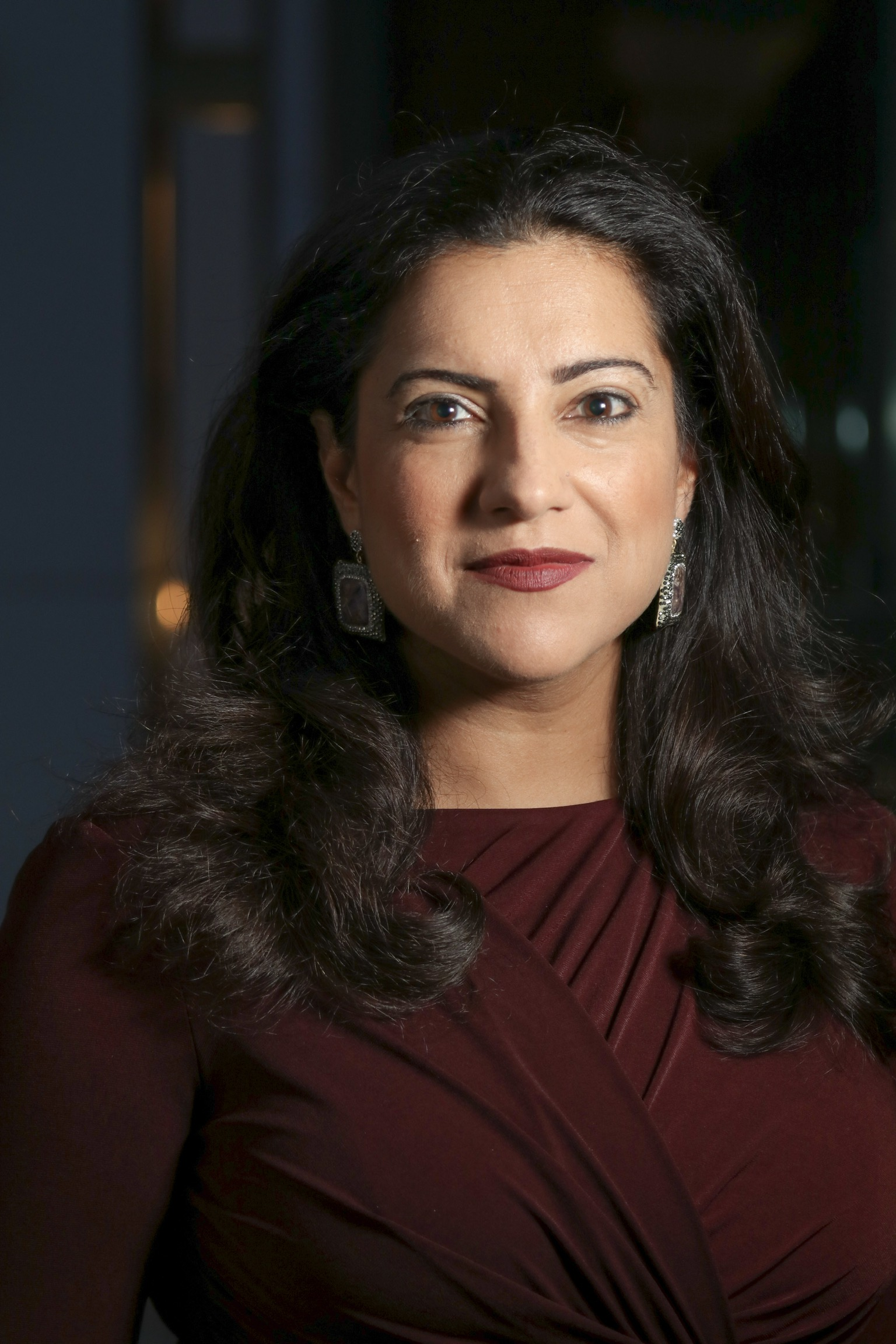
Reshma Saujani

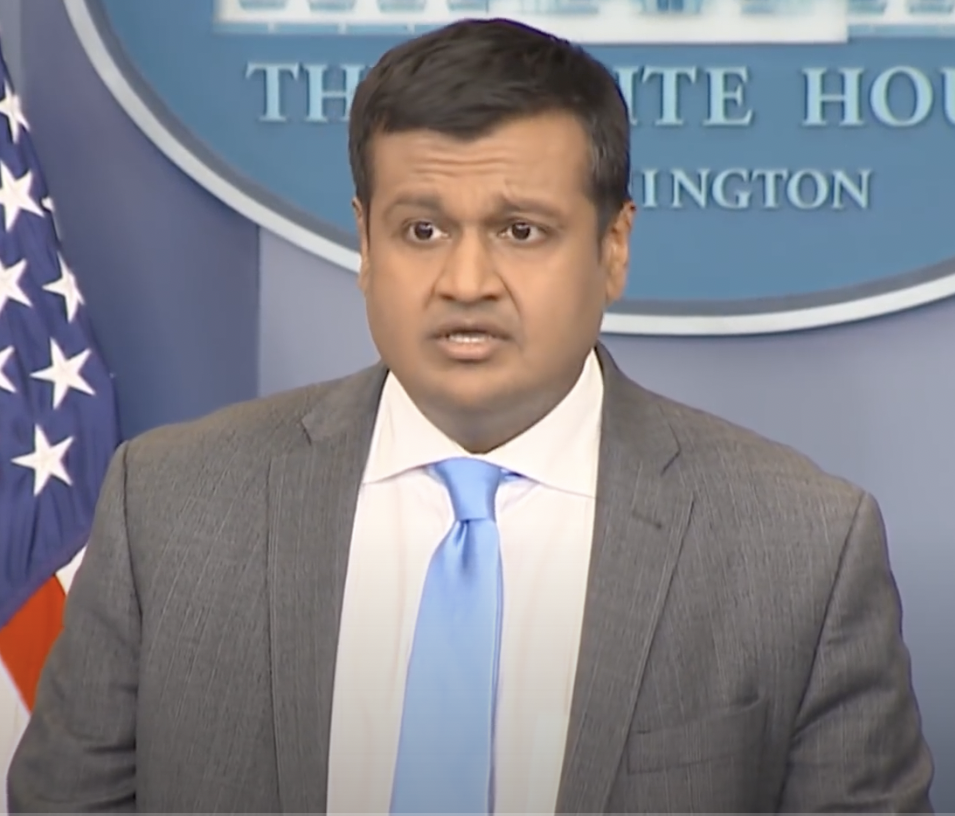
Raj Shah
Indian New Yorkers and New Jerseyans – Law, Politics, and Diplomacy
- Rohit Aggarwala – Commissioner, New York City Department of Environmental Protection and the chief climate officer of New York City
- Bhicaji Balsara – first Indian to become a naturalized U.S. citizen
- Ravinder Bhalla – mayor, Hoboken, New Jersey, first Sikh mayor in New Jersey
- Preet Bharara – former U.S. Attorney for the Southern District of New York
- Saikat Chakrabarti – U.S. Congressional aide
- Upendra J. Chivukula – Commissioner, New Jersey Board of Public Utilities
- Bhairavi Desai – founder and executive director, New York Taxi Workers Alliance
- Vin Gopal – New Jersey State Senator, representing the 11th District in Monmouth County
- Gurbir Grewal – New Jersey's 61st State Attorney General
- Sam Joshi – mayor, Edison, New Jersey
- Kris Kolluri – interim president and CEO of NJ Transit, the largest mass transit agency in New Jersey, appointed in December 2024 to serve through the remainder of New Jersey Governor Phil Murphy's term in office ending in January 2026
- Shekar Krishnan – New York City councilman, elected in November 2021, representing Jackson Heights and Elmhurst, Queens
- Zohran Mamdani – Mayor of New York City and member of the New York State Assembly, representing the 36th District, in Queens
- Raj Mukherji – member, New Jersey General Assembly, representing the 33rd District in Hudson County
- Jenifer Rajkumar – member, New York State Assembly, representing the 38th District, in Queens
- Vivek Ramaswamy – Republican candidate for 2024 U.S. presidential election
- Reshma Saujani – attorney and politician, founder of tech organization Girls Who Code
- Raj Shah – former White House Deputy Press Secretary
- Sterley Stanley – Assemblyman
- Balvir Singh, Assemblyman – first Sikh State Legislator in New Jersey New Jersey General Assembly
- Diya Vij – Commissioner, New York City Department of Cultural Affairs

=== Media ===
Rhona Fox

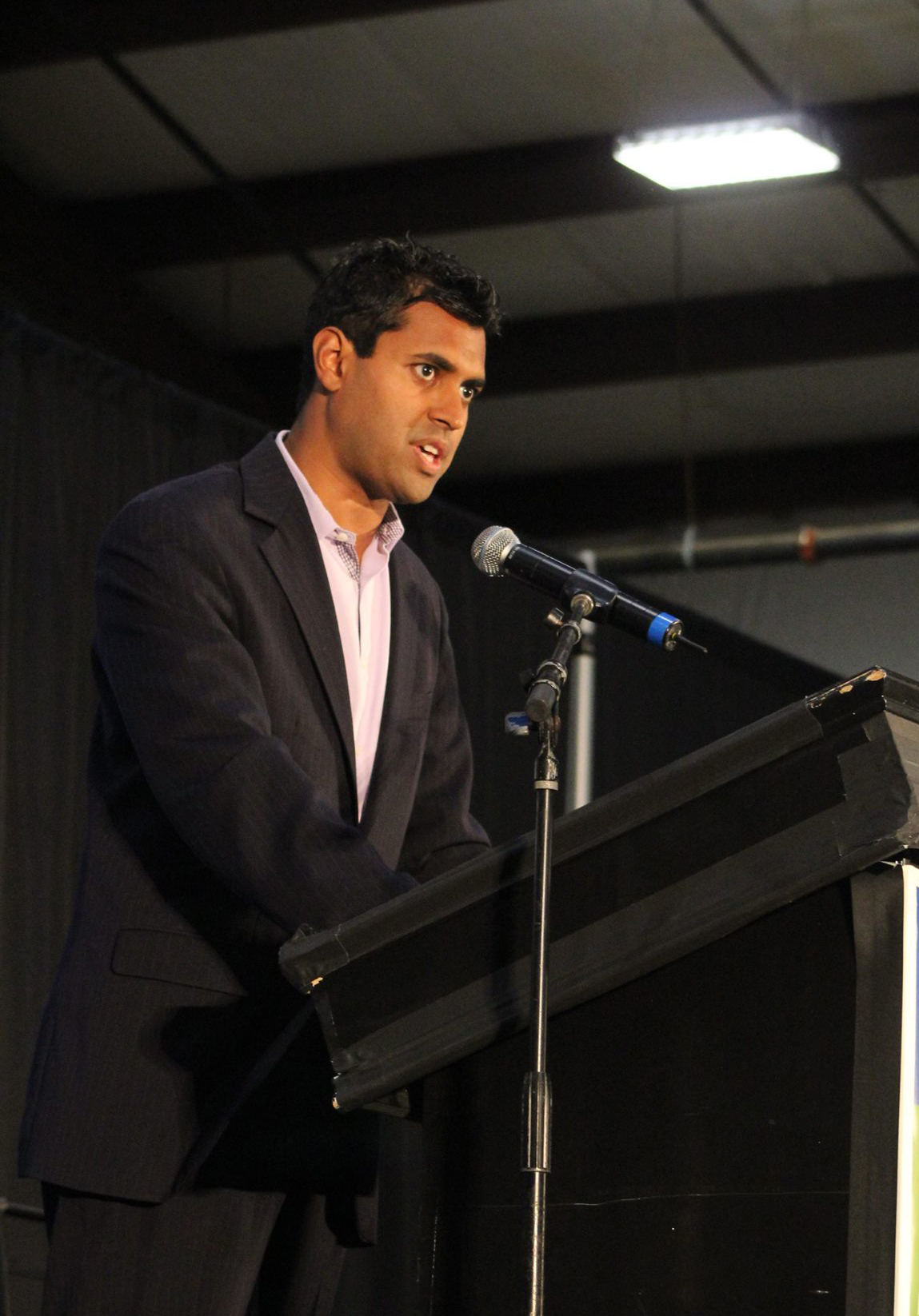
Vin Gopal

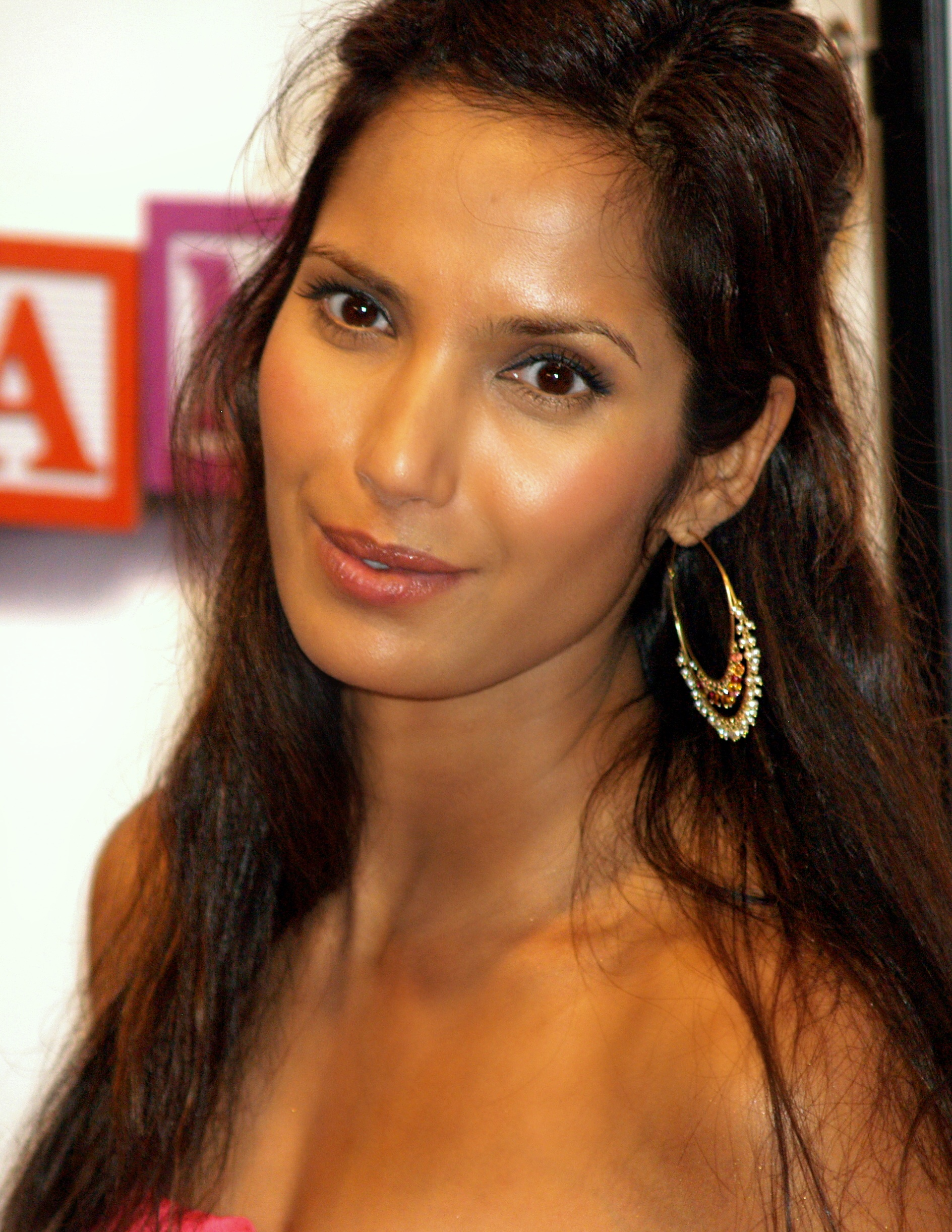
Padma Lakshmi

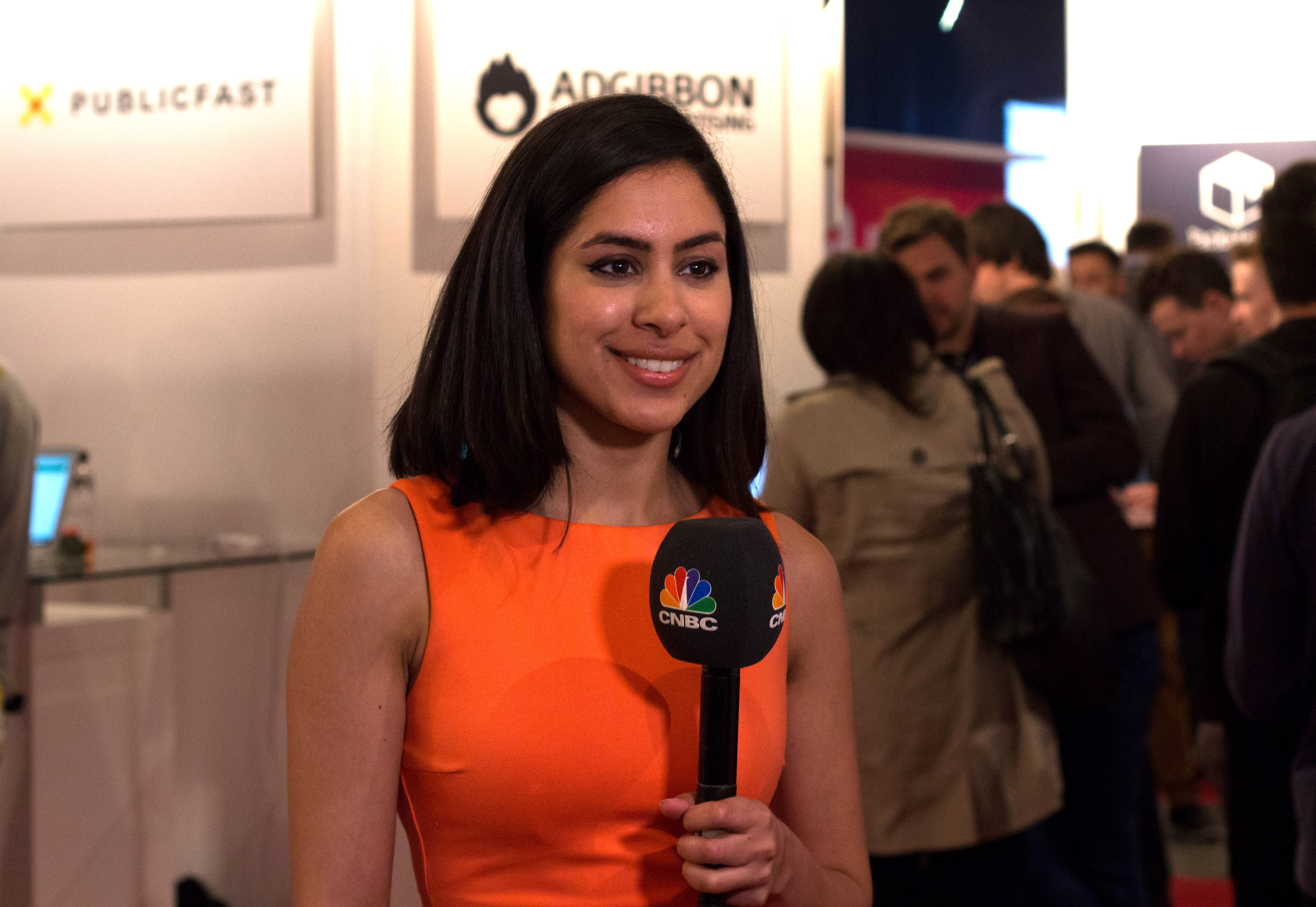
Seema Mody

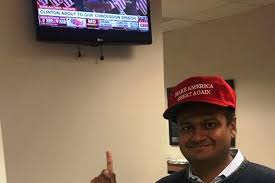
Raj Shah

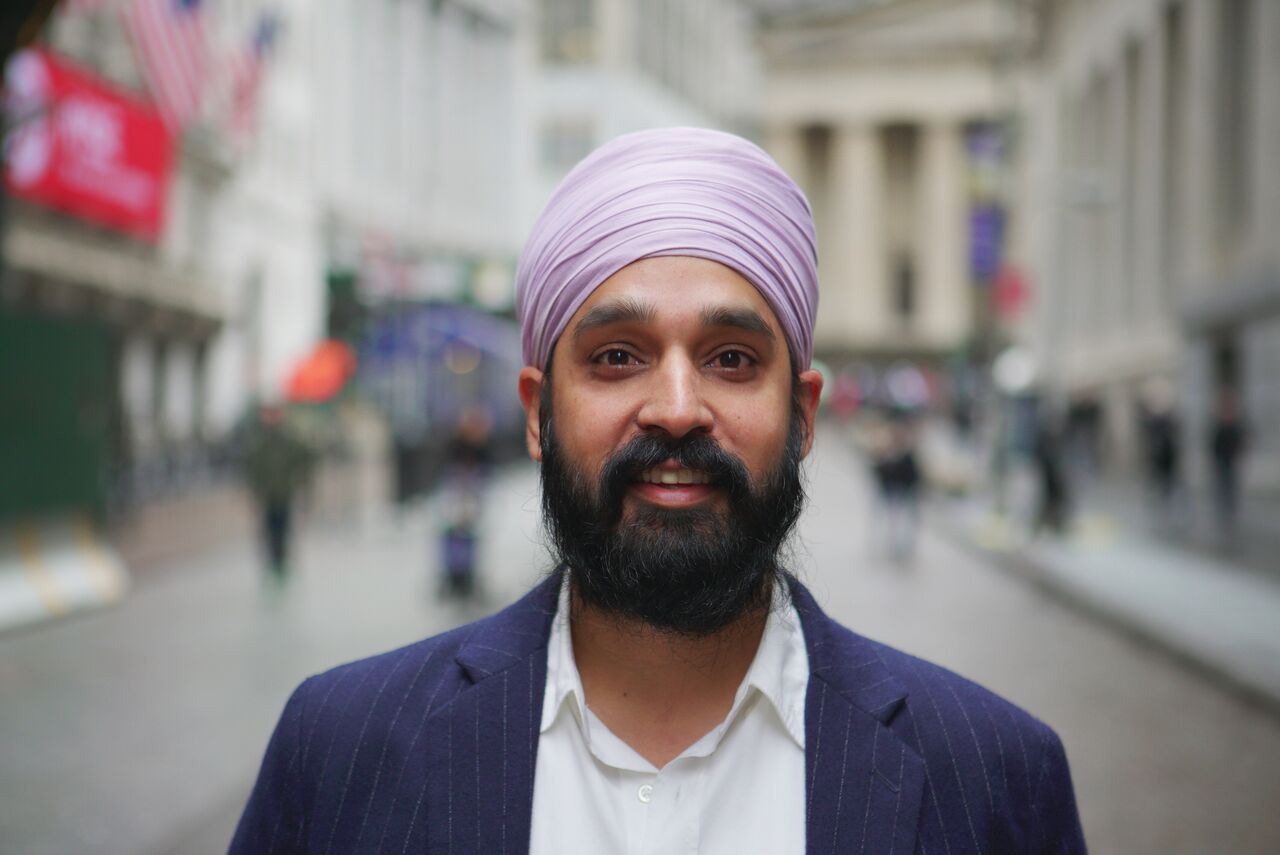
Simran Jeet Singh

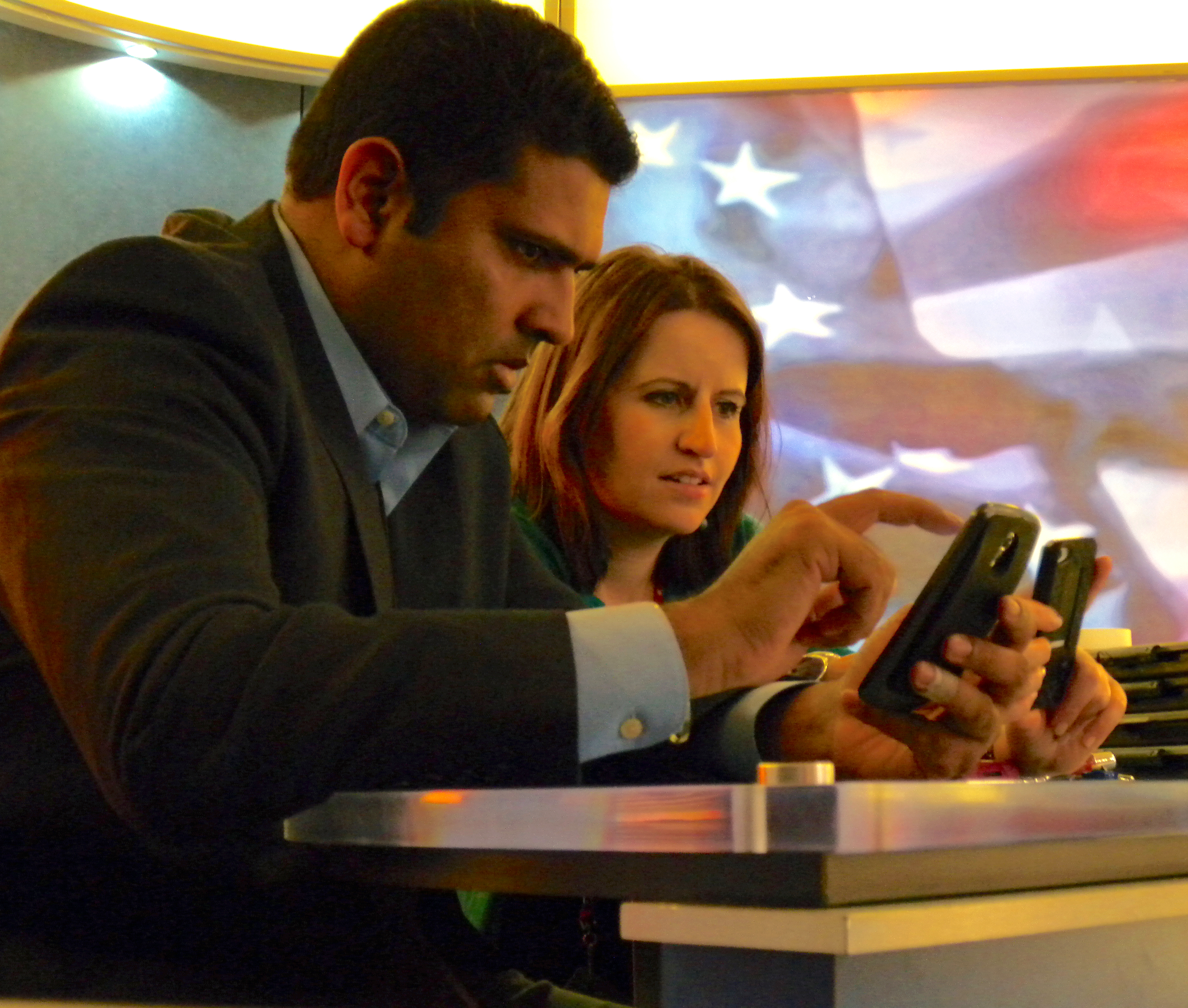
Hari Sreenivasan

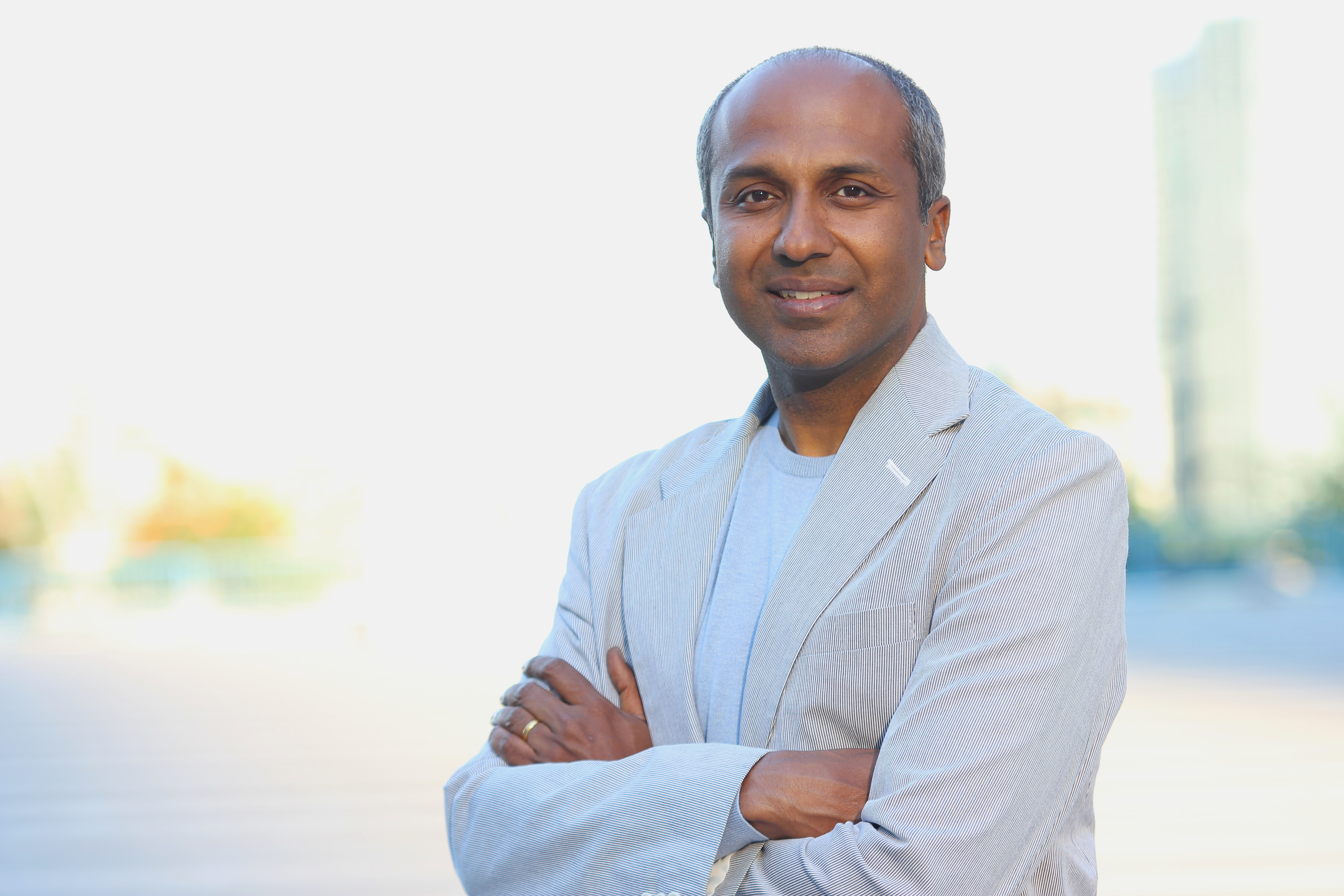
Sreenath Sreenivasan

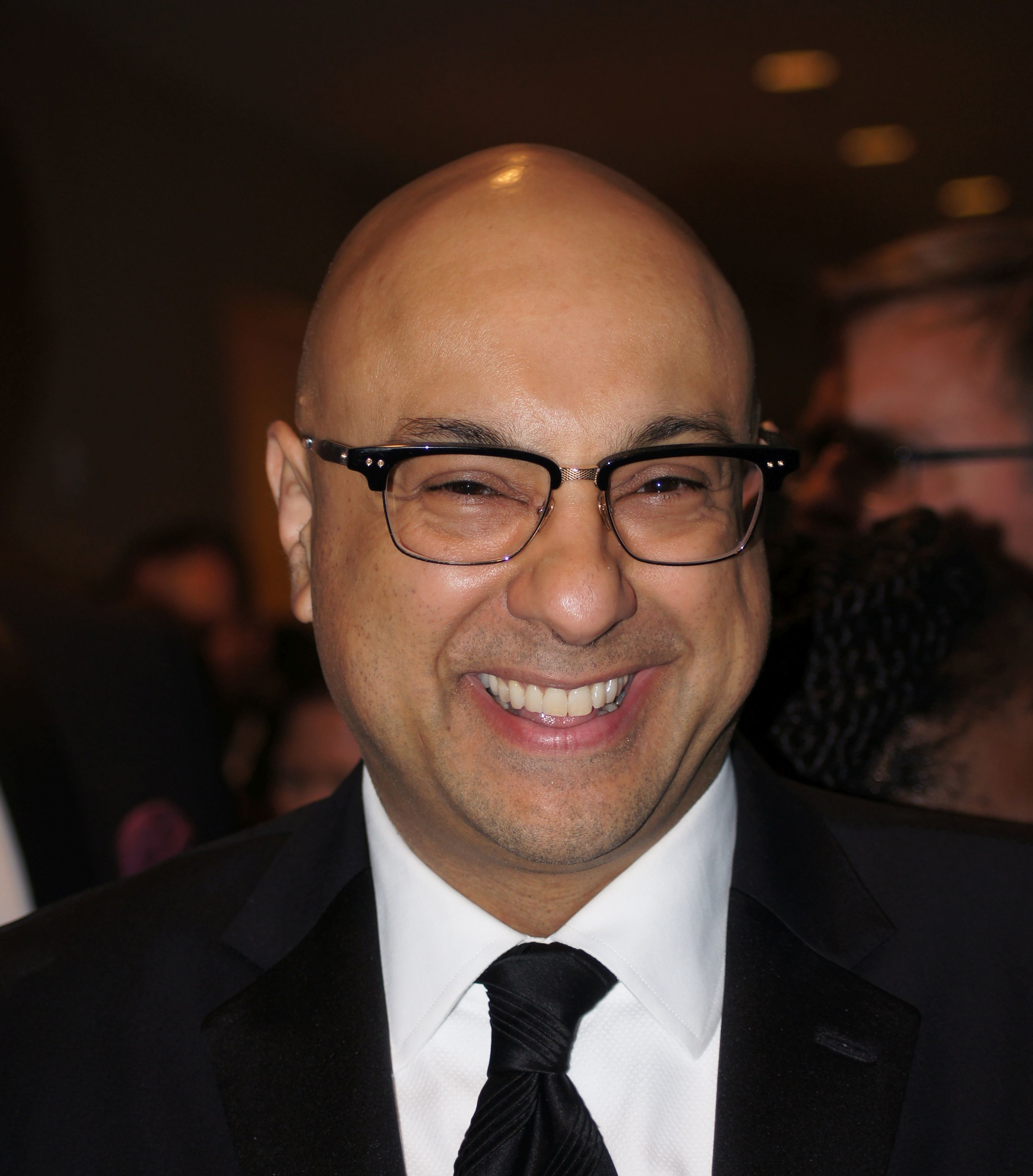
Ali Velshi

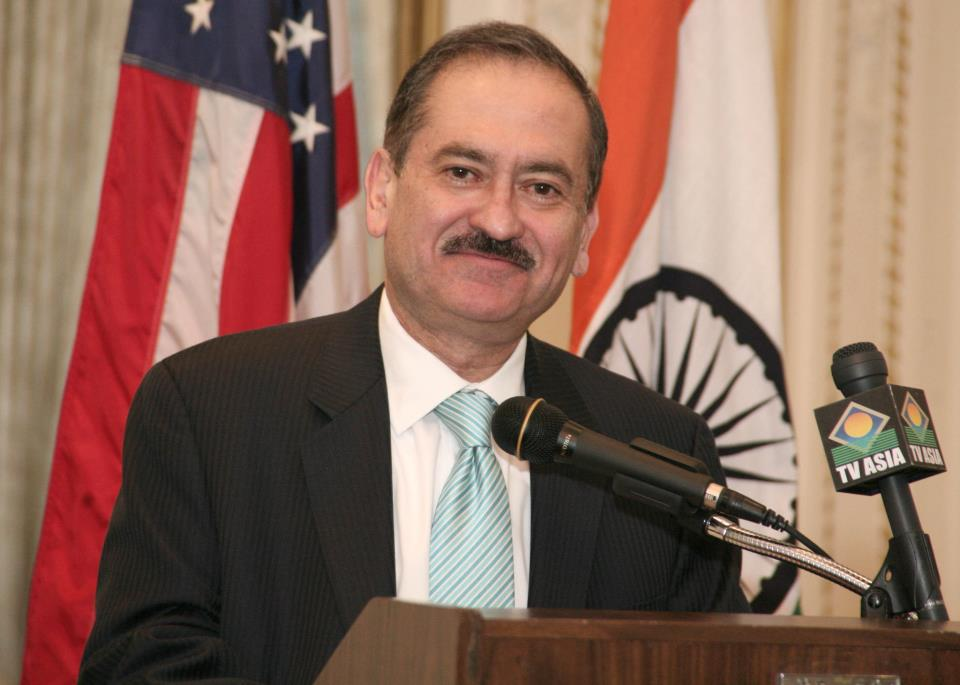
Rohit Vyas
Indian New Yorkers and New Jerseyans – Media

Indian Americans have emerged prominently in the New York City journalism sphere. This media subsection has been created to acknowledge this professional prominence.

- Rhona Fox – founder, soca music record label Fox Fuse
- Neeraj Khemlani – executive, Hearst Communications, CBS
- Priya Krishna – food writer, The New York Times
- Sukanya Krishnan – news anchor, WNYW
- Padma Lakshmi – television host, cookbook author, actress, and model
- Sapna Maheshwari – business journalist, The New York Times
- Apoorva Mandavilli – health and science journalist, The New York Times
- Ved Mehta – late, blind staff writer, The New Yorker
- Seema Mody – journalist, CNBC
- Vinita Nair – television journalist
- Raju Narisetti - publishing director at McKinsey & Company
- Simran Jeet Singh – journalist, Religion News Service
- Hari Sreenivasan – journalist, anchor, PBS NewsHour Weekend
- Sreenath Sreenivasan – technology journalist
- Ali Velshi – journalist, MSNBC
- Arun Venugopal – WNYC and Gothamist
- Rohit Vyas – journalist
- Fareed Zakaria – journalist, author, and television host, CNN

== See also ==
- Asian Americans in New York City
- Indians in Britain
- Chinese people in New York City
- Curry Row
- Bangladeshis in New York City
- Demographics of New York City
- Filipinos in the New York metropolitan area
- Fuzhounese in New York City
- Japanese in New York City
- Koreans in New York City
- Russians in New York City
- Taiwanese people in New York City
- Caribbean immigration to New York City
