= Devon Avenue =

Major road in Chicago, Illinois, US

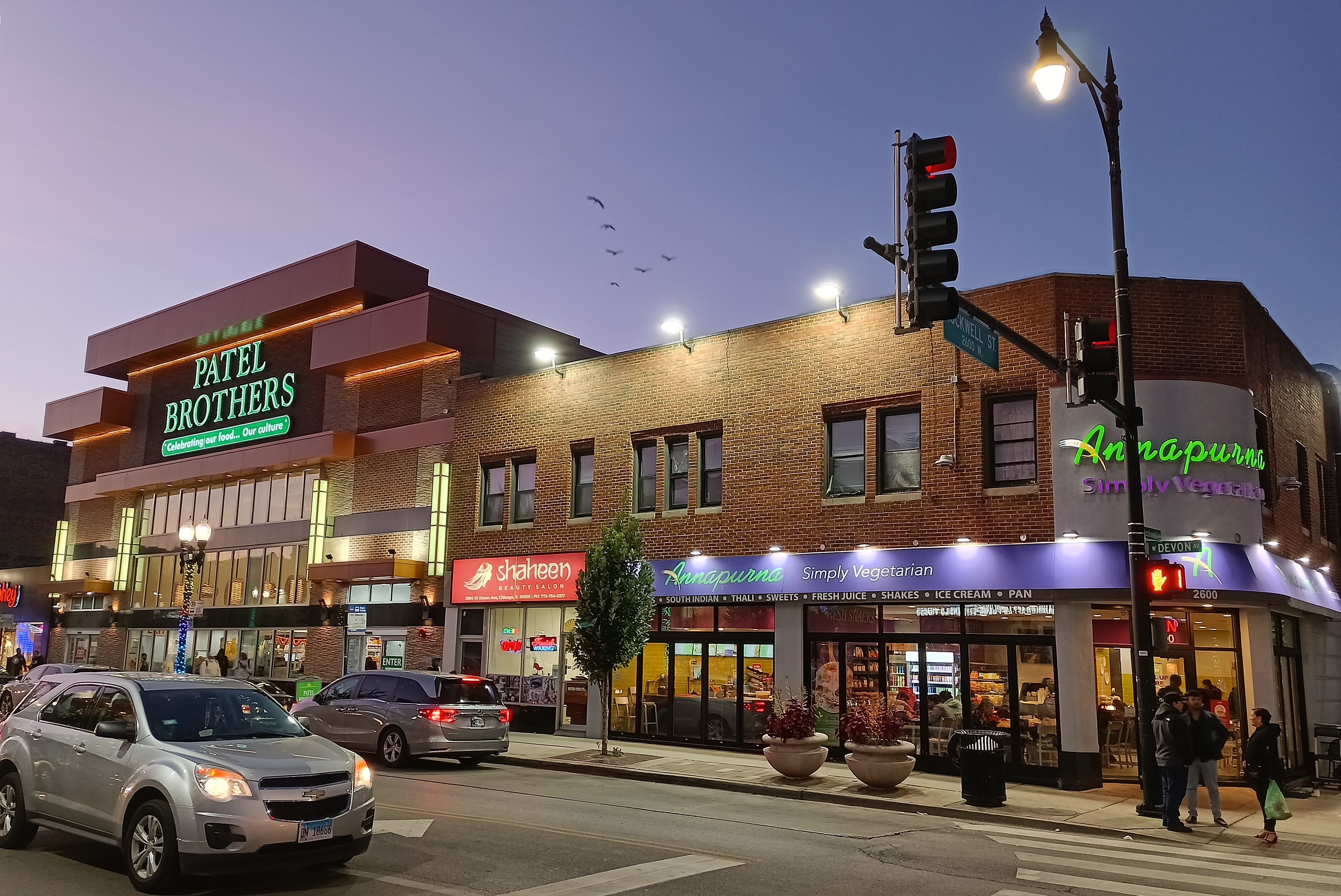
- Devon Avenue's Little India in 2022
- Interactive map of Devon Avenue
- Former name: Church Road
- Part of: CR 6 (DuPage); CR B11 (Cook)
- Location: Chicago, Lincolnwood, Niles, Park Ridge, Rosemont, Des Plaines, Elk Grove Village, Bensenville, Wood Dale, Itasca, Roselle, Bartlett
- Coordinates: 41.9962°N 87.8469°W
- West end: Bartlett Road in Bartlett
- East end: Broadway Street/Sheridan Road (1200 W) in Chicago

Devon Avenue /dɪˈvɒn/ is a major east-west street in the Chicago metropolitan area. It begins at Sheridan Road near the Lake Michigan lakeshore in the City of Chicago, and it runs west until merging with Higgins Road near O'Hare International Airport. Devon continues on the opposite side of the airport and runs intermittently through Chicago's northwestern suburbs. In the northwest suburbs west of O'Hare Airport, Devon Avenue is the boundary between Cook and DuPage Counties. The street is located at 6400 N in Chicago's address system.

== History ==
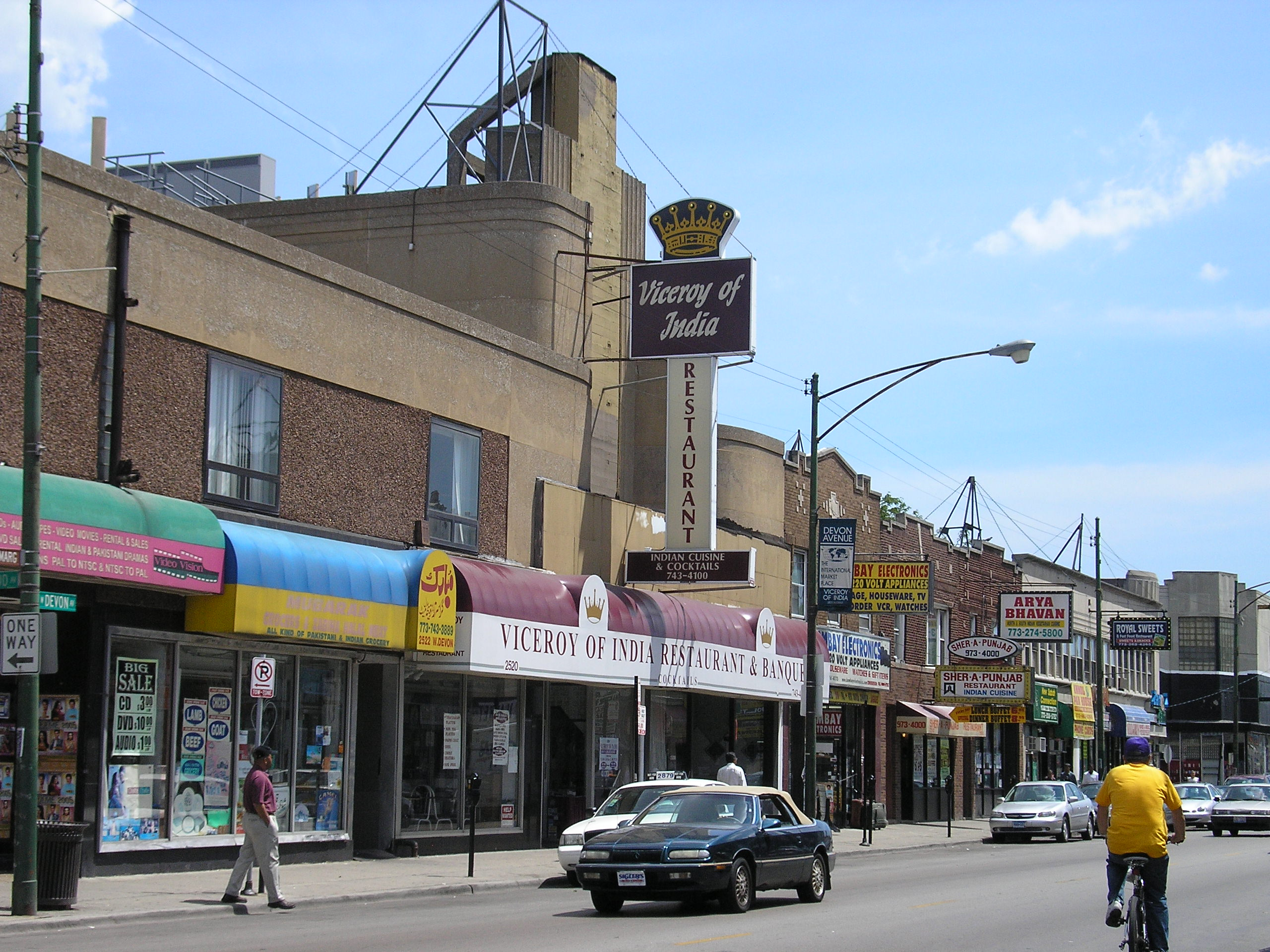
Another view circa 2006

Devon Avenue was originally known as Church Road, but it was renamed in the 1880s by Edgewater developer John Lewis Cochran after Devon station on the Main Line north of Philadelphia. The street has been settled by many Asian immigrant groups, which is perhaps most evident between Kedzie and Ridge Avenues in West Ridge, Chicago. Here, one will encounter concentrations of Jewish Americans, Assyrian Americans, Russian Americans, Indian Americans, Pakistani Americans, Bangladeshi Americans, and Pashtun Americans. Portions of Devon in this area have been renamed in honor of Golda Meir, Mahatma Gandhi, Muhammad Ali Jinnah, and Sheikh Mujibur Rahman.

The organization "Friends of Refugees of Eastern Europe" (better known as "F.R.E.E. of Chicago") is headquartered in the Orthodox-Jewish section of Devon. As a result, most Soviet/CIS immigrants of Jewish ancestry settled around this area upon arrival in Chicago. After acclimation, these residents would tend to move to the north suburbs (especially Skokie and Buffalo Grove). Because the vast majority of the Jewish diaspora residing in the former Soviet Union have emigrated since its collapse, the vibrancy of this particular area of Devon is not as apparent as it was in the 1970s, 1980s, and early 1990s (which were periods of mass emigration). Nevertheless, a significant proportion of these immigrants, especially the elderly, have remained on Devon.

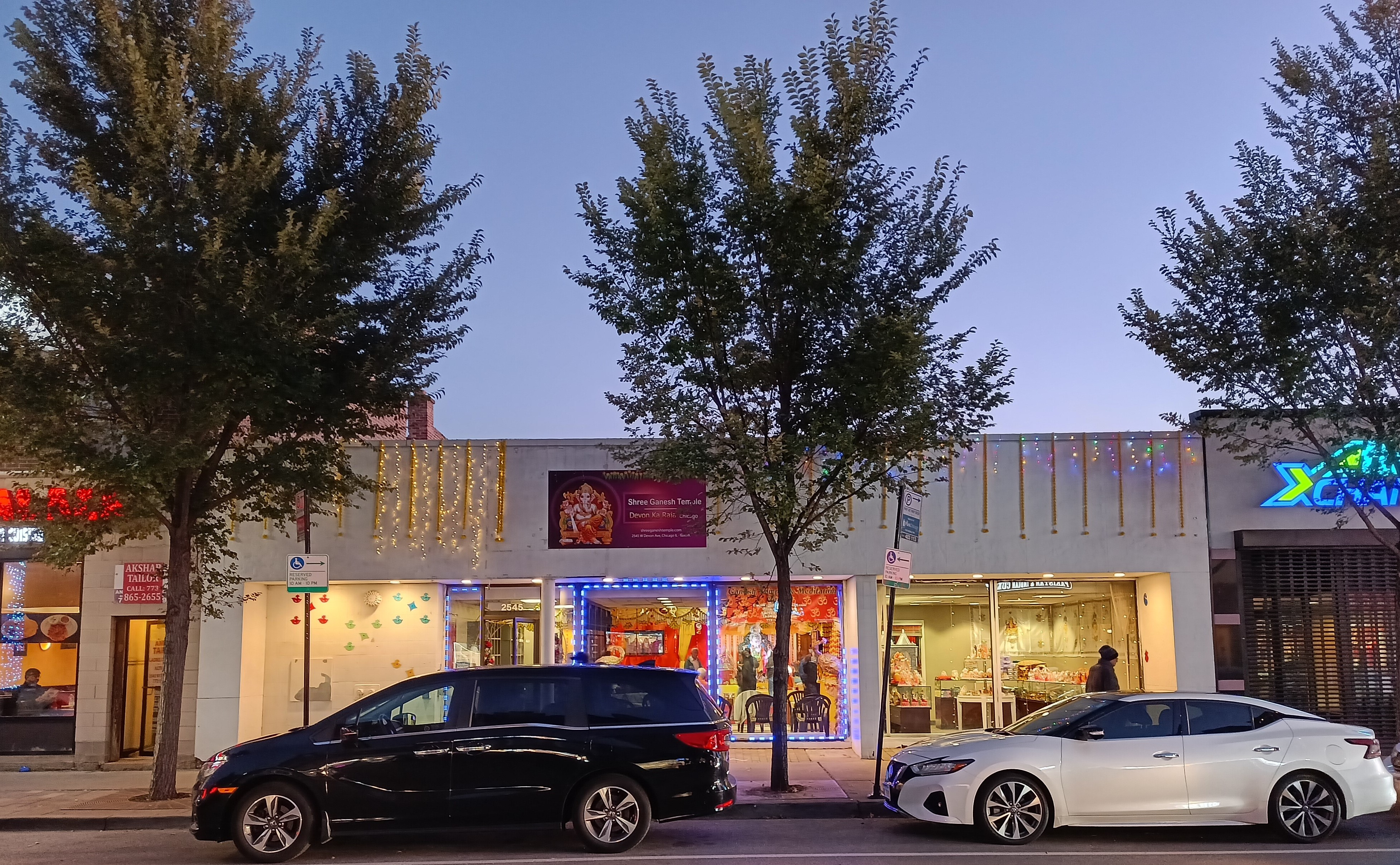
Shree Ganesh Temple, the first Hindu temple on Devon Avenue

Devon's Desi corridor, also known as Chicago's Little India, is one of the best-known and largest communities of its kind in North America. It exists mainly on Devon between Ravenswood Ave. and California Ave. South Asian shops, restaurants and grocery stores including the first location of Patel Brothers, that opened in 1974, abound along this strip, and it has become a popular tourist destination. Vivek Mukherjee of Rediff.com writes, "There are similar desi markets in New Jersey, at the famous Oak Tree Road or in the Bay Area, but nothing like Devon Street. [...] Devon Street's sidewalks are even speckled with the paan stains".

More recently, Devon has become a hub for a burgeoning population of Rohingya refugees fleeing persecution in Myanmar, with more than 2,000 Rohingya estimates to have settled nearby in West Ridge and Rogers Park. The Rohingya Culture Center was established in 2016 to serve the needs of the growing community.

Other points of interest along Devon Avenue include Superdawg, Loyola University Chicago, DePaul University's O'Hare Campus, Bryn Mawr Country Club, Hanna Sacks Bais Yaakov High School, Edgebrook Golf Course, Thillens Stadium, Novelty Par Mini Golf Course, parts of the Forest Preserve and Misericordia/Heart of Mercy, serving children with developmental disabilities.

== Transportation ==
The Chicago Transit Authority bus service 155 Devon serves Devon Avenue between Sheridan Road and Kedzie Avenue; it provides a transfer point to the Chicago "L" Red Line at Loyola station. The 36 Broadway, 88 Higgins and 151 Sheridan serve the street for shorter segments.
