= Patel Brothers =

Indian-American supermarket chain

Patel Brothers, Inc.
- Type: Private
- Industry: Retail, Indian Grocery, South Asian sweets, spices, beverages, Indian snacks, Fresh Produce, Prepared Indian Foods
- Founded: September 1974; 52 years ago Chicago, Illinois, U.S.
- Founders: Mafat Patel; Tulsi Patel; Amrit Patel; Ratish "Ricky" Patel
- Headquarters: Chicago, Illinois, U.S.
- Number of locations: 51
- Area served: United States: New Jersey, New York, Pennsylvania, Arizona, California, Connecticut, Florida, Georgia, Illinois, Indiana, Kentucky, Maryland, Massachusetts and New Hampshire (Greater, Boston), Michigan, North Carolina, Ohio, Tennessee, Texas, and Virginia
- Parent: PB Brands LLC
- Website: patelbros.com

Patel Brothers, Inc. (doing business as Patel Brothers) is an Indian-American supermarket chain based in the United States. Patel Brothers is the world’s largest supermarket chain serving the Indian diaspora, with 52 locations in 20 U.S. states—primarily located in the Eastern United States, due to its large Indian population and geographical supply chain constraints, and with the East Windsor/Monroe Township, New Jersey location representing the world’s largest and busiest Indian grocery store outside India. As of 2024, Patel Brothers has six more stores planned in the next two years. The chain was founded in Chicago by brothers Mafat and Tulsi Patel and is operated by three generations of the family since its inception.

Patel Brothers has expanded into a nationwide supermarket chain with dozens of locations across the United States.

== History ==
Mafat lived in Bhandu, a small village in Gujarat, along with his younger brother Tulsi and other family members before attending Youngstown State University for a Master's in Engineering in 1968. After finishing his engineering degree, he moved from Ohio to Chicago to work as an engineer at Jefferson Electrical Co. Mafat found that Indian groceries were very expensive and scarce in Chicago, which inspired him to start a grocery store. The first Patel Brothers store opened on Devon Avenue in 1974, and was operated jointly by Mafat, Tulsi and his wife Aruna, the latter two of which had immigrated from India to help with the store.

As of 2022, the store on Devon Avenue in Chicago, has been remodeled and operating as their original flagship store. Patel Brothers maintains its trademarks under PB Brands LLC.

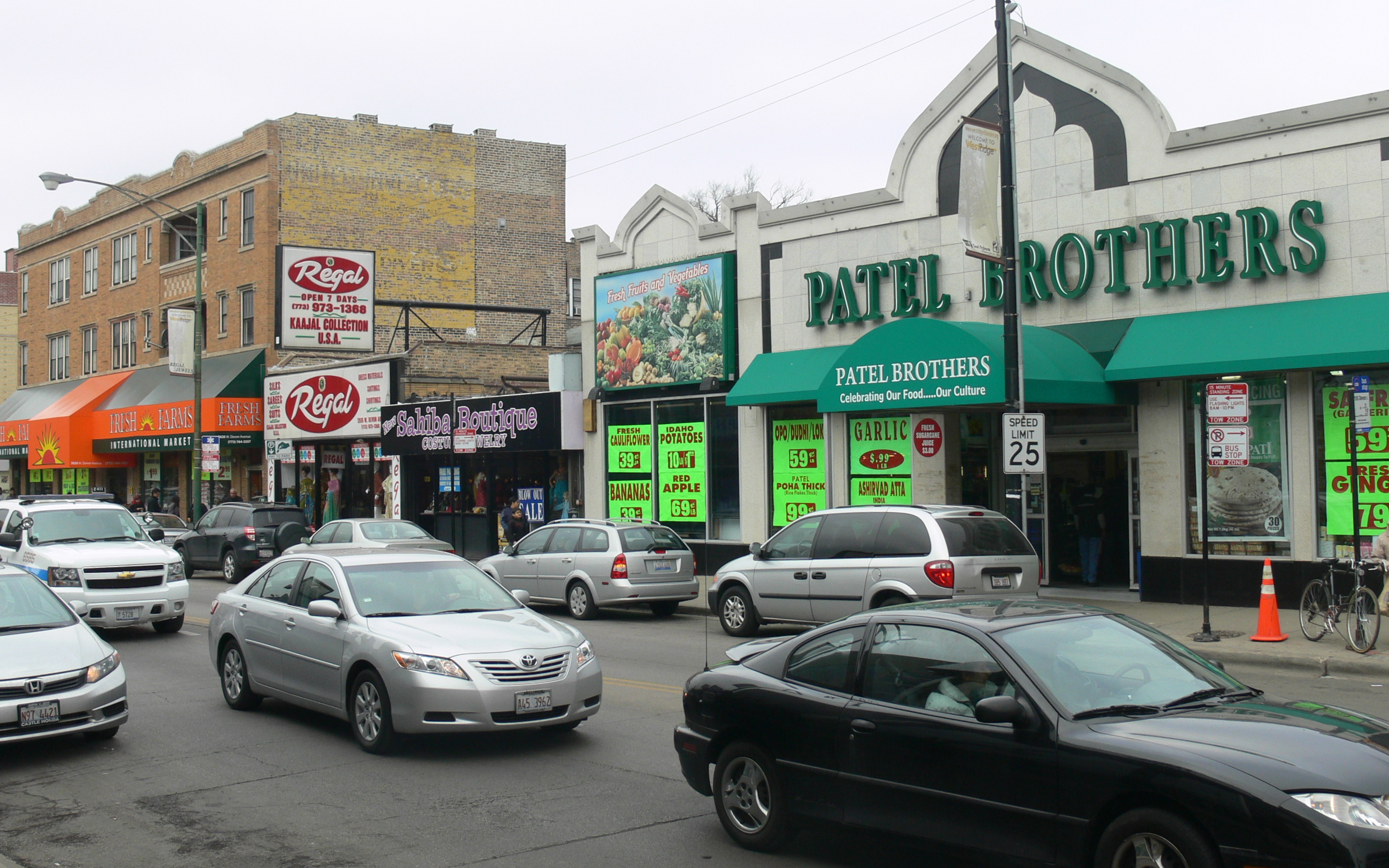
The first Patel Brothers grocery store, on Devon Avenue in Chicago, that opened in 1974. It was completely rebuilt and reopened in 2020–2021.

Patel Brothers is a family business. The retail chain's day-to-day operations are handled by members of the Patel family. Mafat and Tulsi Patel still own the original store in Chicago and various trademarks. Mafat's and Tulsi's family members operate the two New York warehouses in Queens. They have strongly built the company on the East Coast. Other family members have since expanded the operation across the midwest and southeast states and continue to do so.

== Locations ==
=== Current locations ===
Variant logo used by the locations in Jackson Heights, Queens (pictured); Flushing, Queens; Hyattsville, Maryland; and Waltham, Massachusetts

After starting out in Chicago, Patel Brothers was a major success with shoppers coming from all over the Midwestern United States: Wisconsin, Minnesota, Indiana, Michigan, Iowa, and Kansas. The retail chain has spread across the United States, with a concentration in the Eastern United States. As of April 2023, the chain had 51 locations, 8 in New Jersey (notably along Oak Tree Road in Edison and Iselin, which has three locations), 5 in Texas, 4 in New York, Florida, and Illinois each, and the rest are spread throughout the eastern United States with only two locations in the western United States: one store in Santa Clara near San Jose, California, and a second in Chandler, Arizona, near Phoenix. Patel Brothers are generally located in retail parks along with other stores and restaurants. As of 2022, the largest and busiest store is the ultramodern branch located in East Windsor, New Jersey, which includes an outdoor pani puri bar. The New York/New Jersey locations additionally carry specialty Indian health foods such as jamun juice.

The locations in Iselin, New Jersey, New York east of the Garden State Parkway, Jersey City, North Brunswick, New Jersey, and Ridgeland, Mississippi operate under the cash and carry concept. Several Patel Brothers locations including the McKinney, Texas; Naperville, Illinois; and Monroeville, Pennsylvania stores have green and yellow auto rickshaws near the store to maintain India's cultural identity in America. Some locations go by names other than Patel Brothers: the Manchester, Connecticut store operates under the name Patel Foods. Patel Brothers is not affiliated with the gas station called Patel's Grocery in Homer, Georgia, Shah and Patel Indian Burmese grocery store in Rockville, Maryland, or Patel Foods Indo-Pak grocery store in Overland Park, Kansas. The reason why many Indian grocery stores have similar names to Patel Brothers is that PB Brands, LLC only has trademarks for the names Patel Brothers, Patel's, and Patel's Cash and Carry and likely also because Patel is one of the most common surnames in the US Indian diaspora.

There are Patel Brothers locations in Queens; central Jersey; in India Square in Jersey City; on Devon Avenue's Desi Street in Chicago; ≥and Patel Plaza (retail park leased by Patel Brothers) in Decatur, Georgia, where they are located in ethnic enclaves known as Little India, next to many other Indian restaurants and stores.

=== Former locations ===
Previously in Canada, Patel Brothers used to operate three stores in the Greater Toronto Area in Scarborough, Etobicoke, and Mississauga, which are now operated by Canada-based Panchvati Supermarket, and a store in Sugar Land in Greater Houston.

== Brands and products ==
After Mafat and Tulsi Patel started their career as grocers they changed gears toward prepackaged ethnic foods. In 1991, they introduced a variety of authentic foods under the umbrella of Raja Foods LLC, which supplies 60% of Patel Brothers products. Raja Foods LLC operates under seven brands, four of which are Patel Brothers original brands:

- SWAD (Best Taste in Town) is an original Patel Brothers brand and is the main brand for Patel Brothers products. SWAD is the largest selling Indian food brand in the USA. Swad (स्वाद) is a Hindi word meaning taste. The main products of the SWAD brand are ghee, oil, lentils, beans, nuts, and spices.
- Patel Brothers Celebrating India is also a Patel Brothers original brand.
- Patel's is another Patel Brothers brand
- Anarkali is also a Patel Brothers original brand.
- Noorjehan

Patel Brothers sells South Asian cuisine including Indian, Pakistani, and Bangladeshi food products. Their products include beverages, canned and packaged goods, condiments, ghee and oil, grains, health and beauty products, instant mix, kitchen products, lentils and beans, ready to eat food, Indian snacks, South Asian sweets, spices, spice blends, and spiritual items.

Patel Brothers are also well known for its International Grocery Items, which sell in NYC and North Jersey to several restaurants serving international cuisines even during the pandemic.

In 2023, Patel Brothers debuted a line of Diwali patterned paper plates and cups.

== In the news and popular culture ==
In December 2017, Patel Brothers co-founder Mafat Patel was featured in Zee TV's Those Who Made It Season Finale.

In 2024, the Food and Drug Administration (FDA) recommended recalls for ground cinnamon from six distributors, including Swad from Patel Brothers.
