= Curry Row =

Ethnic enclave in Manhattan, New York

Coordinates: 40°43′37″N 73°59′15″W

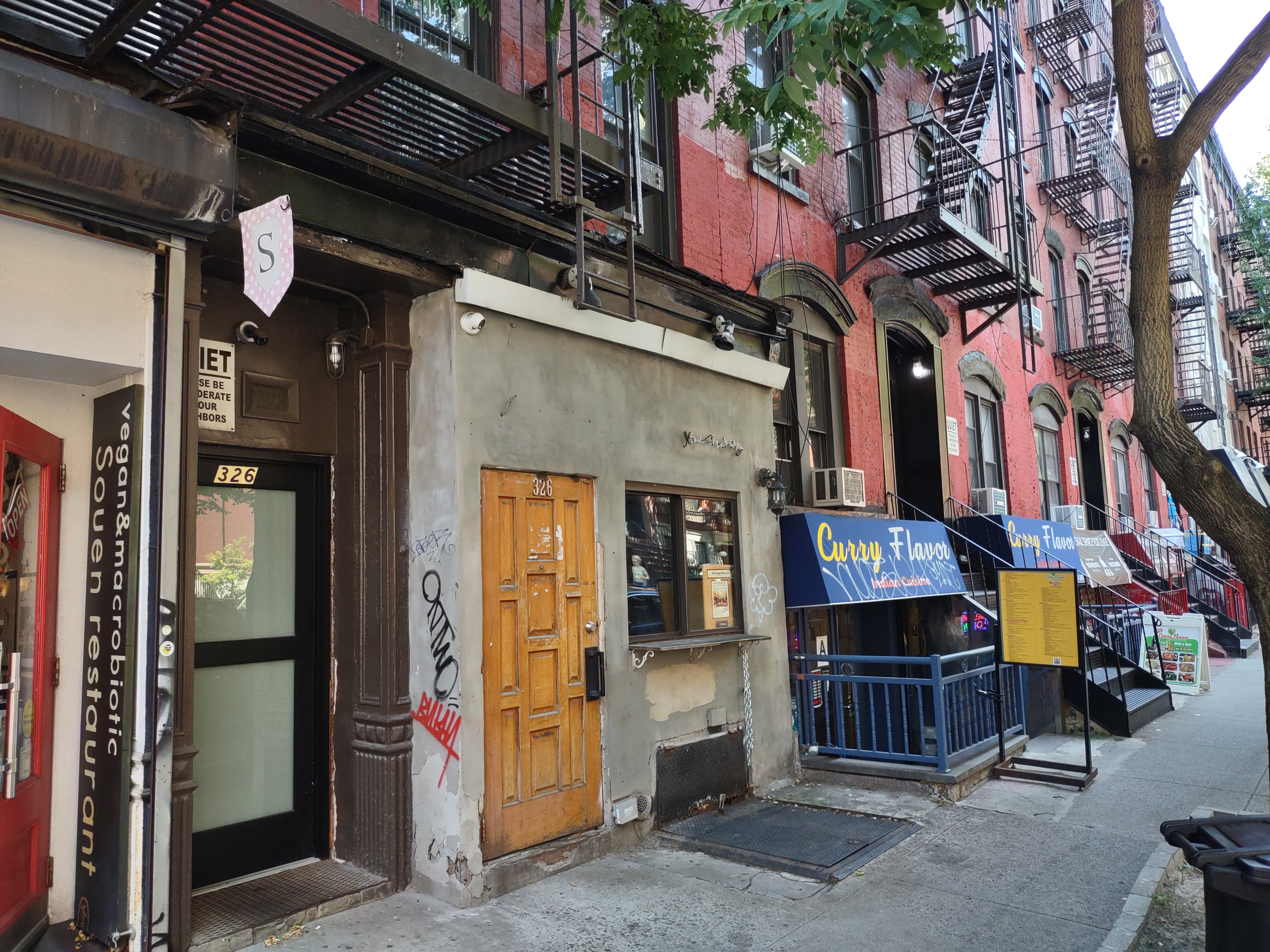
Curry Row, 2024

"Curry Row" or "Little India", sometimes called Curry Lane, is an area of East Sixth Street, from First Avenue to Second Avenue, in the East Village of Lower Manhattan, with approximately 20 Indian restaurants.

Curry Row started in 1968 when six brothers, all from Bangladesh, bought a former Japanese restaurant for $1,800; the owner of the property accepted that price instead of the initial $2,000 because the brothers could only pay $1,600. The brothers established the restaurant Shah Bag because of existing demand and because the area South Asians wanted a place where they could eat familiar cuisine. One of the brothers, Manir Ahmed, immigrated to the United States in 1954. Andrew Jacobs of The New York Times stated that "Manir Ahmed was the one name that was invariably stuffed in the pockets of new arrivals" and that the brothers "are revered as patriarchs in the Bangladeshi community".

Most of the restaurateurs that came to the area were from Sylhet Division. The restaurants, many named after films or people or characters seen in films, were popular with hippies in the 1970s who expressed an interest in South Asian culture. Many of the cooks served northern Indian cuisine even though their native Bangladeshi cuisine was significantly different. Olid Ahmed, the nephew of the first restaurateurs in Curry Row, stated that he got assistance from the chef of the Embassy of Pakistan. By the 1980s the restaurants became financially lucrative, and changes in immigration law meant there were more immigrants from Bangladesh. In 1984 there were about 10 South Asian restaurants. In the following decade that number was 27.

By 1996, The New York Times reported that several of the restaurants experienced financial issues as Indian restaurants opened in other parts of the New York metropolitan area. With increased competition, the newspaper reported that a "price war" resulted in relationships between people being damaged.

In 2008 there were around twelve Indian restaurants in the area.

In 2019 the South Asian-oriented publication The Juggernaut reported that some of the restaurants remained in operation while others had closed.

== See also ==
- Bangladeshi Americans § New York City
- Little India § New York, including the restaurant district "Curry Hill"
- Indians in the New York City metropolitan area
- List of numbered streets in Manhattan
- Oak Tree Road in Middlesex County, New Jersey, U.S.
