= Little India (Middlesex County, New Jersey) =

South Asian shopping district in Edison, New Jersey

Coordinates: 40.57393°N 74.32642°W

Oak Tree Road is a predominantly South Asian shopping, business, and dining district centered on a road designated County Route 604 in Middlesex County, in Central New Jersey. The commercial district, which is commonly known as India Square and also as Little India, is set amidst a suburban residential area that is home to many South Asian families. It runs through parts of Edison and Woodbridge Township.

== Location ==
Oak Tree Road runs for about one-and-a-half miles through Edison and neighboring Iselin, a section of Woodbridge Township. The epicenter of Little India retail is traditionally on the two-block stretch of Oak Tree Road between Correja Avenue and Middlesex Avenue in Iselin, an area officially known as India Square; there, as of 2017, rents were roughly double over the rest of the area. The intersection of Wood Avenue and Oak Tree Road is where the two towns meet. Some have lamented the "stroad" status of parts of the western portion of the road as inhibiting ideal walkability from establishment to establishment, and have advocated for improved sidewalks. In July 2026, Middlesex County received a $1.499 million grant through the New Jersey Department of Transportation's Transportation Alternatives Set-Aside program for pedestrian safety improvements along Oak Tree Road and County Road 604 in Edison and Woodbridge. The project was part of the county's Vision Zero Action Plan, which seeks to reduce traffic fatalities and serious injuries.

Middlesex, in Central Jersey, is the U.S. county with the highest concentration of Indian Americans. This area is the largest and most diverse South Asian ethnic enclave and cultural hub in the United States. According to the 2017 American Community Survey, 42.6% of Iselin residents identified themselves as being Asian Indian, the highest for any census-designated place in the United States.

== Culture, cuisine, and commerce ==
Oak Tree Road in Edison and Iselin is home to over 400 South Asian business establishments, including dining, halal grocery, jewelry, apparel and electronics retailing, and entertainment.

Many come to the area for its traditional gold and Maharashtrian jewelry retailers. In 2023, Tanishq, the luxury Indian jewelry brand, opened its U.S. flagship store on Oak Tree Road. Kalyan Jewellers opened in 2024

Indian-American supermarket chain Patel Brothers has several locations on the strip.

Over 145 Indian restaurants alone are found in the neighborhood. Establishments have appeared on food critics' "best of South Asian cuisine" national and regional lists. The district is also known as a destination for Indo-Chinese cuisine. Establishments range from vegetarian to non-vegetarian, South Indian to North Indian, and sweet to spicy. One food and entertainment critic has named the "atmospheric" Little India as one of the "50 Best Reasons to Live in New Jersey".

The actor-comedian Omi Vaidya celebrated the Oak Tree Road scene and South Asian culture in his 2020 song "Oak Tree Road," a parody of Old Town Road.

== History ==
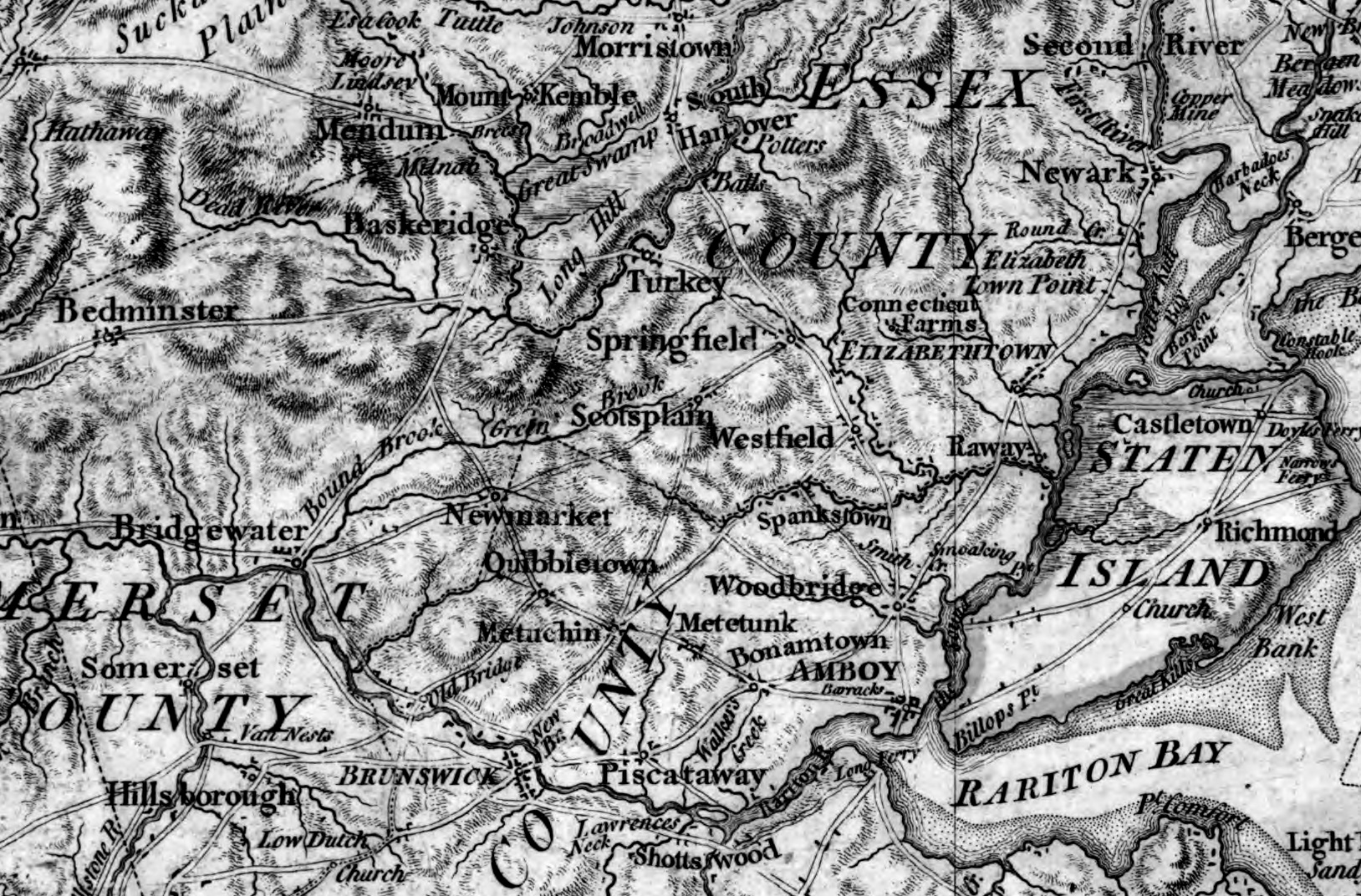
1777 map of the area where the Oak Tree Engagement took place. The greater battle occurred overall at points between "Metuchin" and Westfield. "Spanktown" is modern-day Rahway.

Oak Tree Road has a long history in commerce. It is named for a large oak tree which stood at a crossroads where a market was located during the Revolutionary War era. This crossroads and surrounding area was the site of the Oak Tree Engagement during the Battle of the Short Hills. It was a relatively rural area in the early to mid 20th century.

In the early 1990s, prior to the arrival of significant Indian investment, Oak Tree Road was a down-on-its-luck strip of biker bars and abandoned buildings. Some late-1980s-era economic pioneers to the then-rundown strip experienced racism from the locals, which largely subsided by the early 1990s.

In the 2024 PBS documentary, Destination: Oak Tree Road, Jaswant Singh, owner of Ashoka, shared his experiences of his restaurant business being targeted with eggs and baseball bats, and even having a week’s worth of onions destroyed in a break-in. Other business owners also endured similar attacks during that era, such as repeated vandalism of store signs. Groups of motorcycle bikers would frequently gather at a bar across from the businesses. Former New Jersey Governor Jim McGreevey, who served as mayor of Woodbridge during the 1990s, recalled complaints from Oak Tree Road business owners about harassment by these biker groups. In an interview in the aforementioned documentary, he stated that he intervened by talking to the bikers, emphasizing that vandalism and harassment would not be tolerated. The discussions helped subside the tension, although it took time to build a better relationship between the bikers, the local businesses, and the community.

The first Navratri festival in the state of New Jersey was held in the area in 1991. As Indian businesses began arriving in the 1990s en masse, the area transformed over time into the "thriving market full of pedestrian traffic on weekends" seen today.

By 2022, the Indian population was approaching one-third of the population of Monroe Township in southern Middlesex County, and the nickname Edison-South had developed, in reference to the Little India stature of both townships in Middlesex County.

== Festivals and events ==
A blend of South Asian religious festivals and cultural events are held in the Oak Tree Road district in Edison and Iselin, each featuring a melting pot of visitors and celebrants of all religions and backgrounds.

=== India Day Parade ===
The annual New Jersey India Day Parade, hosted by the Indian Business Association, is held every August on Oak Tree Road to celebrate Indian Independence Day. Celebrants such as Governor Phil Murphy start in Edison at Cinder Road and march eastbound towards Iselin, finishing the parade at India Square in Iselin. In 2022 as in other years, local officials attended, including Speaker Craig Coughlin, U.S. congressman Frank Pallone, New Jersey state senator Patrick J. Diegnan, Assemblyman Robert Karabinchak, Mayor John McCormac, and Edison mayor Sam Joshi.

==== Celebrity parade guests ====
Celebrities from Hindi and Telugu cinema are typically invited to the parade on Oak Tree Road. Attendees and parade marshals have included Tamannaah Bhatia, Kajal Aggarwal, Sonu Sood, RJ Devaki, Monal Gajjar, Richa Anirudh, Avani Modi, Prachee Shah, Madalsa Sherma, Sameksha Singh, Esha Deol, Sanya Malhotra, Anupam Kher, and Sujata Mehta.

==== 2022 parade float controversy ====
In 2022, controversy and concerns about anti-Muslim animus arose at the annual parade when members of the community objected to a yellow wheel loader, resembling a bulldozer, seen in the August 14 parade displaying photographs of Prime Minister Modi and the conservative Hindu nationalist monk, Yogi Adityanath, who is also the chief elected leader of the Northern Indian region of Uttar Pradesh. Modi and Adityanath are both members of the right-leaning Bharatiya Janata Party, a major Indian political party. The 2022 Oak Tree Road parade's grand marshal, Sambit Patra, is the national spokesperson for the same party. The yellow construction vehicle displayed at the 2022 parade included a placard with the words "Baba ka bulldozer" written in Hindi. This display was a reference to the monk's nickname, both affectionately and pejoratively, of "Bulldozer Baba" (roughly equivalent to "Father Bulldozer," "Saint Bulldozer" or "Bulldozer Monk") for his extensive use of the machine in demolishing structures. Ultimately, the parade organizers apologized for the parade display. The Middlesex County Prosecutor's Office characterized the display as a "bias incident," although no probable cause existed to press criminal charges of bias intimidation.

==== 2023 Bajrang Dal flags at parade ====
During the 2023 parade, reports arose of anti-Muslim intimidation by a group of young men waving the militant Hindu nationalist Bajrang Dal flags and chanting, concerning Indian Muslim parade-marcher witnesses.

=== Other festivals and events ===
- Ganesh Utsav. Every year the weeklong festival honoring the Hindu deity Ganesha draws thousands of celebrants to nearby Woodbridge Mall.
- Diwali. Celebrations for Diwali, the Hindu festival of lights, are held annually on Oak Tree Road and surroundings.
- Holi, the Hindu festival of colors, is also celebrated with the use of color and dancing at events on Oak Tree Road.
- Eid. Visitors and the Desi Muslims in the Oak Tree Road area celebrate the Eid religious festivals twice a year with feasts and celebrations: Eid al-Fitr at the end of Ramadan and Eid al-Adha later in the year.
- Christmas. The Indian Business Association sponsors a Christmas tree lighting and celebratory festival with Santa Claus annually.
- Navratri. A large Navratri festival is held annually in the area, in most recent years at the NJ Expo Center at Raritan Center. Jack Ciattarelli attended in 2021.
- The New Jersey Indian and International Film Festival is held annually.

== Houses of worship ==
A variety of Hindu temples have been established along the strip, alongside diverse Christian, Jewish, and Muslim congregations in the greater area. Shirdi Sai Cultural and Community Center is one such temple. Located on the Iselin side of the district, it is devoted to the 19th century Indian saint Sai Baba of Shirdi.

== See also ==
- Chinese community of Edison, NJ
- Curry Hill in Midtown Manhattan
- Curry Row in Lower Manhattan
- Ethnoburb
- List of neighborhoods in Edison, New Jersey
- List of neighborhoods in Woodbridge Township, New Jersey
- List of county routes in Middlesex County, New Jersey
- India Independence Day Parade
- Indians in the New York City metropolitan region
- India Square in Jersey City, New Jersey
- The Dotbusters, an anti-Indian violent hate group in 1980s and early 1990s, mainly in Jersey City, New Jersey.
- Overseas Indians
- Swaminarayan Akshardham in Robbinsville, New Jersey (the world's second-largest Hindu temple and the largest outside Asia).
- New Jersey-India Commission, a state commission created in 2024 to enhance New Jersey-India trade.
- New Jersey India Center, formed by the state of New Jersey in 2019 as an economic contact point for Indian businesses interested in bringing business to the state.
