= Dotbusters =

Hate group based in Jersey City, USA

- Founding location: New Jersey City, New Jersey
- Years active: 1975–1993
- Territory: New Jersey, New York
- Criminal activities: assault, hate crime

The Dotbusters was a hate group active in Jersey City, New Jersey, United States, from 1975 to 1993 that attacked and threatened South Asian Americans in the fall of 1975. The term "dot" in "Dotbusters" originates from the bindi, a traditional forehead mark worn by a number of women from various South Asian countries.

== Background ==
A Bindi is a coloured dot or a sticker worn in the center of the forehead, mostly by women from Dharmic communities like Hindus, Sikhs, Buddhists, and Jains.

== History ==
In July 1987, they had a letter published in The Jersey Journal stating that they would take any means necessary to drive the Indians out of Jersey City:

"I'm writing about your article during July about the abuse of Indian People. Well I'm here to state the other side. I hate them, if you had to live near them you would also. We are an organization called the Dotbusters. We have been around for 2 [sic] years. We will go to any extreme to get Indians to move out of Jersey City. If I'm walking down the street and I see a Hindu and the setting is right, I will hit him or her. We plan some of our most extreme attacks such as breaking windows, breaking car windows, and crashing family parties. We use the phone books and look up the name Patel. Have you seen how many of them there are? Do you even live in Jersey City? Do you walk down Central avenue and experience what its [sic] like to be near them: we have and we just don't want it anymore. You said that they will have to start protecting themselves because the police cannot always be there. They will never do anything. They are a weak race Physically [sic] and mentally. We are going to continue our way. We will never be stopped."

Multiple racial incidents from vandalism to assault followed. Later that month, a group of youths attacked Navroze Mody, an Indian Parsi (Zoroastrian) man after he had left the Gold Coast Café with his friend. Mody fell into a coma and died four days later. The four convicted of the attack were Luis Acevedo, Ralph Gonzalez and Luis Padilla, who were convicted of aggravated assault; and William Acevedo, who was convicted of simple assault. The attack was with fists and feet and with an unknown object that was described as either a baseball bat or a brick, and occurred after members of the group, which was estimated as being between ten and twelve youths, had surrounded Mody and taunted him for his baldness as either "Kojak" or "Baldie". Mody's father, Jamshid Mody, later brought charges against the city and police force of Hoboken, New Jersey, claiming that "the Hoboken police's indifference to acts of violence perpetrated against Indian Americans violated Navroze Mody's equal protection rights" under the Fourteenth Amendment. Mody lost the case; the court ruled that the attack had not been proven a hate crime, nor had there been proven any malfeasance by the police or prosecutors of the city.

A few days after the attack on Mody, another Indian was beaten into a coma; this time on a busy street corner in Jersey City Heights. The victim, Kaushal Saran, was found unconscious at Central and Ferry Avenues, near a city park and firehouse, according to police reports. Saran, a licensed physician in India who was awaiting licensing in the United States, was discharged later from University Hospital in Newark. The unprovoked attack left Saran in a partial coma for over a week with severe damage to his skull and brain. In September 1992, Thomas Kozak, Martin Ricciardi, and Mark Evangelista were brought to trial on federal civil rights charges in connection with the attack on Saran. However, the three were acquitted of the charges in two separate trials in 1993. Saran testified at both trials that he could not remember the incident.

The Dotbusters were primarily based in New York and New Jersey and committed most of their crimes in Jersey City. Multiple young men and women were attacked and harassed near Central Avenue in the Jersey City Heights area during the period of 1975–1993 by the group whom some say was based out of a Hopkins Avenue, Jersey City, home. Details are somewhat clouded on whom and what the gang actually went after, but a number of accounts of homes being burglarized and men being attacked in the middle of night have been recorded. Up until 1989, it seemed like a one-way battle until small groups of Indians began to fight back physically all over the state and outlying boroughs of New York City. A number of perpetrators have been brought to trial for these assaults. Although tougher anti-hate crime laws were passed by the New Jersey Legislature in 1990, the attacks continued, with 58 cases of hate crimes against Indians in New Jersey reported in 1991.

These incidents were a severe blow to the Indian immigrant community and jarred it into taking serious political action. While the violence seemed to be aimed at the Hindu community, where the wearing of the Bindi is most common, it is believed that the Dotbusters' actions were based on racial grounds, aimed indiscriminately at Hindu immigrants. A Columbia University–based group called Indian Youth Against Racism (later simply Youth Against Racism) documented instances of violence against Indians in New Jersey and helped implement a series of educational programs on South Asian cultures for students and faculty at a Jersey City high school. The group also helped get a bill passed in the New Jersey Legislature that raised the mandatory penalties for "bias crimes."

The gang's activities were spotlighted again in June 2010, when a column by Time magazine contributor Joel Stein titled "My Own Private India" made light of the use of a related epithet, "dot heads", in nearby Edison in the 1980s. The New Jersey-raised philosopher Falguni A. Sheth mentioned her mother's harassment by "Dotbusters", and subsequent indifference of the New Jersey State Police (NJSP), in an interview with The New York Times.

== See also ==
- Anti-Hindu sentiment
- Anti-Indian sentiment
- Oak Tree Road
