= Little India (disambiguation) =

Little India is a common name for an ethnic enclave of Indian expatriates abroad.

Little India may also refer to:

== Media ==
- Little India (magazine), periodical started in 1991

== Places ==
While most "Little India" enclaves have different names, a few are specifically named as so:

Australia

- A portion of Harris Park in Sydney

Canada

- Gerrard India Bazaar, also known as Little India

Malaysia

- Little India, Ipoh
- Little India, Malacca
- Little India, Penang

Singapore

- Little India, Singapore

United States

- Little India, Artesia, California
- Little India, Edison/Iselin
- Little India (Houston)

== See also ==
- Asiatown (disambiguation)
