= Asiatown =

Asiatown could refer to:

- Cebu IT Park, in the Philippines, is known as "Asiatown"
- Asiatown, Cleveland, an ethnic enclave in Cleveland, Ohio, U.S.
- Asia District, Oklahoma City
- Asian Town, a commercial complex in the Industrial Area district of Doha, Qatar
  - Asian Town Cricket Stadium

== See also ==
Asiatown could also be a generalization of Asian ethnic enclaves outside of Asia, more specific to a particular Asian culture.

- Chinatown (disambiguation), an Asian ethnic enclave of Chinese people outside of China, Taiwan, Hong Kong and Macao
- Koreatown (disambiguation), an Asian ethnic enclave of Korean people outside of North and South Korea
- Little Saigon, an Asian ethnic enclave of Vietnamese people outside of Vietnam
- Little Tokyo (disambiguation) or Japantown, an Asian ethnic enclave of Japanese people outside Japan
- Little India (disambiguation), an Asian ethnic enclave of Indian people outside of India
- Thai Town (disambiguation), an Asian ethnic enclave of Thai people outside of Thailand
