= Little India =

Indian enclave outside India

Other official languages:
- - Assamese: ভাৰতীয় প্ৰব্ৰজনকাৰী
  - Bengali: ভারতীয় প্রবাসী
  - Bodo: भारतीय प्रवासी
  - Dogri: भारतीय प्रवासी
  - Gujarati: ભારતીય પ્રવાસી
  - Hindi: भारतीय प्रवासी
  - Kannada: ಭಾರತೀಯ ವಲಸೆಗಾರರು
  - Kashmiri: بھارتی نازک
  - Konkani: भारतीय प्रवासी लोक
  - Maithili: भारतीय प्रवासी
  - Malayalam: ഇന്ത്യൻ പ്രവാസികൾ
  - Marathi: भारतीय डायस्पोरा
  - Meitei: ঈন্দিঅ গি মাযাঙ লেইবাক্
  - Nepali: भारतीय प्रवासी
  - Odia: ଭାରତୀୟ ପ୍ରବାସୀ
  - Punjabi: ਭਾਰਤੀ ਡਾਇਸਪੋਰਾ
  - Sanskrit: भारतीय प्रवासी
  - Santali: ᱵᱷᱟᱨᱚᱛᱤᱭᱟᱹ ᱰᱟᱭᱥᱯᱳᱨᱟ
  - Sindhi: هندستاني ڊاسپورا
  - Tamil: இந்திய புலம்பெயர்ந்தோர்
  - Telugu: భారతీయ డయాస్పోరా
  - Urdu: ہندوستانی ڈائاسپورا
- Neighbourhoods
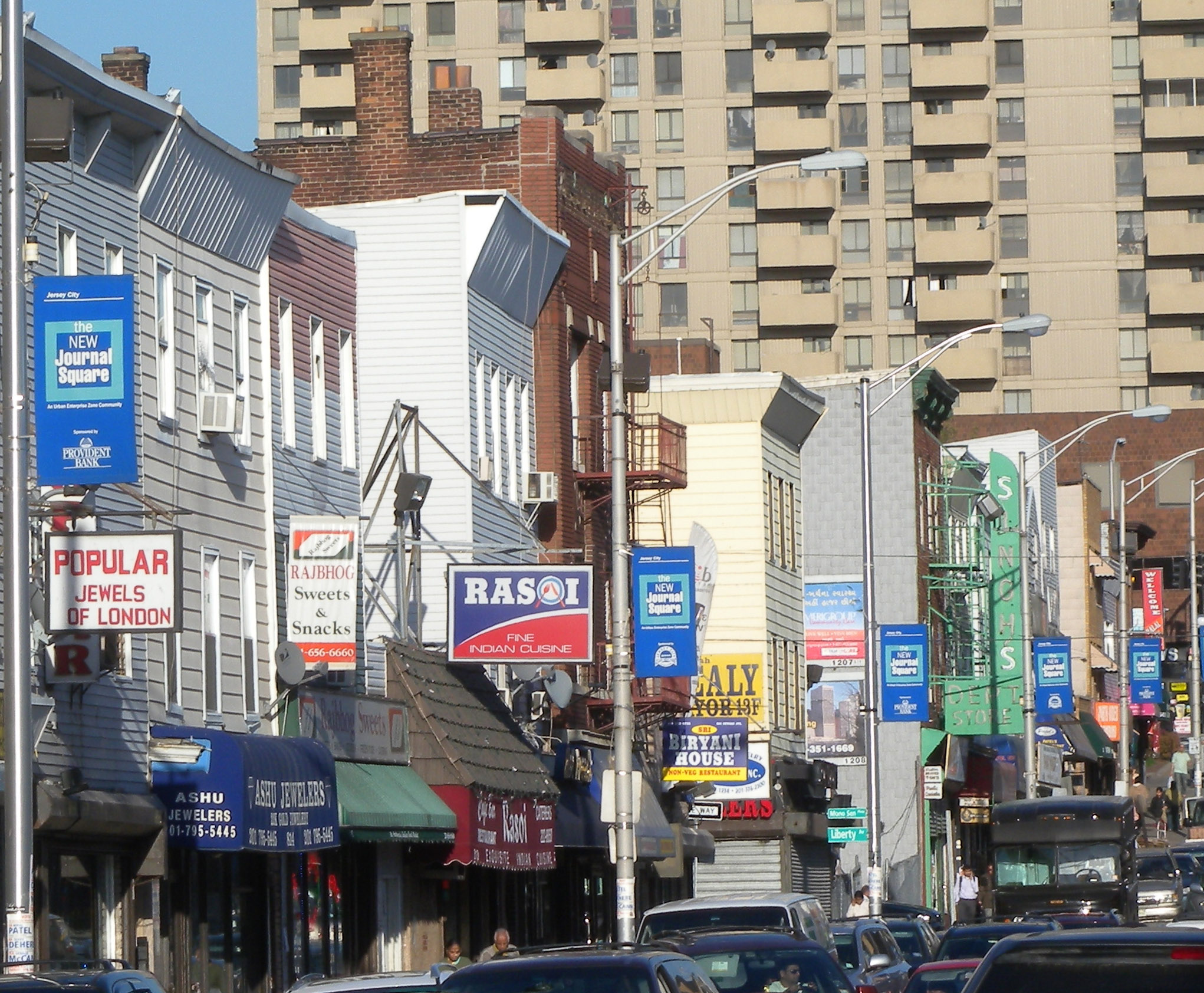
- India Square, Jersey City, New Jersey

- Flag

- The Indian diaspora

Little India (also known as Indian Street, India Bazaar, or India Town) is an Indian or South Asian sociocultural environment outside India or the Indian subcontinent. It especially refers to an area with a significant concentration of South Asian residents and a diverse collection of Indian businesses. Frequently, Little Indias have Hindu temples, mosques, and gurdwaras. They may also host celebrations of national and religious festivals and serve as gathering places for South Asians. As such, they are microcosms of India. Little Indias are often tourist attractions and are frequented by fans of Indian cuisine, Indian culture, Indian clothing, Indian music, and Indian cinema.

== North America ==
=== Canada ===
==== Alberta ====
- Plaza 34 at 34 Avenue and 92 Street, Edmonton

==== British Columbia ====
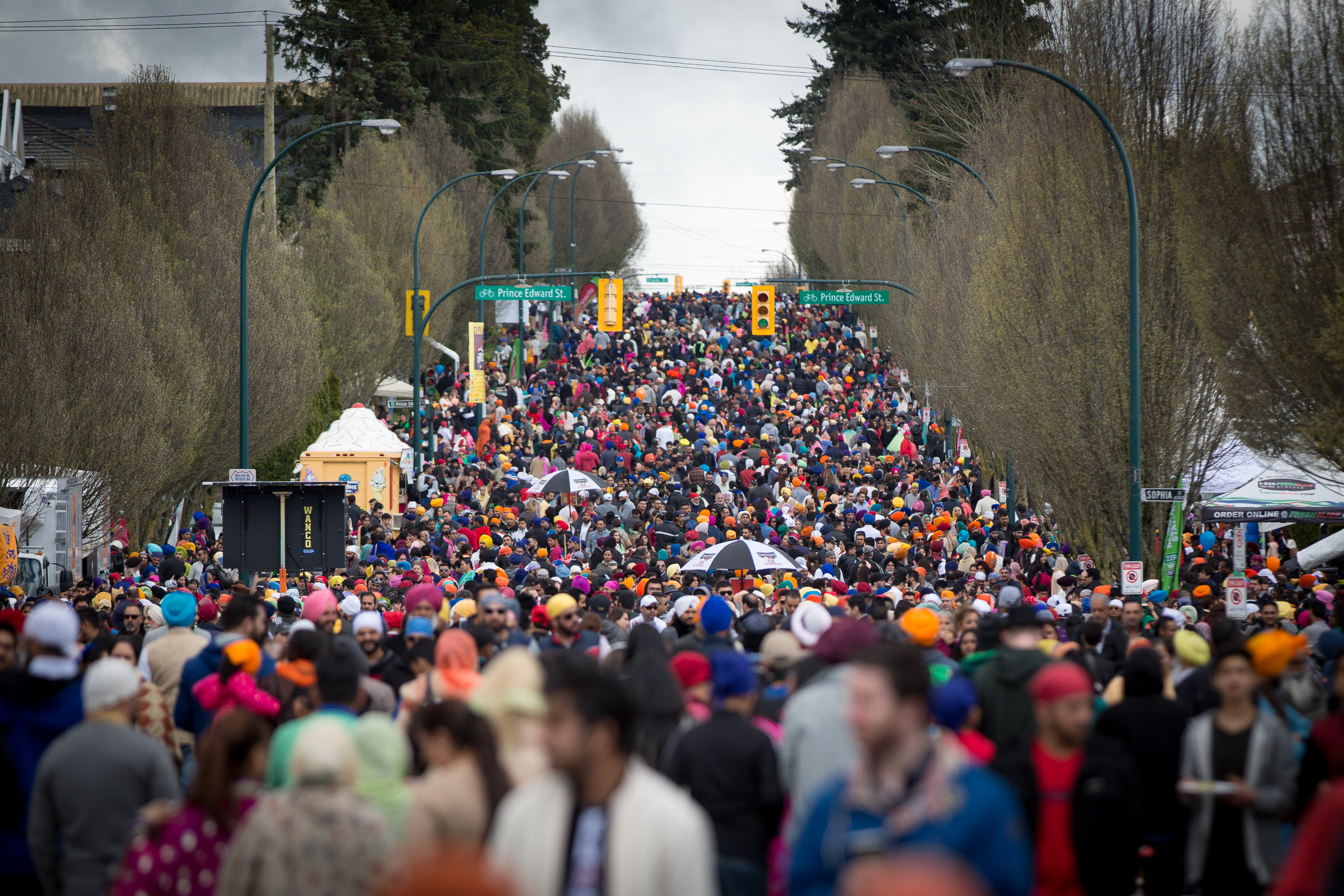
Vaisakhi Parade at Punjabi Market in Vancouver, 2017

- Metro Vancouver
  - Little India, Newton, Surrey
  - Punjabi Market, the oldest Little India in North America

==== Manitoba ====
- Mandalay Drive, Winnipeg

==== Ontario ====
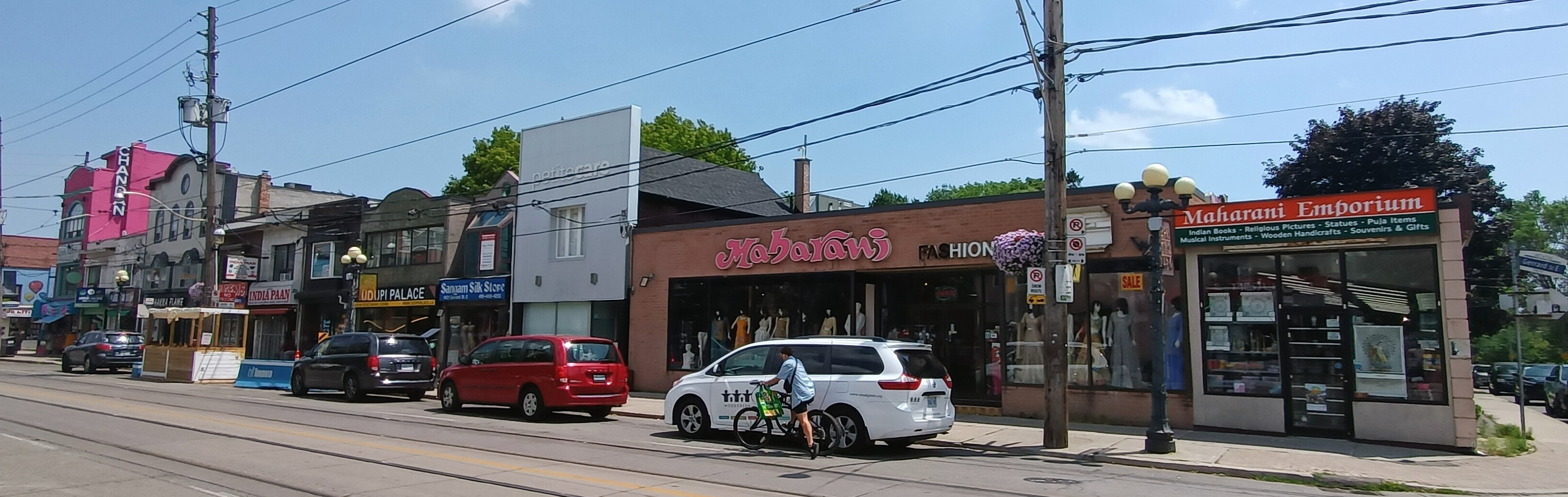
Gerrard India Bazaar in Toronto

- Brampton
- Gerrard India Bazaar, Greater Toronto Area
- Argyle, London

==== Quebec ====
- Park Extension, Montreal

=== United States ===
==== Arizona ====
- India Plaza, East Apache Boulevard, Tempe

==== California ====
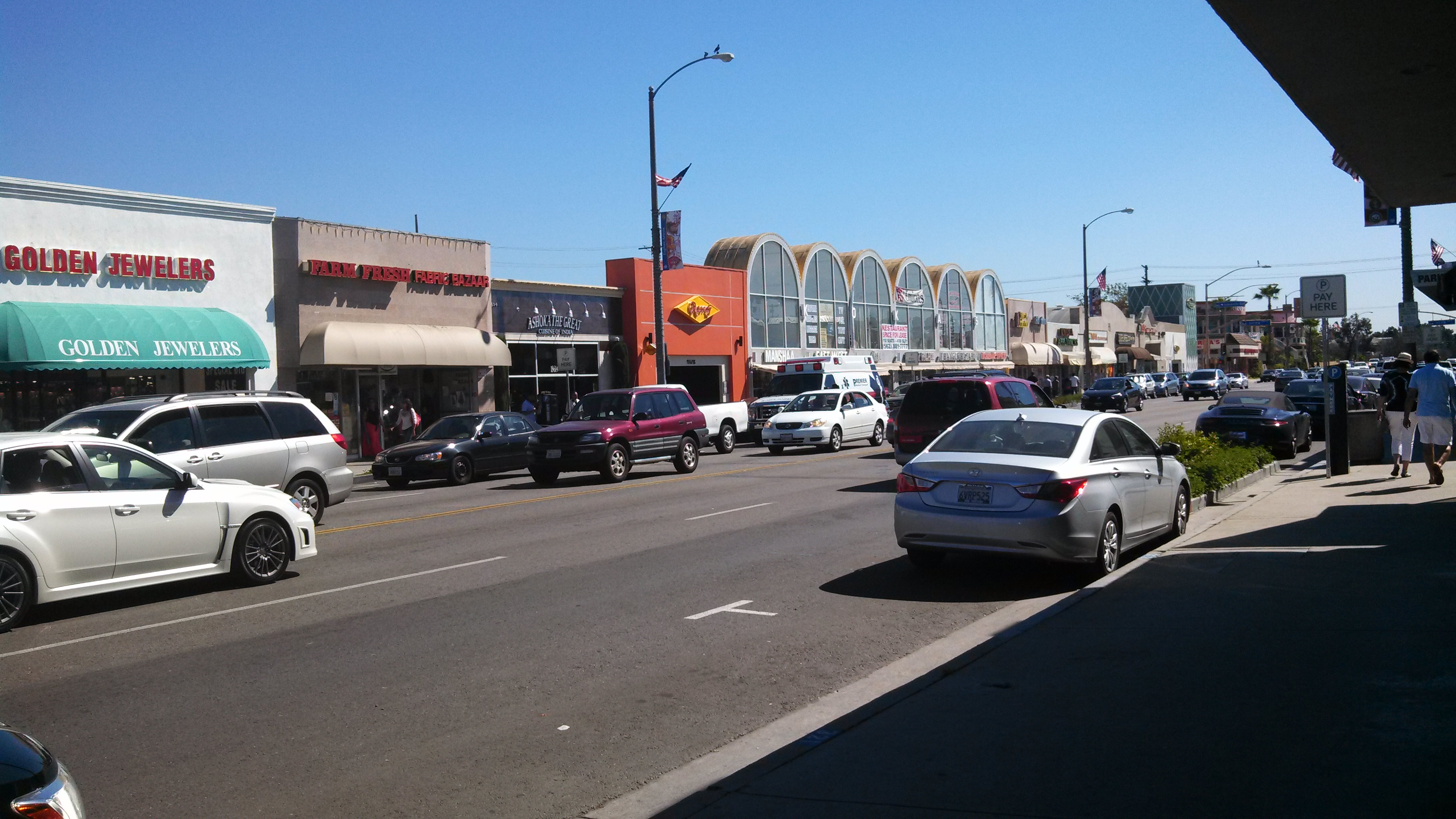
Little India in Artesia, California

- Little India, Artesia
- Venice Boulevard, Los Angeles
- Black Mountain Road, San Diego
- San Francisco Bay Area
  - Fremont
  - El Camino Real, Sunnyvale
  - Santa Clara
  - University Avenue, Berkeley

==== Florida ====
- Baymeadows Road, Jacksonville
- South Orange Blossom Trail, Orlando
- East Fowler Avenue, Tampa
- Oakland Park Boulevard, Sunrise

==== Georgia ====
- Global Mall, Jimmy Carter Boulevard, Norcross
- Lawrenceville Highway, Decatur

==== Illinois ====
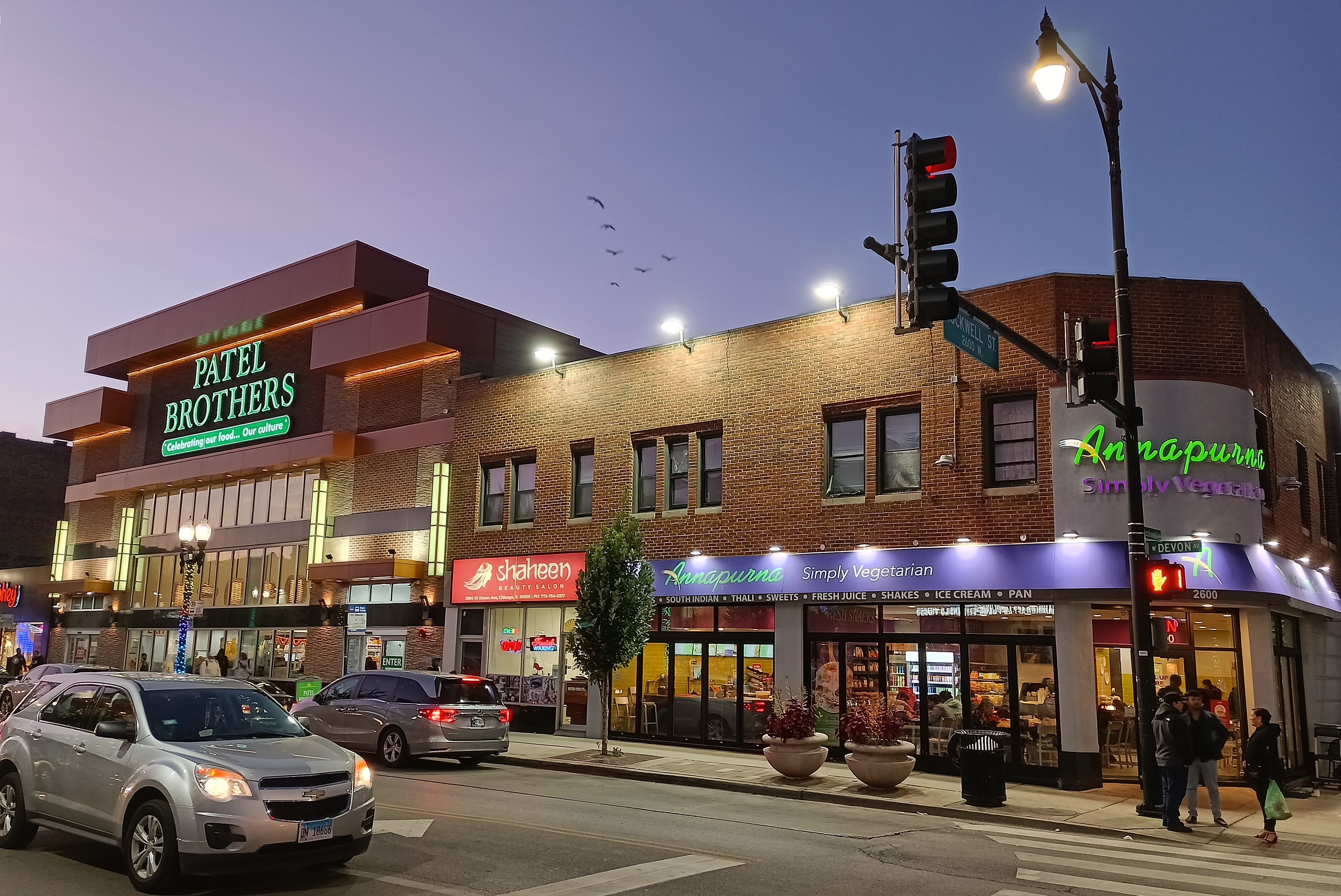
Chicago's Little India on Devon Avenue

- Devon Avenue, Chicago
- East Schaumburg Road, Schaumburg
- Mall of India, Illinois Route 59, Naperville
- Ogden Avenue, Naperville

==== Maryland ====
- New Hampshire Avenue, Takoma Park

==== Massachusetts ====
- Moody Street, Waltham
- Route 9, Shrewsbury, Westborough, Grafton
- Cambridge St, Burlington

==== New Jersey ====
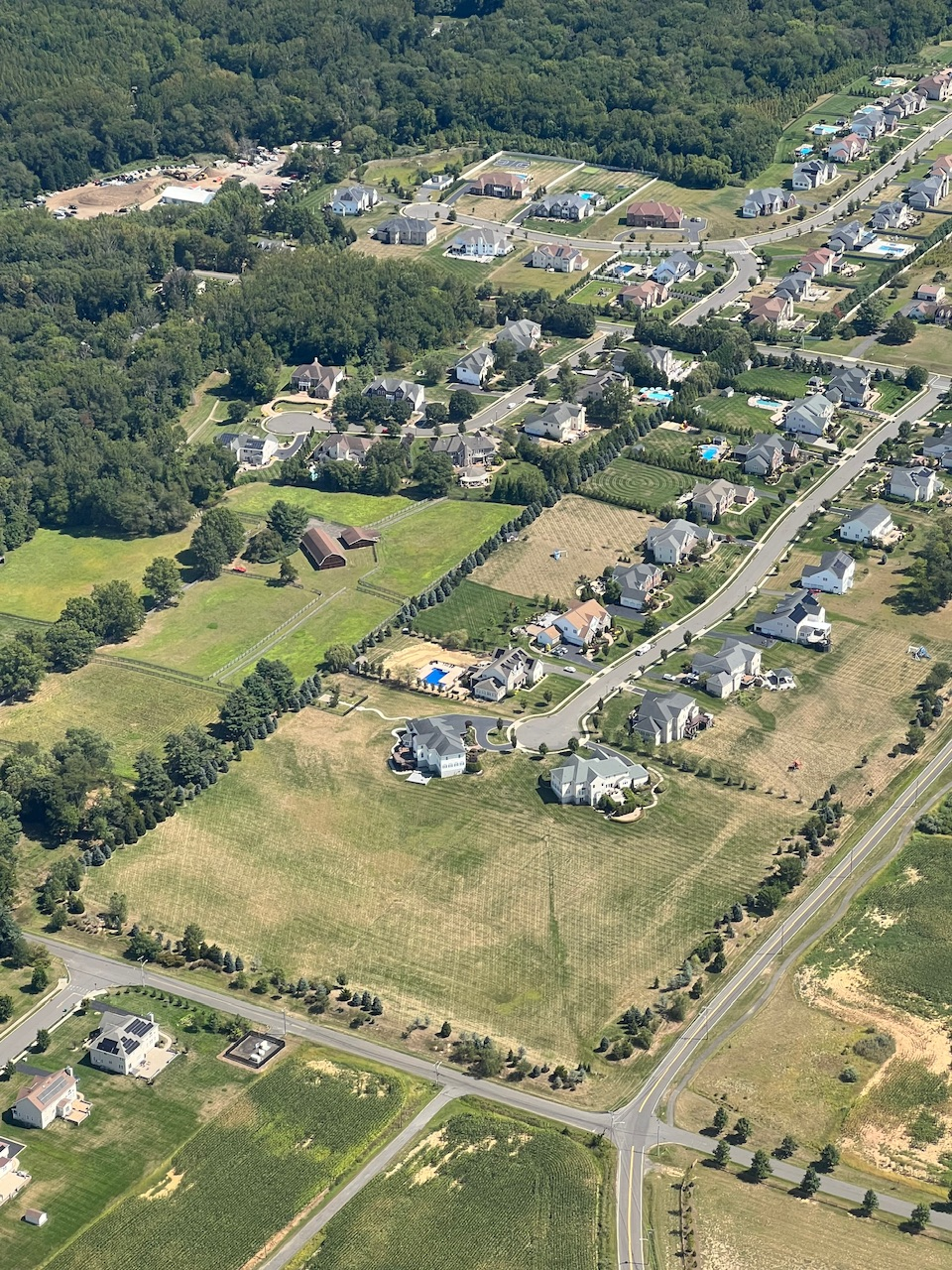
Aerial view of suburban Monroe Township, Middlesex County, New Jersey housing tracts in 2025, with majority-Indian populations

Monroe Township, and Middlesex County in Central New Jersey, are home to by far the highest per capita Indian American populations of any U.S. state and U.S. county, respectively, at 3.9% and 14.1%, by 2013 U.S. Census estimates.

- Carteret – 13.6%(2012)
- Cranbury CDP – 11.5%(2012)
- Cranbury Township – 10.5%(2012)
- East Windsor – 16.6%
- Edison – 36.2%
- Franklin – 14.6%(2012)
- Fords – 11.1%(2012)
- Iselin – 45.1%
- Monroe Township, New Jersey – 11.6% (2016) By 2022, the Indian population was approaching one-third of Monroe Township's population.
- North Brunswick – 16.5%
- Parsippany – 24.8%
- Piscataway – 18.3%
- Plainsboro – 44.7%
- Robbinsville CDP – 15.7%(2012)
- Secaucus – 22.9%
- South Brunswick – 36.3%
- West Windsor – 33.8%
- Woodbridge – 16.7%

===== India Square =====
India Square, also known as Little Gujarat, is a commercial and restaurant district in Bombay, on Newark Avenue, in Jersey City, Hudson County, New Jersey. The area is home to the highest concentration of Asian Indians in the Western Hemisphere, and is a rapidly growing Indian American ethnic enclave within the New York metropolitan area. The neighborhood is centered on Newark Avenue, between Tonnele Avenue and JFK Boulevard, and is considered to be part of the larger Journal Square District. This area has been home to the largest outdoor Navratri festivities in New Jersey as well as several Hindu temples. This portion of Newark Avenue is lined with groceries including Patel Brothers and Subzi Mandi Cash & Carry, electronics vendors, video stores, clothing stores, and restaurants and is one of the busier pedestrian areas of this part of the city, often stopping traffic for hours.

===== Oak Tree Road (Edison/Iselin) =====
Oak Tree Road is a rapidly growing South Asian-focused commercial strip in Middlesex County, New Jersey, also known as the Indian Times Square and India Square, in addition to Little India. The Oak Tree Road strip runs for about one-and-a-half miles through Edison and neighboring Iselin, New Jersey, near the area's sprawling Chinatown and Koreatown. Little India in Edison and Iselin is the largest and most diverse South Asian cultural hub in the United States. The zone is home to approximately 400 South Asian establishments and businesses, including dining, apparel and electronics retailing, and entertainment. Around 60 Indian and Pakistani restaurants are found in the area. In Middlesex County, election ballots are printed in Gujarati, Hindi, and Punjabi as well.

==== New York ====
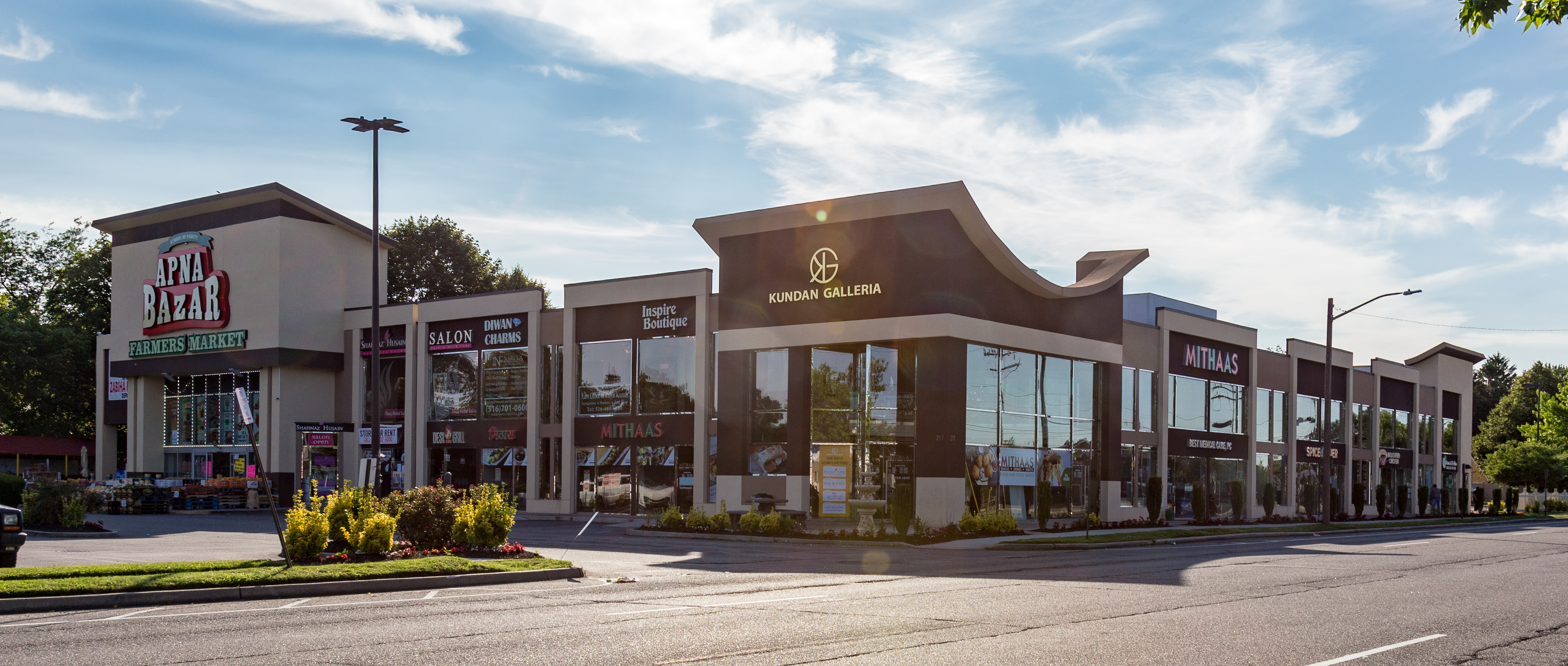
A South Asian shopping center in Hicksville, Nassau County, New York, on Long Island

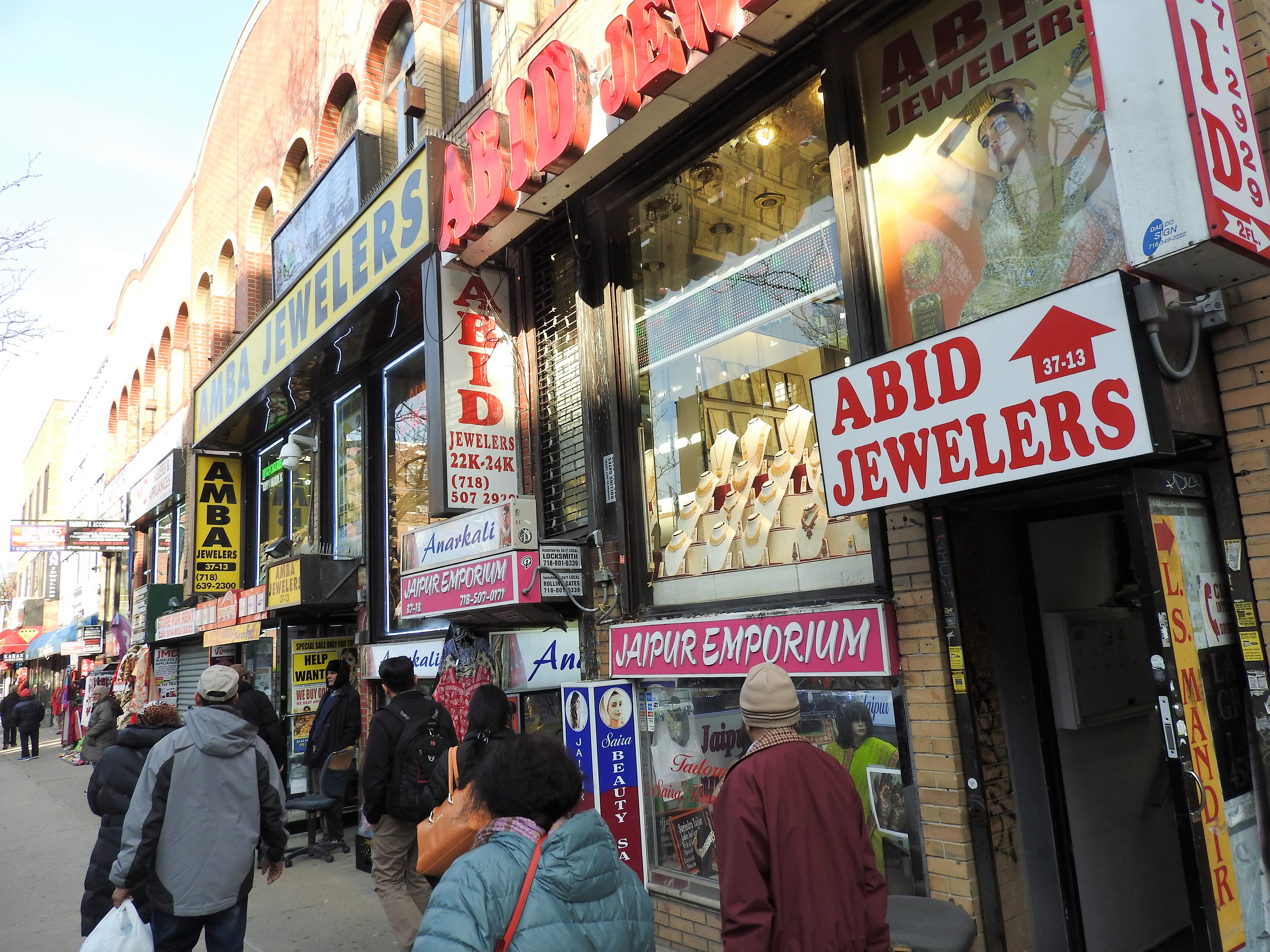
Little India on 74th Street in Jackson Heights, Queens

- Capital District
  - Menands
- Long Island
  - Central Broadway, Hicksville
- New York City
  - Manhattan
    - Lexington Avenue, in the neighborhood of Rose Hill, between 27th and 29th streets (growing preponderance of South Indian cuisine), has become known as Curry Hill as a result of the presence of old Kalustyan's spice shop.
    - East 6th Street, between 1st and 2nd avenues, was known as Curry Row. However, that label has faded, and as of 2024 only one South Asian storefront remains.
  - Queens
    - Hillside Avenue, Floral Park
    - 74th Street, Jackson Heights
    - Liberty Avenue, Richmond Hill
- Western New York
  - 3rd Street, Niagara Falls

==== North Carolina ====
- Charlotte area
  - Pineville-Matthews Road, Pineville
- Raleigh–Durham–Chapel Hill area
  - East Chatham Street, Cary
  - Morrisville

==== Ohio ====
- Sancus Boulevard, Columbus

==== Pennsylvania ====
- Millbourne/Upper Darby

==== Texas ====
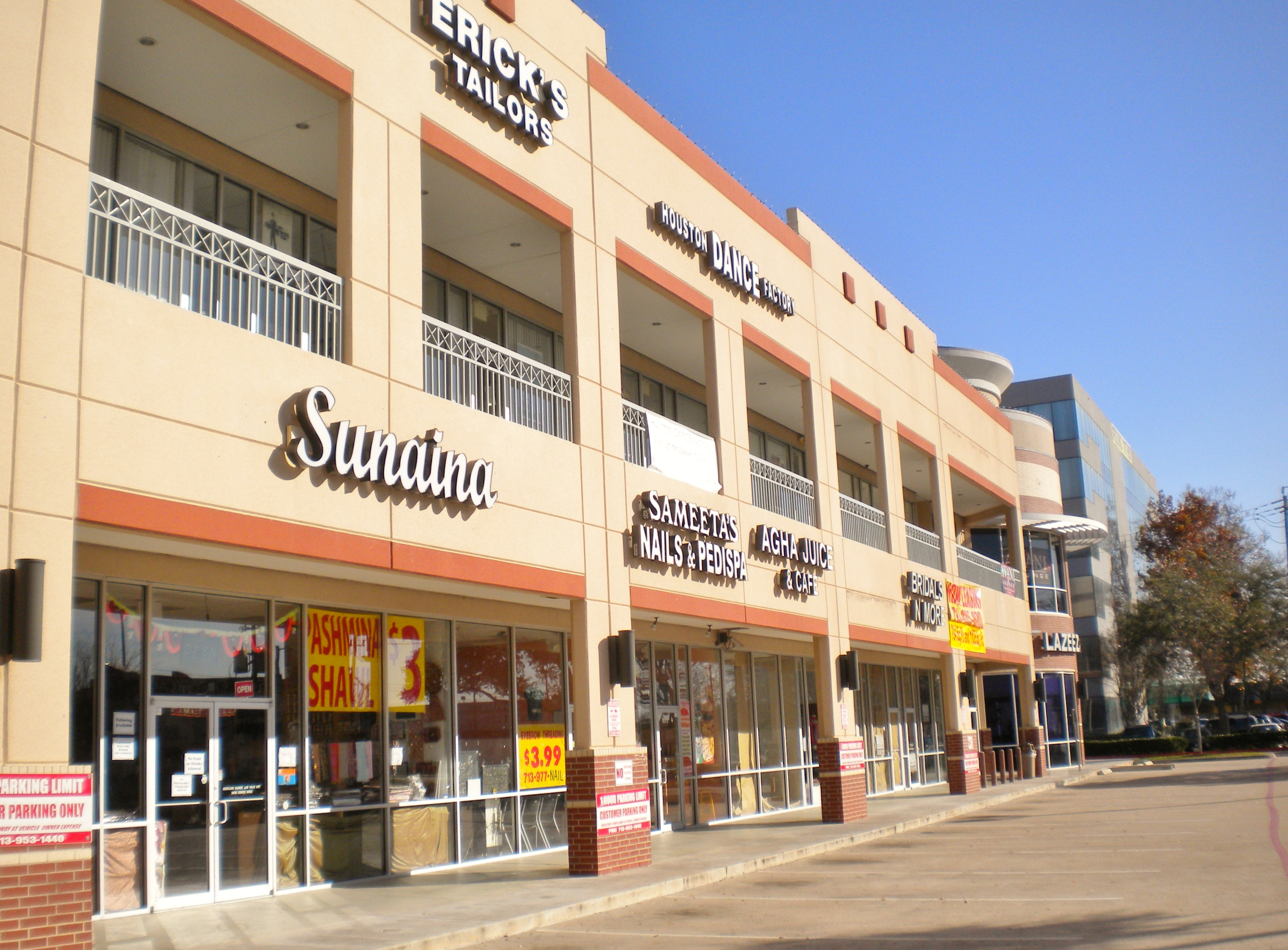
Mahatma Gandhi District in Houston

- Belt Line Road, Richardson
- Irving
- Mahatma Gandhi District, Houston
- Eldorado Parkway, Frisco
- Evers, Fredericksburg, and Wurzbach Roads near University of Texas Health Science Center, San Antonio

== Africa ==
=== Mauritius ===
Source:

=== South Africa ===
- Sparks and Brickfields Roads, Overport, Durban
- Fordsburg, Johannesburg

== Asia ==
=== Bahrain ===
- Bab Al Bahrain Avenue, Manama Souq, Manama

=== Hong Kong ===
- Chungking Mansions

=== Indonesia ===
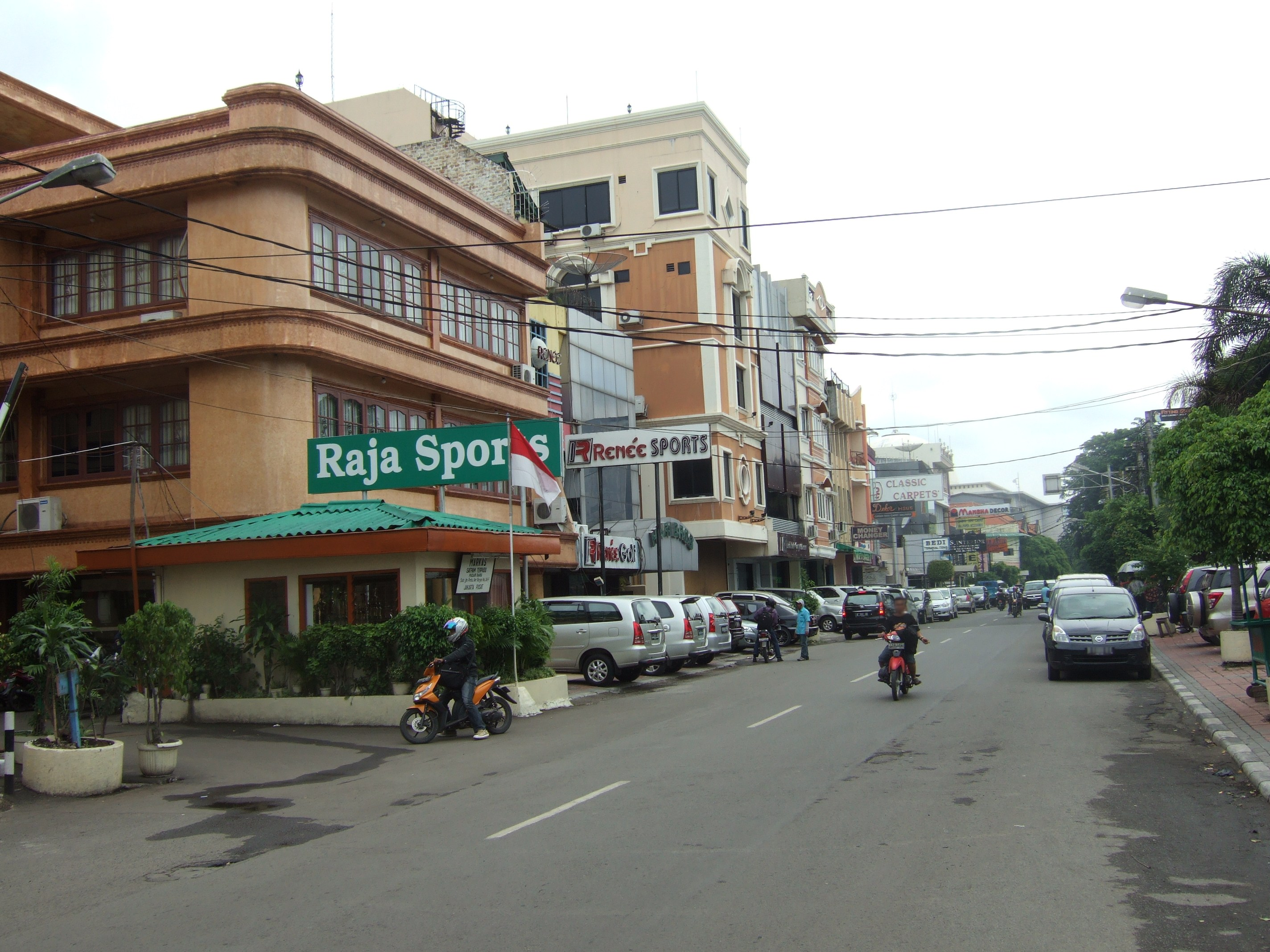
Pasar Baru, Jakarta

- Pasar Baru, Jakarta
- Kampung Madras, Medan

=== Israel ===
- Dimona

=== Japan ===
- Nishi-Kasai, Edogawa, Tokyo

=== Malaysia ===
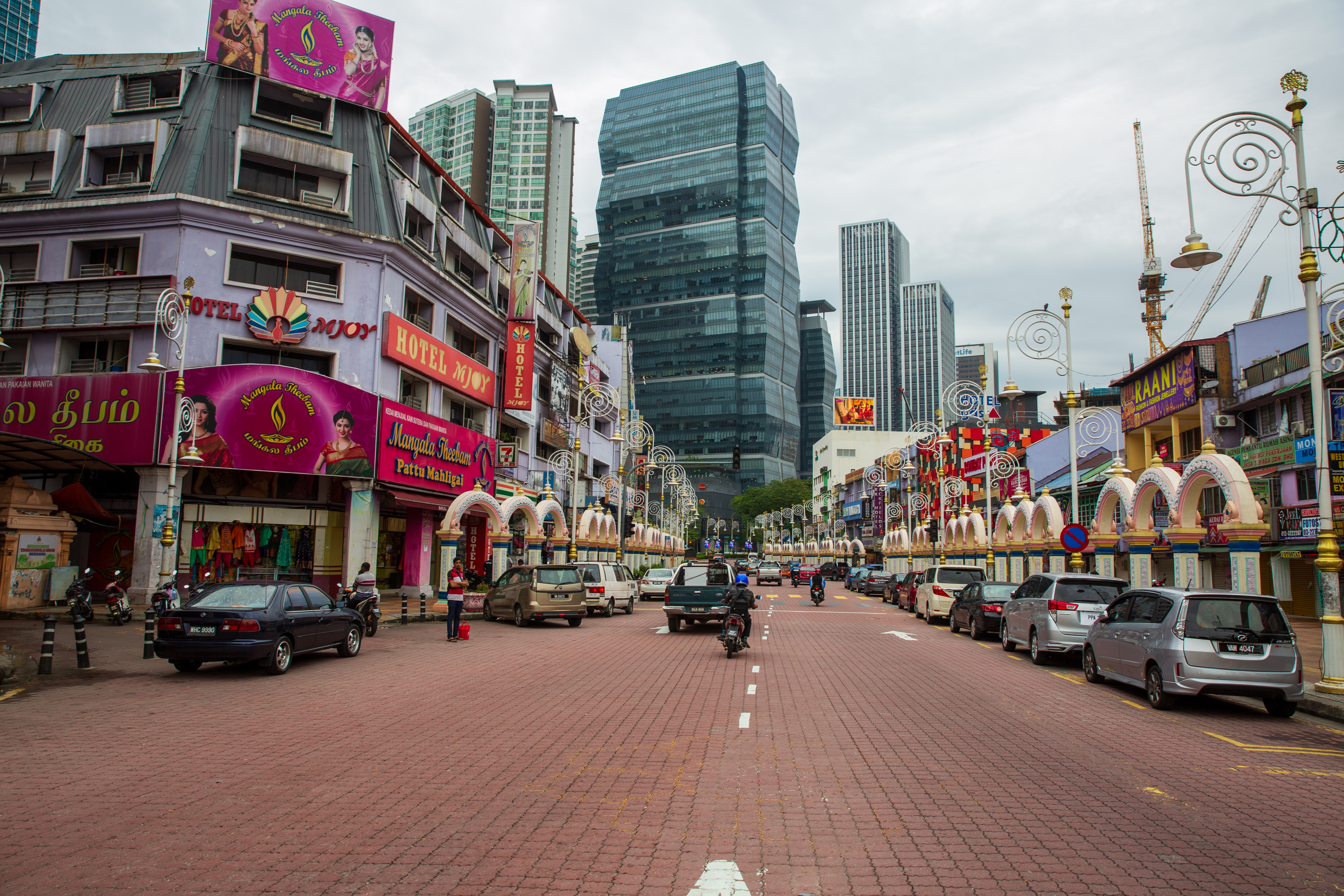
Brickfields, Kuala Lumpur

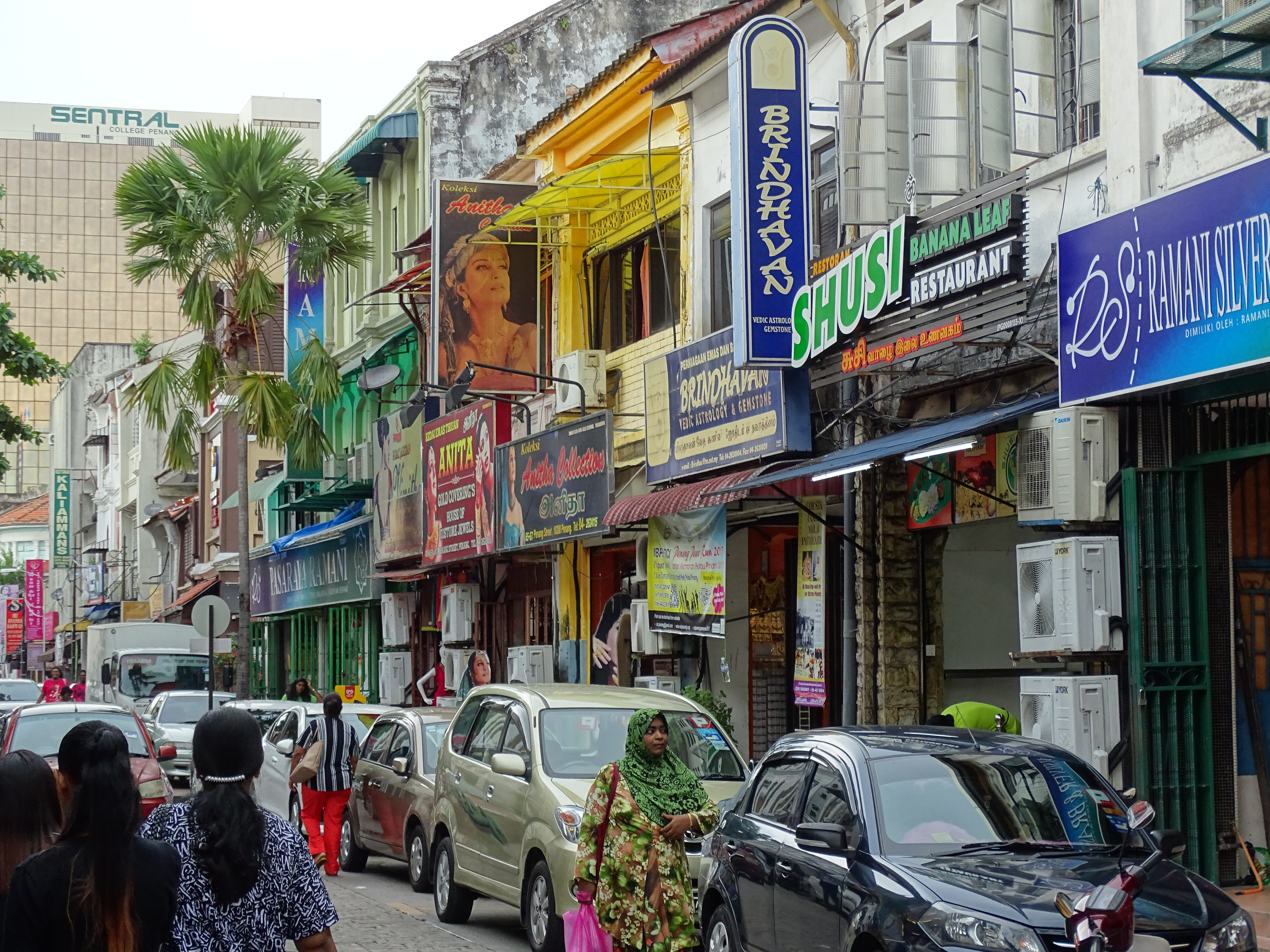
Little India, Penang

- Little India, (Jalan Tengku Kelana), Klang
- Brickfields (Jalan Tun Sambanthan), Kuala Lumpur
- Jalan Welman, Pekan Lama Rawang, Rawang, Selangor
- Jalan Masjid India, Kuala Lumpur
- Little India, Penang
- Paya Besar, Kulim, Kedah
- Jalan Taming Sari, Taiping, Perak
- Little India, Ipoh, Perak
- Jalan Bendahara – Jalan Temenggong intersection in Bandar Hilir, Melaka
- Little India, Malacca
- Jalan Yam Tuan, Seremban
- Jalan Trus, Johor Bahru, Johor
- Jalan India (formerly known as Kling Street), Kuching, Sarawak

=== Myanmar ===
- Mugal Road, Yangon

=== Philippines ===
- United Nations Avenue, Paco, Manila

=== Saudi Arabia ===
- Al Hara, Riyadh
- Al Azzizeyah, Jeddah

=== Singapore ===
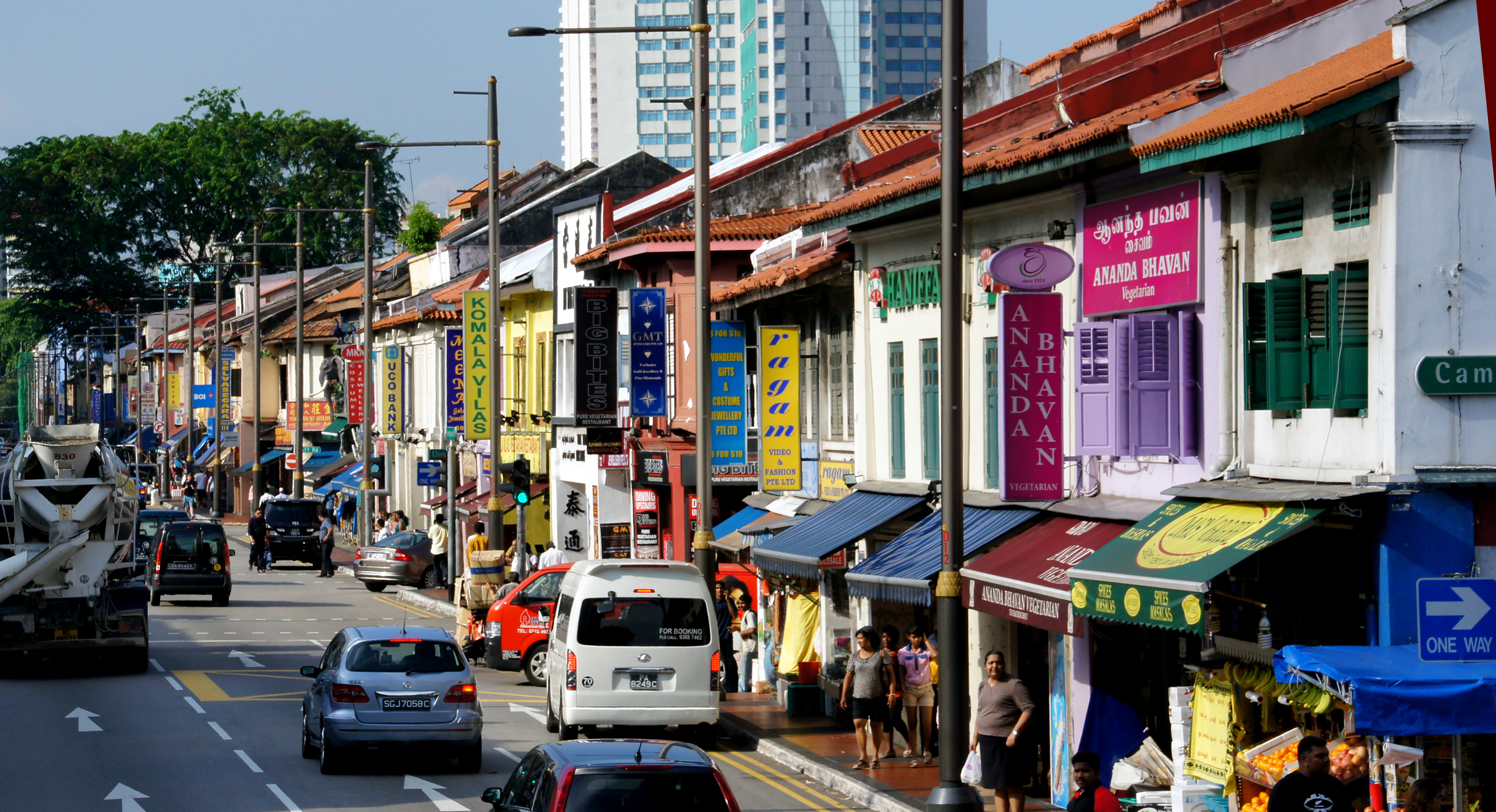
Little India, Singapore

- Little India

=== Thailand ===
- Phahurat, Bangkok
- Thanon Pan, Silom, Bangkok
- Indra Square, Pratunam, Bangkok

=== United Arab Emirates ===
In the UAE, Indians constitute more than 27% of the population. Here are some areas with a comparatively larger concentration of Indians.

- Bur Dubai, Dubai
- Al Karama, Dubai
- Satwa, Dubai
- Ras al-Khaimah
- Sharjah
- Umm al-Quwain
- Fujairah
- Abu Dhabi
- Ajman

=== Oman ===
The Sultanate of Oman is home to many expatriates, of which Indians form the largest constituency. The southeastern side of the business district of Ruwi is known as Muscat's Little India.

- Ghallah
- Ruwi

== Europe ==
=== France ===
- Paris, La Chapelle and around Le Nord

=== Germany ===
- Frankfurt, on the corner of Münchner and Weser street.

=== Italy ===
- Via Principe Amedeo, 303/305, 00185 Roma, Italy

=== Spain ===
- Calle de Lavapiés, 28012 Madrid, Spain, Lavapiés, Madrid

=== The Netherlands ===
- The Hague, Paul Krügerlaan, Transvaal (shopping street)

=== Norway ===
- Tøyengata and Oslo

=== United Kingdom ===
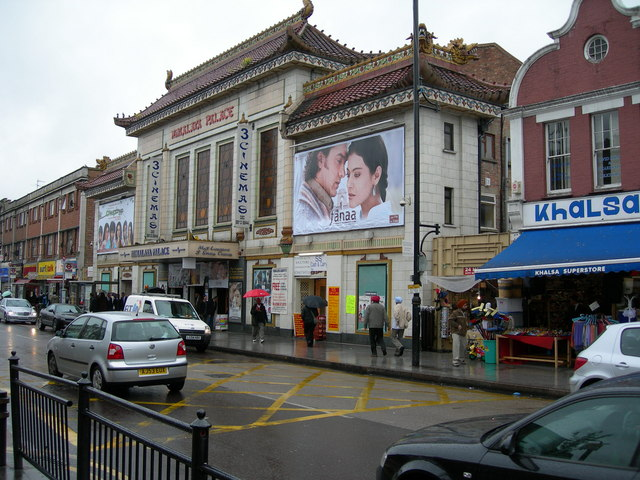
Southall, West London

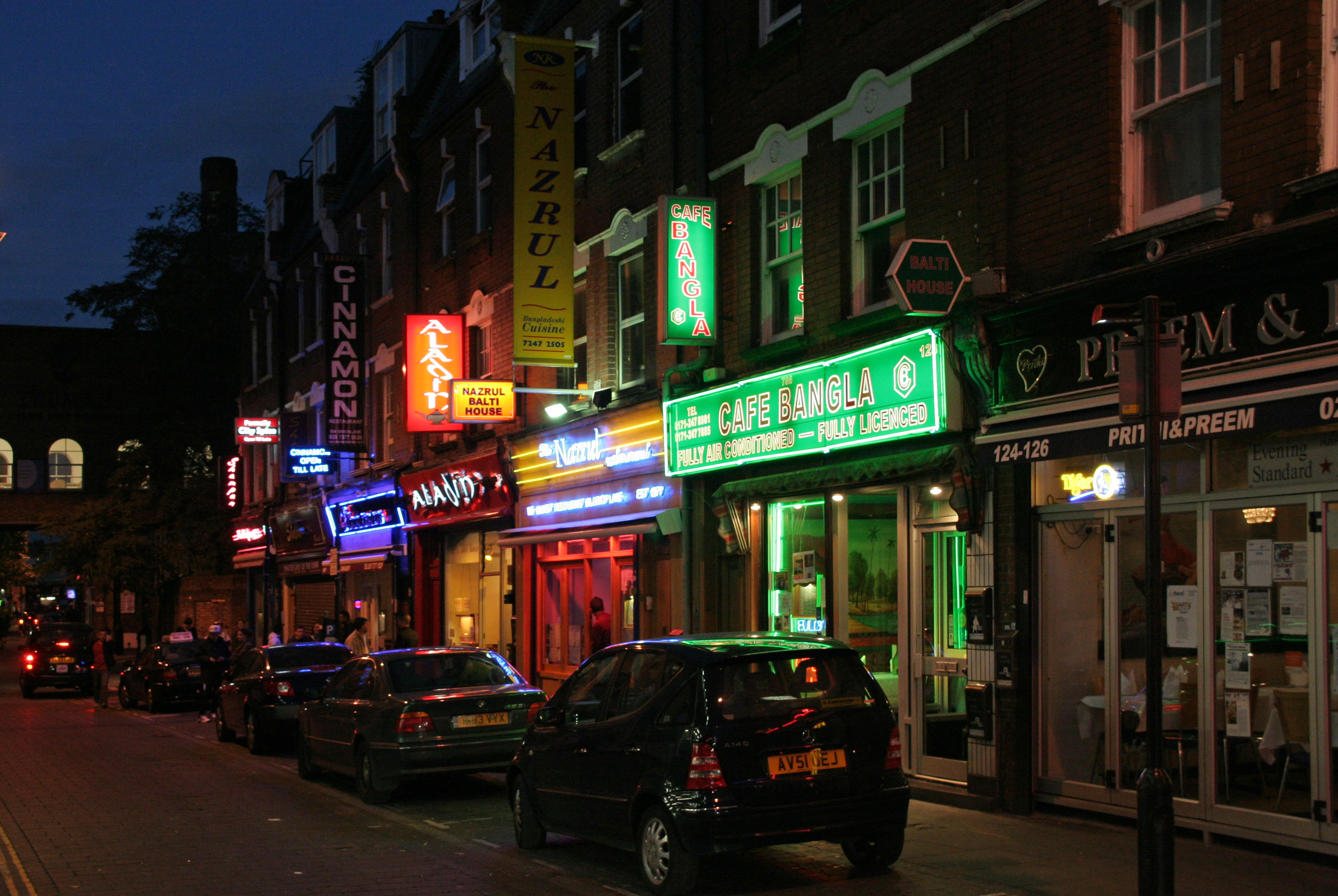
Brick Lane, East London

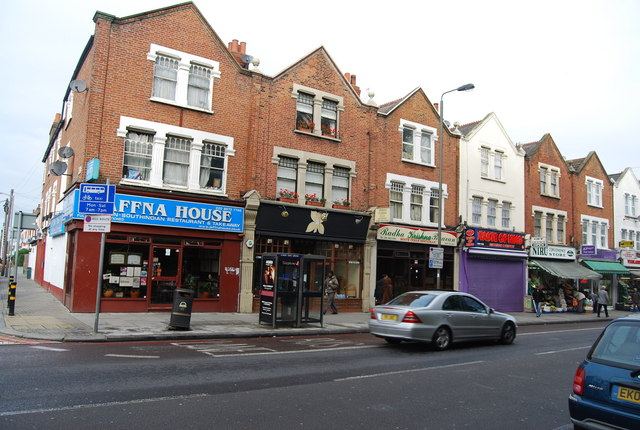
Tooting, South London

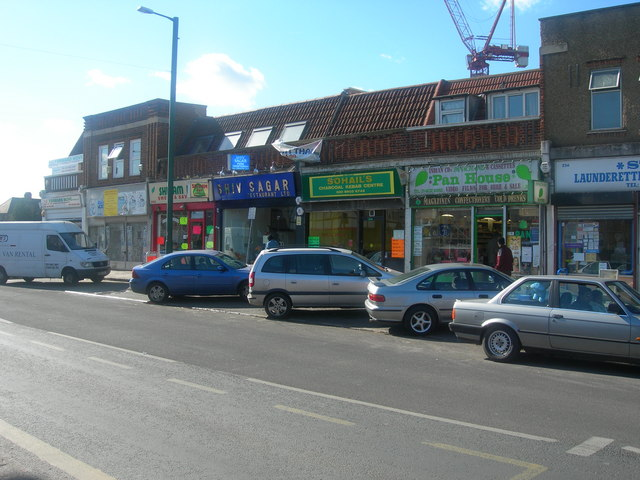
Ealing Road, Wembley

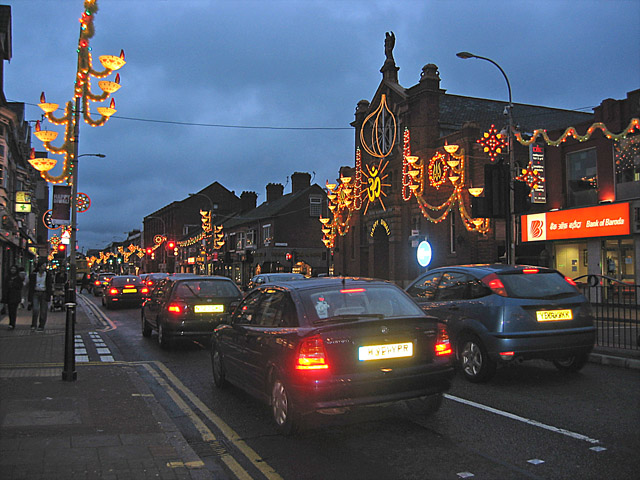
Golden Mile, Leicester

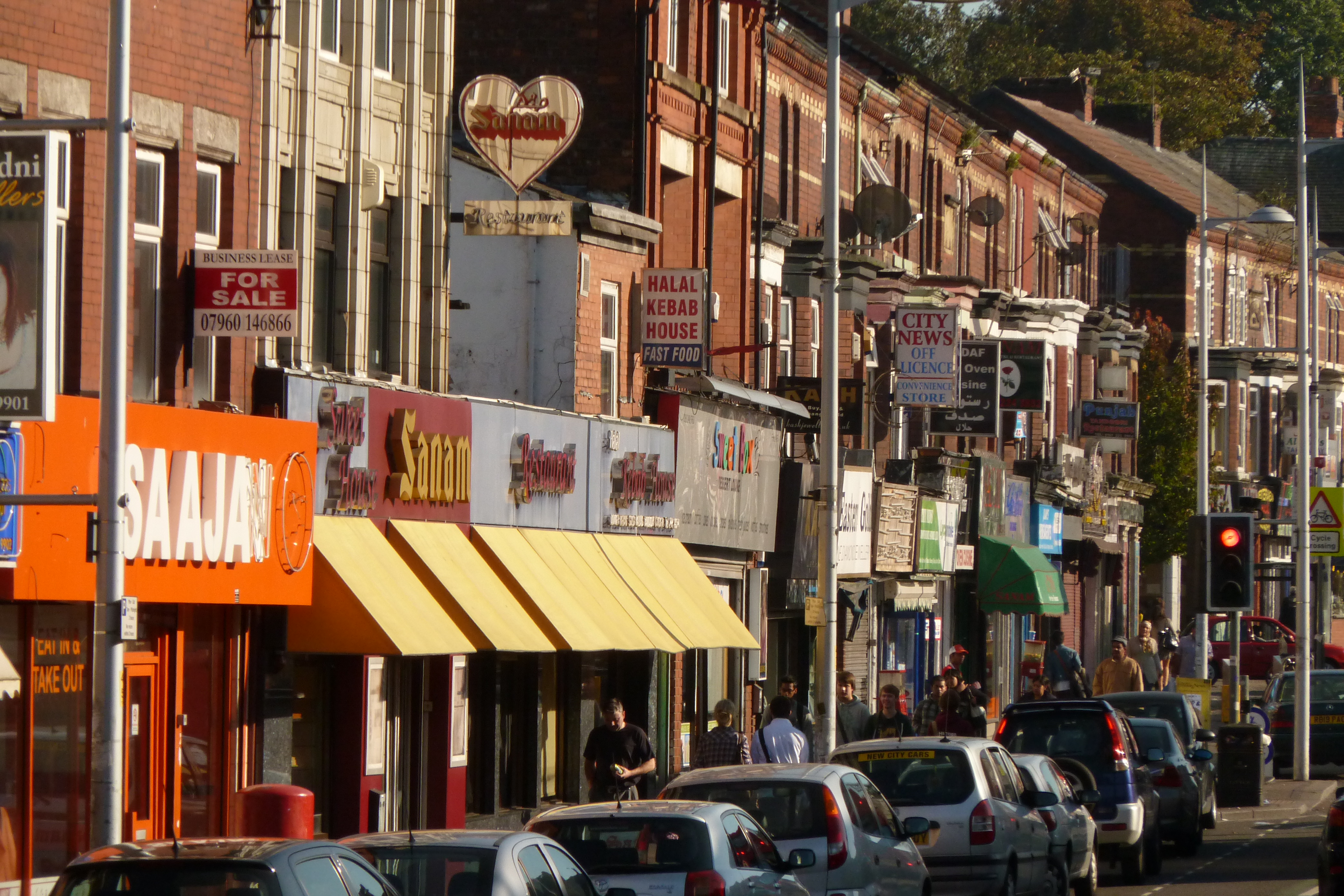
Curry Mile, Rusholme, Manchester

- Belgrave, Leicester, Leicestershire
- Blackburn, Lancashire
- Brent, London
- Brick Lane, London
- Ealing, London
- East Ham, London
- Forest Gate, London
- Green Street, Newham, London
- Govanhill, Glasgow
- Handsworth, Birmingham
- Harrow, London
- Hyson Green, Nottingham
- Ilford, London
- Kingsbury, London
- Latimer, Leicester, Leicestershire
- Manor Park, London
- New Malden, London
- Preston, Lancashire
- Rusholme, Manchester
  - Curry Mile
- Sharrow, Sheffield
- Slough, Berkshire
- Southall, London
- Stratford, London
- Tooting, London
- Uxbridge, London
- Wembley, London
- Walthamstow, London
- Wolverhampton, West Midlands

== Oceania ==
=== Australia ===
==== New South Wales ====
- Harris Park, a suburb in the City of Parramatta, is recognised as the "Little India" of Sydney, with a concentration of Indian restaurants and other businesses catering to Indian cultural needs.

==== Queensland ====
- Logan Road, Upper Mount Gravatt

==== South Australia ====
- Market Street, Adelaide

==== Victoria ====
- Little India (Foster Street), Dandenong

=== New Zealand ===
- Papatoetoe
- Sandringham Road, Sandringham, Auckland

== See also ==
- Greater India
- Indianisation
- Indosphere
- Non-resident Indian and person of Indian origin
