= Chinatown (disambiguation) =

Chinatown is a common name for an urban enclave with large numbers of Chinese people and/or businesses within a non-Chinese society.

Chinatown may also refer to:

== Places ==
- List of Chinatowns, specific Chinatowns around the world
  - Template:Chinatowns

=== Africa ===
- Chinatown, Johannesburg

=== Asia ===
- Chinatown, Bangkok
- Chinatown, Binondo
- Chinatown, Honiara
- Chinatown, Kolkata
- Chinatown, Lae
- Chinatown, Mumbai
- Chinatown, Singapore

=== Europe ===
- Chinatown, Glasgow
- Chinatown, London
- Chinatown, Milan

=== North America ===
- Chinatown, Boston
- Chinatown, Brooklyn
- Chinatown, California
  - Chinatown, Los Angeles
  - Chinatown, Oakland
  - Chinatown, San Francisco
  - Chinatown, San Jose
- Chinatown, Chicago
- Chinatown, Cleveland
- Chinatown, Flushing
- Chinatown, Honolulu
- Chinatown, Houston
- Chinatown, Los Angeles
- Chinatown, Manhattan
- Chinatown, Montreal
- Chinatown, New Orleans
- Chinatown, Newark
- Chinatown, Philadelphia
- Chinatown, Pittsburgh
- Chinatown, Portland, Maine
- Chinatown, Portland, Oregon
- Chinatown, Queens
- Chinatown, San Francisco
- Chinatown–International District, Seattle
- Chinatown, South Dakota
- Chinatown, Greater Toronto Area
  - Chinatown, Toronto
- Chinatown, Washington, D.C.
- Chinatown, Wisconsin, an unincorporated community (not a Chinatown)

=== Oceania ===
- Chinatown, Darwin

== Arts, entertainment, and media ==
=== Films ===
- China Town (1962 film), an Indian Hindi film
- Chinatown (1974 film), an American film directed by Roman Polanski and starring Jack Nicholson and Faye Dunaway
- 36 China Town, a 2006 Indian Hindi film
- China Town (2011 film), an Indian Malayalam film
- Chinatown, My Chinatown (film), a 1929 animated short film which was presented by Max Fleischer and directed by Dave Fleischer
- Captured in Chinatown, a 1935 American film directed by Elmer Clifton

=== Games ===
- Grand Theft Auto: Chinatown Wars, a 2009 video game

=== Music ===
==== Artists ====
- Chinatown (band), a Francophone pop band from Montreal, Canada

==== Albums ====
- Chinatown (The Be Good Tanyas album), 2003
- Chinatown (Thin Lizzy album), released in 1980

==== Songs ====
- "Chinatown, My Chinatown", a 1910 song, performed by Louis Armstrong and others, considered a standard of Dixieland music
- "Chinatown" (The Move song), 1971
- "Chinatown" (Liam Gallagher song), 2017
- "Chinatown" (Bleachers song), 2020
- "Chinatown", a song by Mykki Blanco from the 2012 album Mykki Blanco & the Mutant Angels
- "Chinatown", a song by Destroyer from the 2011 album Kaputt
- "Chinatown", a song by The Doobie Brothers from the 1977 album Livin' on the Fault Line
- "Chinatown", a song by The Felice Brothers from the 2014 album Favorite Waitress
- "Chinatown", a song by The Greg Kihn Band from the 1978 album Next of Kihn
- "Chinatown", a song by Joe Jackson from the 1982 album Night and Day
- "Chinatown", a song by Jets to Brazil from the 1998 album Orange Rhyming Dictionary
- "Chinatown", a song by Luna from the 1995 album Penthouse
- "Chinatown", a song by The Reivers from the 1991 album Pop Beloved
- "Chinatown", a song by Thin Lizzy from the 1980 album Chinatown
- "Chinatown", a song by Toto from the 2015 album Toto XIV
- "Chinatown", a song by Judie Tzuke from the 1980 album Sports Car
- "China Town", a song by Van Halen from the 2012 album A Different Kind of Truth
- "Chinatown", a song by Wild Nothing from the 2010 album Gemini
- "Chinatown", a song by John Zorn from the 1990 album Naked City

=== Television ===
- "Chinatown" (Due South), a 1994 episode
- "Chinatown" (Entourage), a 2005 episode
- "Chinatown" (Space Ghost Coast to Coast), a 1998 episode
- "Chinatown", a 2001 episode of Spin City

== Transportation ==
- Chinatown station (disambiguation), various stations containing the name Chinatown

== Other ==
- Angel of Chinatown, nickname of Rose Livingston, an American suffragette

== See also ==
Kitay-gorod, sometimes translated as China-city or Chinatown
