= Paya Besar =

Paya Besar may refer to:

- Paya Besar, Kedah
- Paya Besar, Pahang
- Paya Besar (federal constituency), represented in the Dewan Rakyat
- Paya Besar (state constituency), formerly represented in the Pahang State Legislative Council
