= Indian Americans in Greater Los Angeles =

Greater Los Angeles has the second-largest Indian American population in California, following the San Francisco Bay Area. As of 2015, there are 153,000 Indian Americans in greater Los Angeles and Indian Americans make up the fifth-largest Asian ancestry group in the metropolitan area Indian immigrants started to move to the suburbs areas of Southern California after the passage of the 1965 Hart-Celler Immigration Act, with a concentration of businesses in the southeastern Los Angeles County suburb of Artesia, California.

== See also ==
- Little India, Artesia, California
