= Little India, Ipoh =

Little India Ipoh லிட்டில் இந்தியா,ஈப்போ
- ethnic enclave
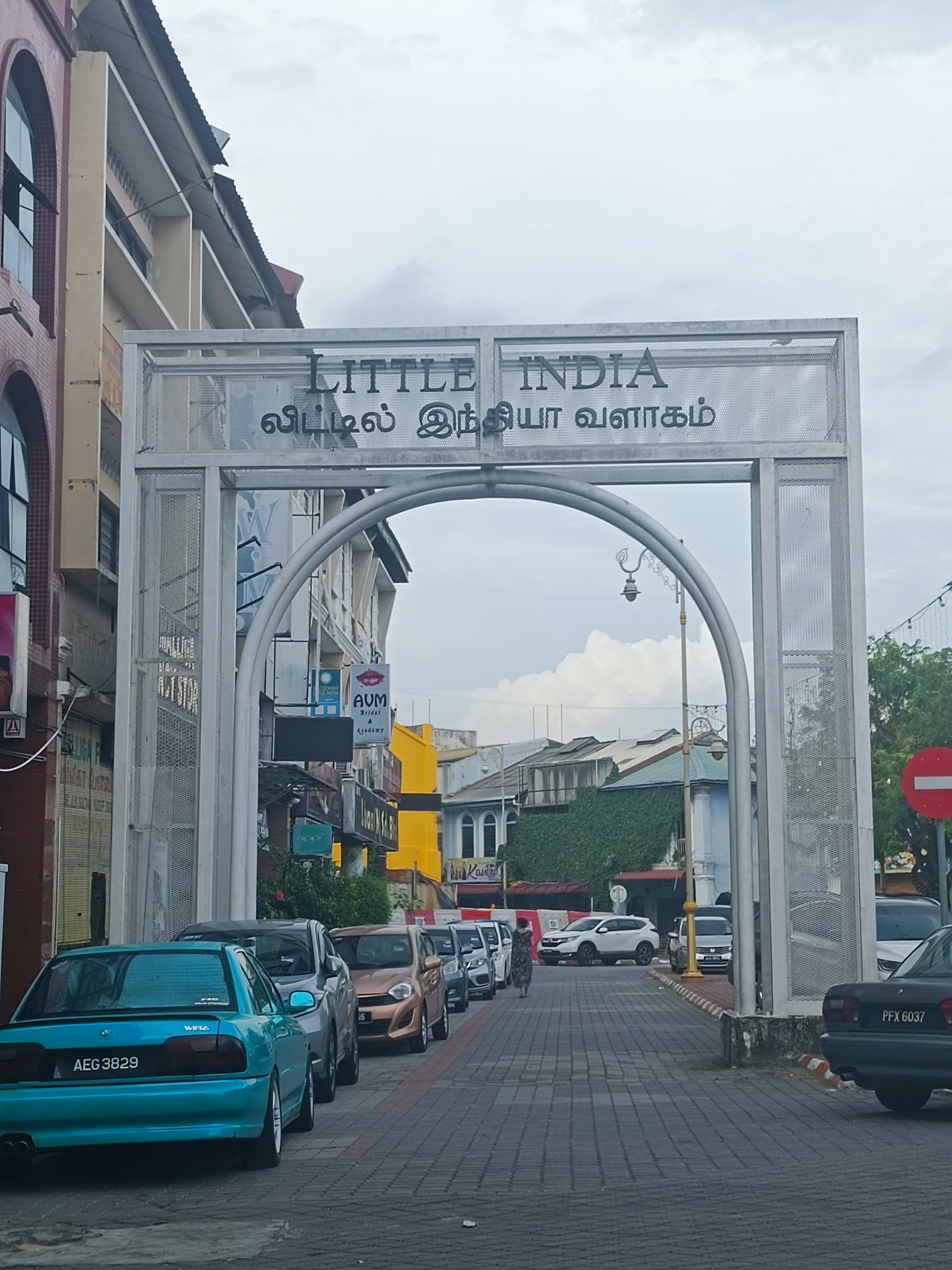
- One of the two arches built at Ipoh Little India

- Location within Malaysia
- Coordinates: 4°21′36″N 101°24′00″E
- Country: Malaysia
- State: Perak
- City: Ipoh

Government
  - Local Authority: City Hall Of Ipoh
- Time zone: UTC+8 (MST)

Little India, Ipoh (Tamil: லிட்டில் இந்தியா, ஈப்போ; Malay: India Kecil, Ipoh) is one of the major business centers of Malaysian Indians in Ipoh, Perak, Malaysia.

Ipoh Little India is an important business center in Ipoh city with various Indian related outlets. As well as a place that reflects the heritage of the Indian race; It is also a cultural center for Indians.

== Background ==
Several years ago, Little India was a hub for early immigrants and merchants from India, who congregated to create thriving businesses. At the time, tin was emerging as an important resource to industry in the Kinta Valley. The majority of early immigrants were of Nattukkotai Chettiar descent from South India, with a large number also from the Punjab region in the northern part of the country. The population of Little India has grown to be 65% Indian and 35% Chinese.

Every year the Deepavali Carnival is held by local traders.

== History ==
In the 900s, for immigrants from India; It also became a settlement center for traders. They built thriving businesses. In this way the settlement was transformed into a Little India reflecting the Indian heritage.

During that period, lead production was an important source of industry in the Kinta Valley. In the mid-19th century, silver was mined on a large scale in Ipoh.

=== Business development ===
Thousands of people came from many states of India to do business. Gujaratis came to Ipoh Little India to trade in carpets, silk fabrics, bedspreads etc

In the early 20th century many British companies established business centers in Ipoh. And so the city of Ipoh began to gain fame. Most of these companies have set up their headquarters very close to Ipoh Little India.

In 1902 famous banks like 'Chartered Bank' of India, 'Australia-China Company' started their offices in Ipoh. They set up their offices on the same Jalan Sultan Yussuf road where Ipoh Little India is located.

=== Karaikudi Tamils ===
During this period many Tamils from Karaikudi in Tamil Nadu came to Ipoh. They provided financial assistance in many forms to the Chinese lead trade. They charged interest on it.

In later days these people were called Nagarats or Chettiars (Nattukkotai Chettiar). It is noteworthy that they gained influence to the extent of providing monetary assistance to domestic banks.

=== Lagat Road ===
Jalan Lahat, near Ipoh Little India Road, is still a major road today. Besides, there is a road named Chetti Street, within the Ipoh Little India complex. The current name of the road is Jalan Sultan Yussuf. Three banks have been set up:

- Bank of Chettinad (1943)
- Bank of Madurai (1943)
- Indian Overseas Bank (1943)

The townspeople built a temple in 1907 on Lagat Road. Its name is Sri Thandayuthabani Alayam. It is also called Chettiar Temple.

=== MM. S. Meyyappan Chettiars ===
In the 1940s the M. S. Meyyappan Chettiar in Ipoh Little India. A bank came into operation in the name of It is M. S. It was run by brothers known as M. S. Meyyappan Chettiars. The headquarters of that bank was then in Karaikudi.

Ipoh Little India's main road is also nicknamed Ipoh Chetty Street. Many houses like the mansions still exist in the Karaikudi area of Tamil Nadu.

=== 13 May communal riots ===
The house plots capture the historical traces of the Chettiars' past. However, many of these buildings were purchased by the Chinese. Rows and rows of Karaikudi estates have now been transformed into Chinese business centers.

In 1969, there was a racial riot in Malaysia. Subsequently, many Karaikudi Tamils sold their houses in Ipoh Little India and returned to Tamil Nadu. The Chinese bought those houses at very low prices.

== Location ==
Little India stretches from Jalan Sultan Yussuf to Jalan Lahat.

== Gallery ==
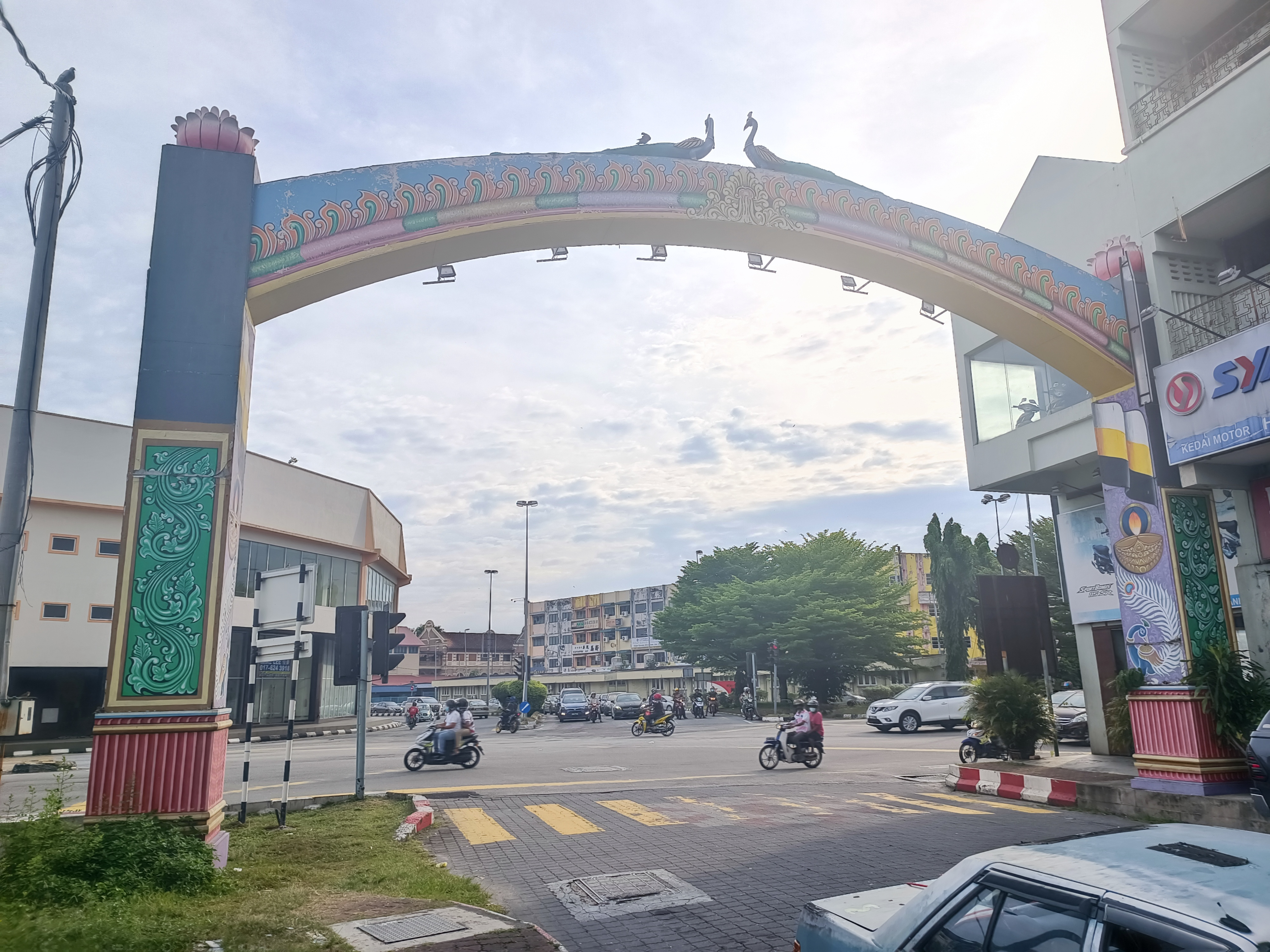
Another arch at little India

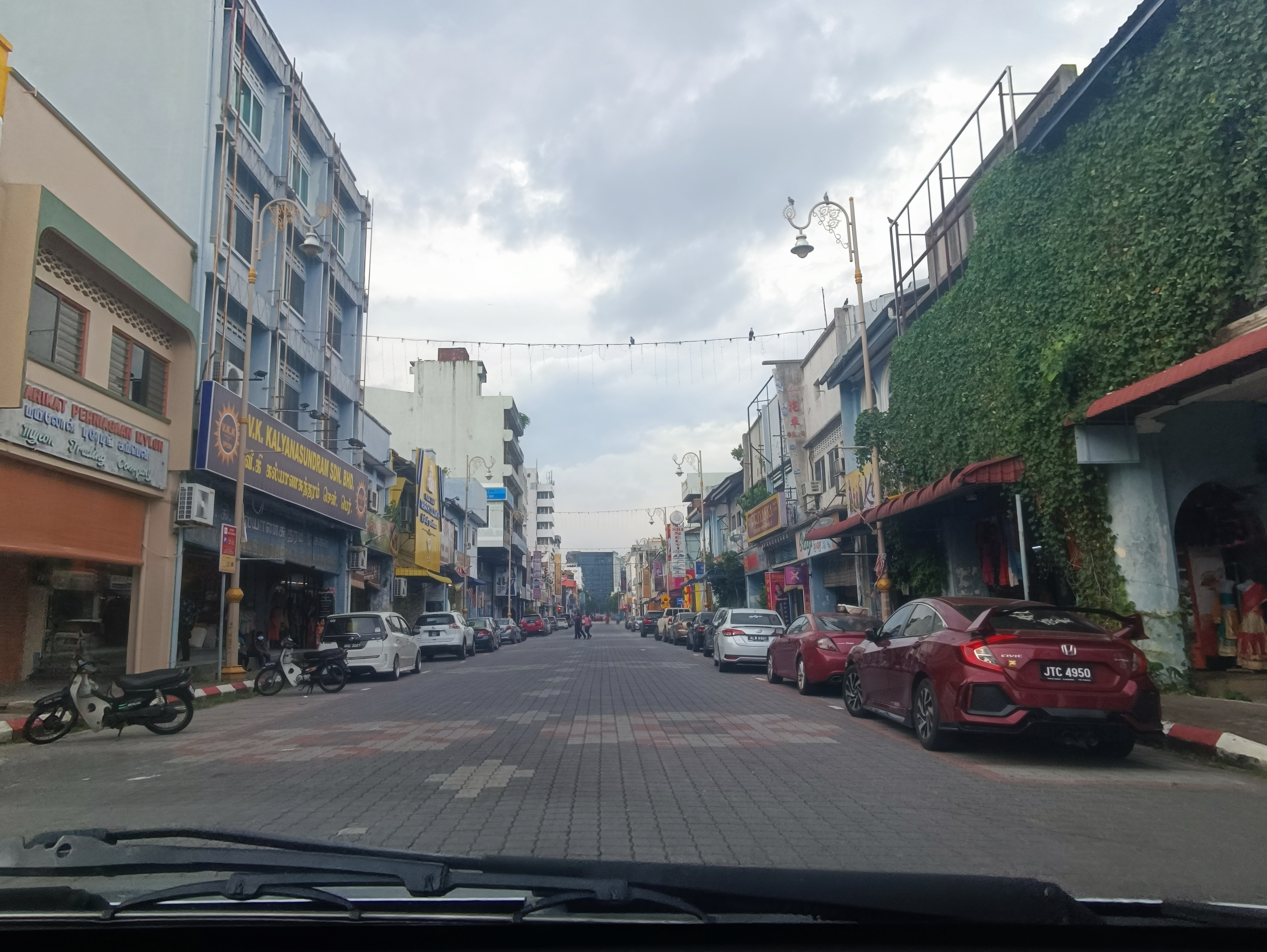
Street View

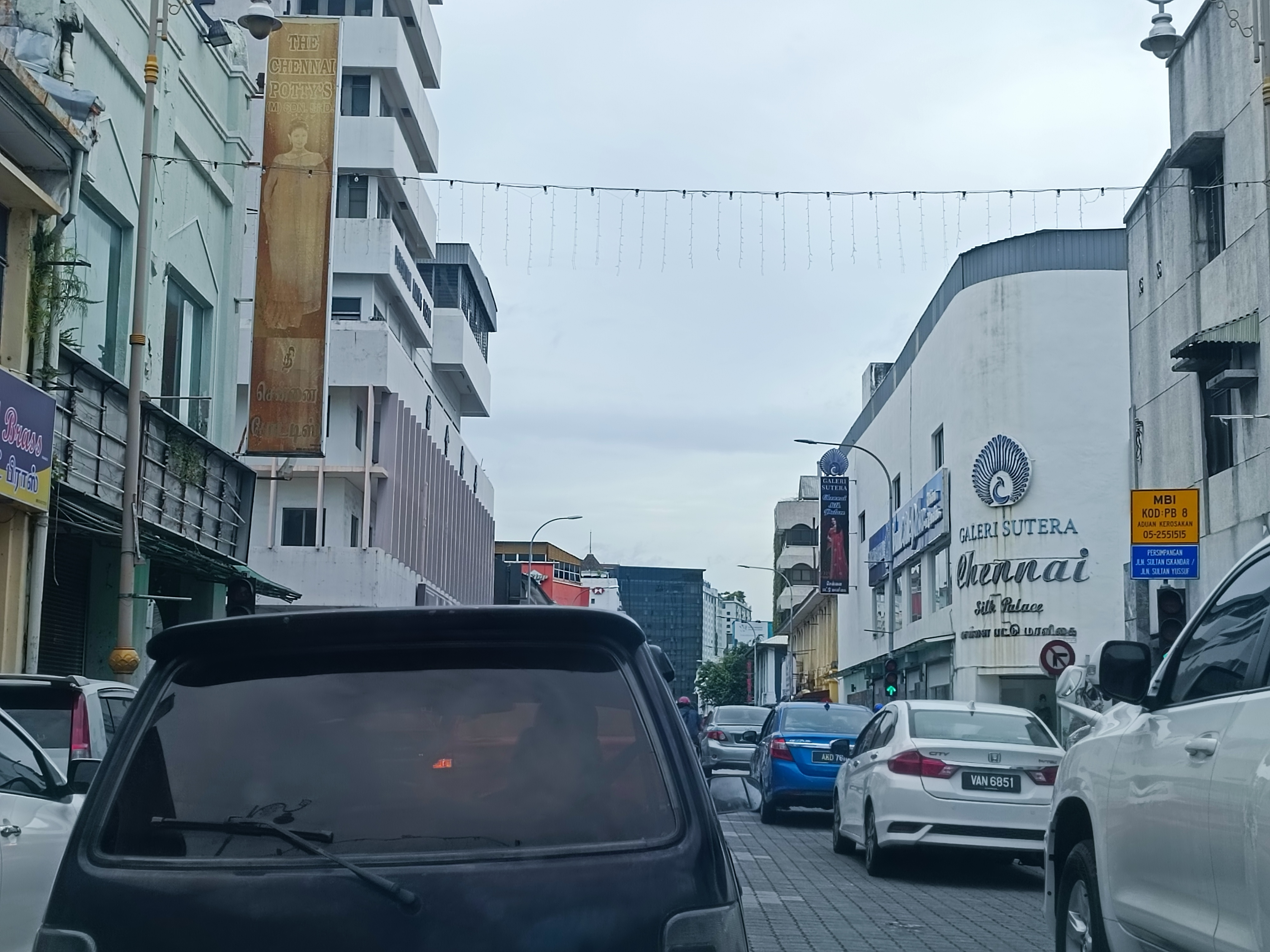
Street View

== See also ==
- Brickfields
- Little India, Penang
- Little India, Malacca
- Paya Besar (Kulim Little India)
- Little India, Singapore
