= Little India, Penang =

Little India
- Ethnic enclave in George Town

Other transcription(s)
  - Tamil: லிட்டில் இந்தியா
  - Malay: India Kecil
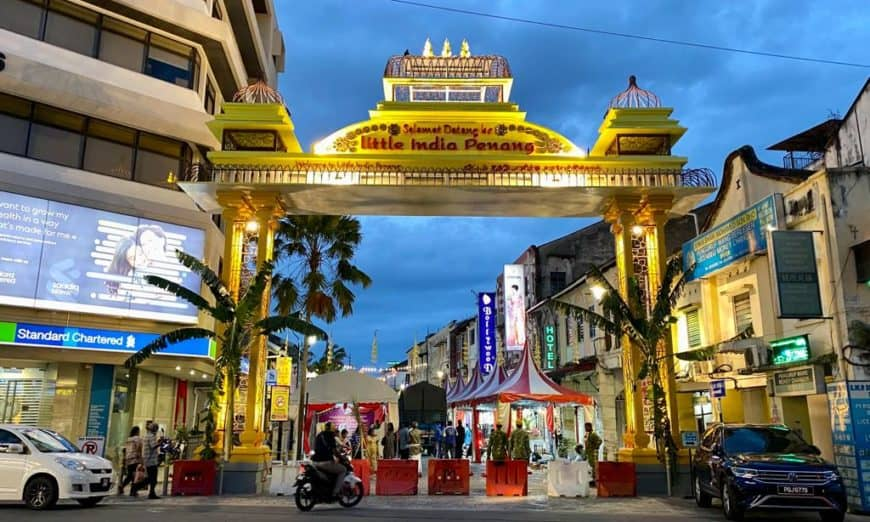

- Location within George Town in Penang
- Coordinates: 5°25′04″N 100°20′19″E
- Country: Malaysia
- State: Penang
- City: George Town

Government
  - Local government: Penang Island City Council
- Time zone: UTC+8 (MST)
- Postal code: 10200
- Area code(s): +604
- Website: penanglittleindia.blogspot.my

Little India (Tamil: குட்டி இந்தியா) is an ethnic Indian enclave located within the downtown core of George Town within the Malaysian state of Penang. The oldest Hindu temple in Penang, Sri Mahamariamman Temple is located here.

== Economy ==
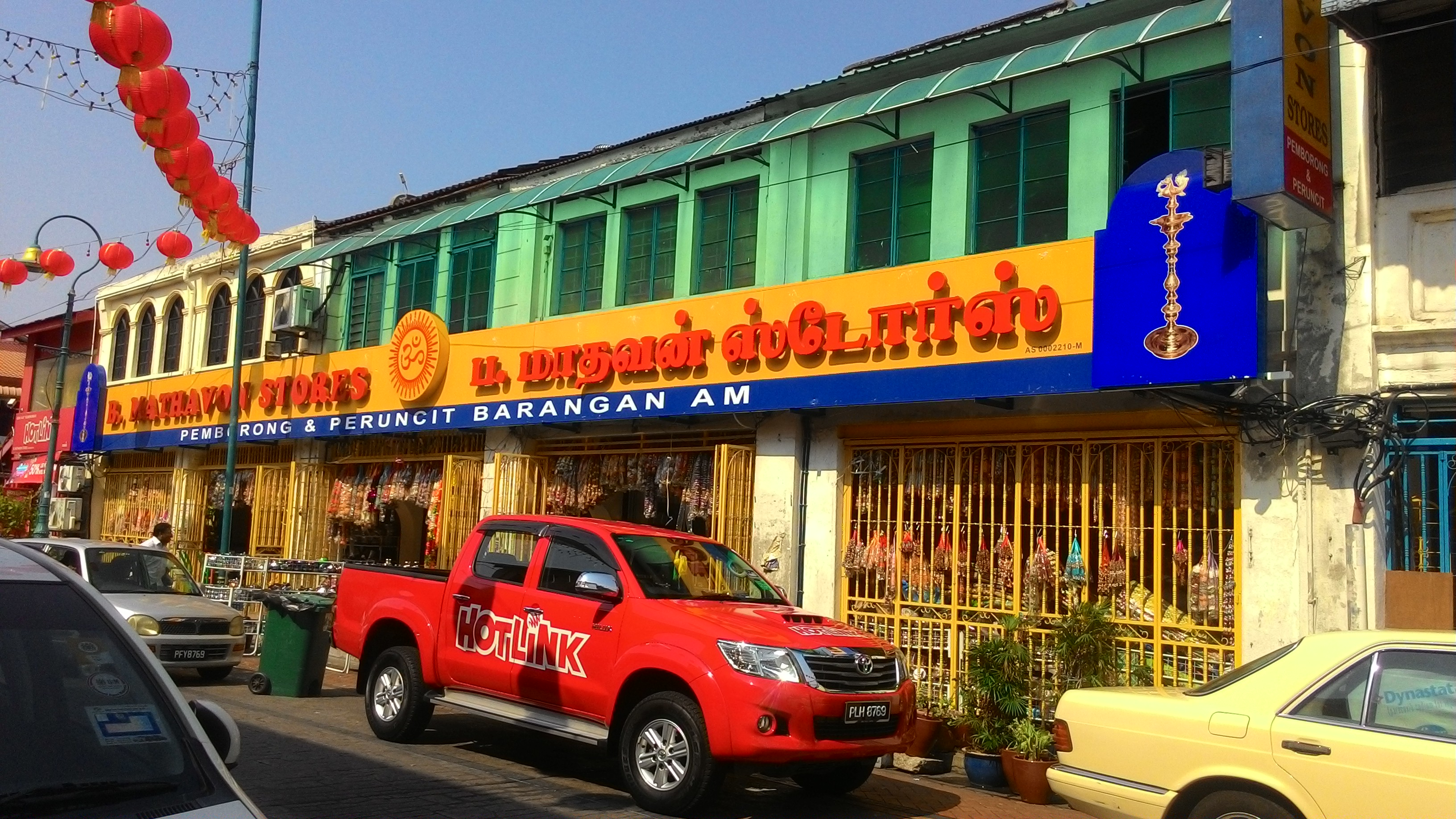
B.Mathavan Store at the Little India

The Little India is also main business district in Georgetown, Penang. Various Indian related business can be found here. Although, majority of business here were owned by the Indian there also small number of Chinese owned shop. There are many Indian fashion store (Mainly in Market Street), they sell mostly saree, silk and cotton, almost anything that has the essence of India. Traditional costumes, spices, precious gold and costume jewelry which use semi-precious gems are sold by most of the shops. There also large number of restaurant and cafe which sales Indian culinary and western foods. There are also music video stores with the latest Bollywood movies and songs.

== Education ==
Sentral College Penang located in the Little India Zone. The hostel of Penang Disted College, Disted Space also located in the zone. Meanwhile, SEGi College Penang located at Greenhall, which is just a walking distance from Little India.

== See also ==
- Brickfields
- Little India, Malacca
- Paya Besar
- Little India, Ipoh
- Little India, Singapore
