= Thai Town =

Thai Town could refer to:

- Thai Town, Los Angeles
- Thai Town, Sydney
