= Chinatown, Cleveland =

Chinatown, Cleveland were two distinctly named places:

- Old Chinatown, Cleveland (Rockwell Avenue Chinatown), defunct since 2006, which sits west of Interstate 90
- St. Clair-Superior, known as "Chinatown Cleveland" prior to 2006, now known as "AsiaTown", which sits east of Interstate 90
