= Gerrard India Bazaar =

Little India
- Neighbourhood, BIA
- Gerrard India Bazaar BIA
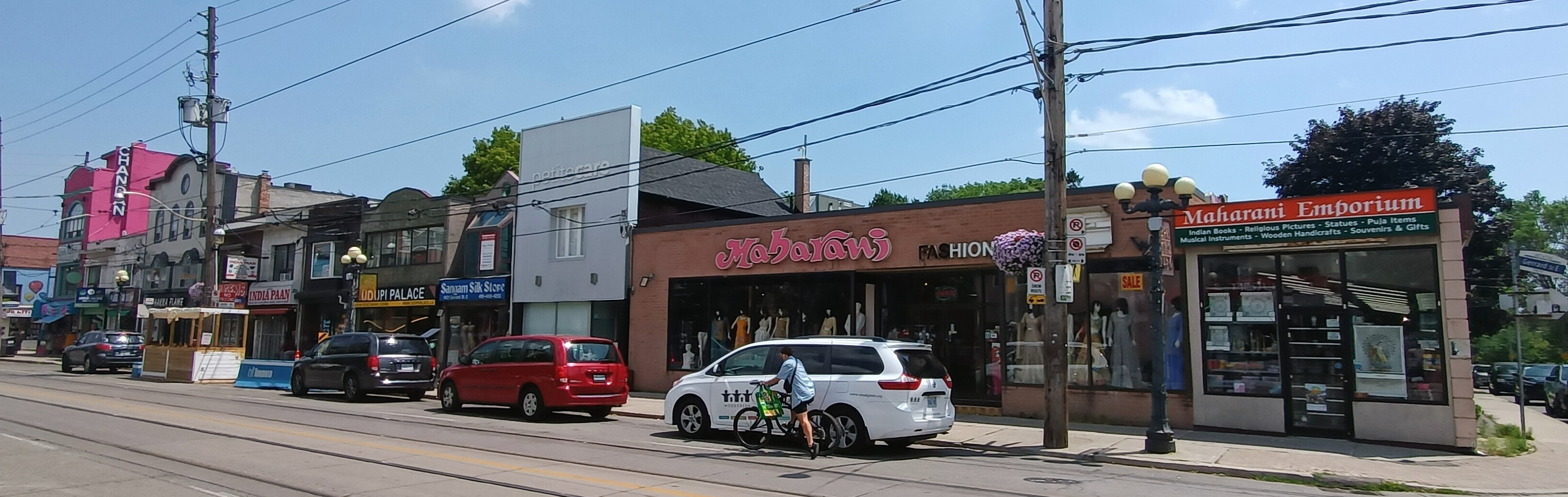
- Toronto's Little India in 2026

- Location within Toronto
- Coordinates: 43.67153°N 79.32441°W
- Country: Canada
- Province: Ontario
- City: Toronto

Gerrard India Bazaar, also known as Little India, is a commercial South Asian ethnic enclave in the Leslieville neighbourhood of Toronto, Ontario, Canada.

Known as the city's prime Little India and Little Pakistan, it consists of Indian, Pakistani, Bangladeshi, Nepali and Sri Lankan restaurants, cafés, grocery stores, and clothing stores catering to Toronto's Desi community.

== Background ==
The area of the bazaar has never housed a significant South Asian population, but it has historically served as a commercial centre for South Asians living in Greater Toronto and eventually established itself as one of the city's top cultural landmarks. It celebrates the annual Festival of South Asia in late August.

The Gerrard India Bazaar Business Improvement Area (BIA) sponsors events that appeal to the different South Asian groups that shop in the area: in 2004, Diwali, the Hindu and Sikh festival of lights, and Eid ul-Fitr, the Islamic feast day that marks the end of Ramadan, occurred around the same time in November. The BIA held a joint Diwali-Eid festival.

Each July, the BIA holds its annual two-day Festival of South Asia, one of the largest South Asian festivals in North America.

The neighbourhood is serviced by the 506 Carlton streetcar.

== History ==
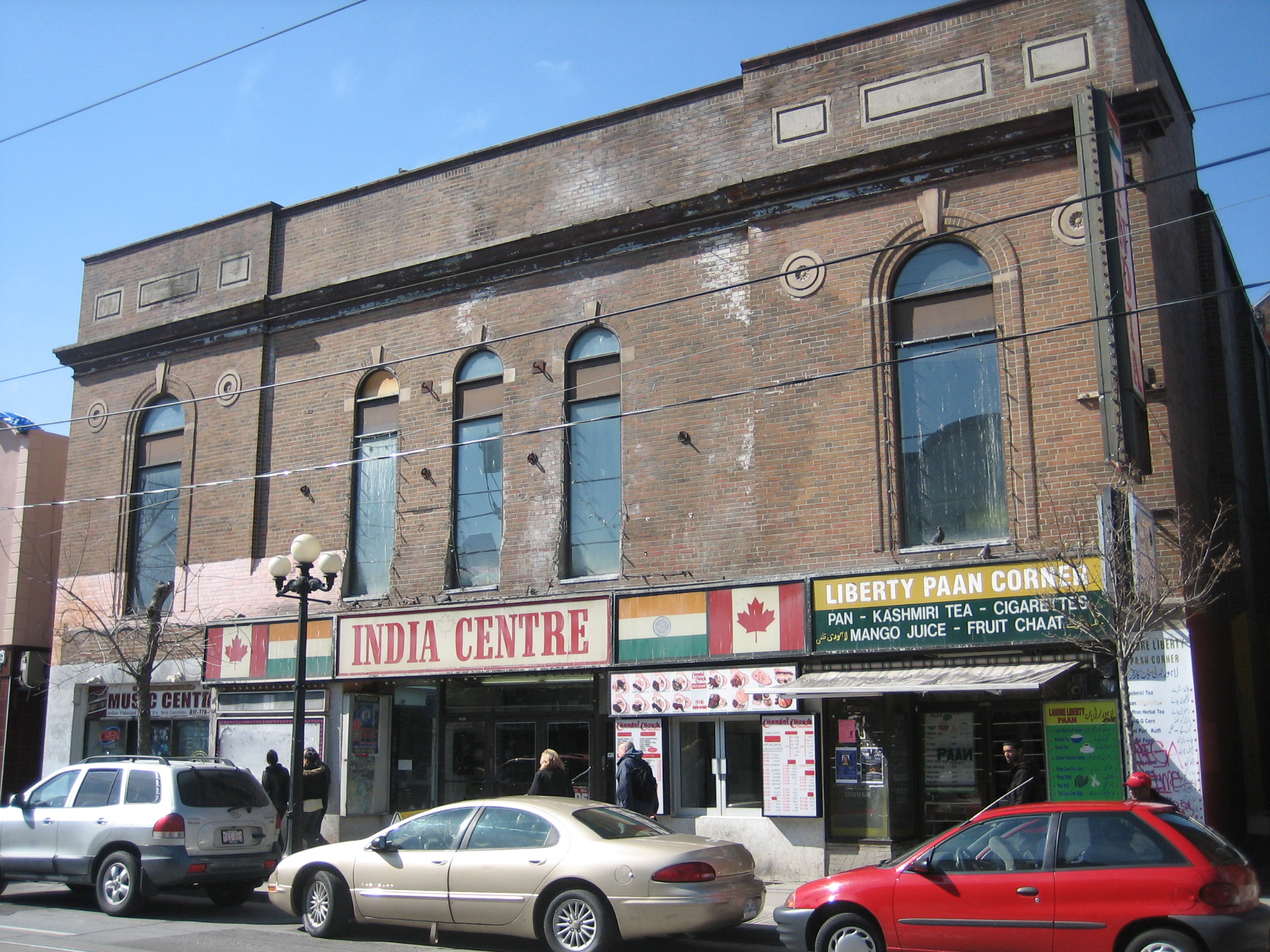
The India Centre at the Gerrard India Bazaar. In the 1970s, the building screened Bollywood and Pakistani films, serving as the centre of a growing group of businesses catered to the South Asian community.

Toronto's Little India started in 1972 when businessman Gian Naaz rented (and later purchased) the Eastwood Theatre on Gerrard Street, which he named the Naaz Theatre, and began to screen Bollywood and Pakistani films, reputedly the first cinema in North America to exclusively screen South Asian films. This attracted large numbers of Indo-Canadian visitors from across the Greater Toronto Area, leading to a number of new businesses opening to cater the South Asian community. The area expanded rapidly and to nearly 100 stores and restaurants spreading over a large stretch of the street between Greenwood Avenue to Coxwell Avenue. Despite there being few South Asians residents in that part of the city, Naz opened his theatre in the economically depressed, largely British-Canadian area because it was the cheapest venue he could find.

The success of the theatre resulted in South Asian restaurants and retailers opening in previously empty storefronts as the area became a gathering point for South Asians in the 1970s and the Gerrard Indian Bazaar developed and thrived with daily visitors. The first of these restaurants was MotiMahal, which was opened by Gurjit Chadha and his wife in 1975, with the encouragement of friends. By the 1980s, “Little India” was firmly established. The area contained approximately 100 South Asian shops and restaurants and received an estimated 100,000 tourists in 1984, including visitors from as far as Detroit.

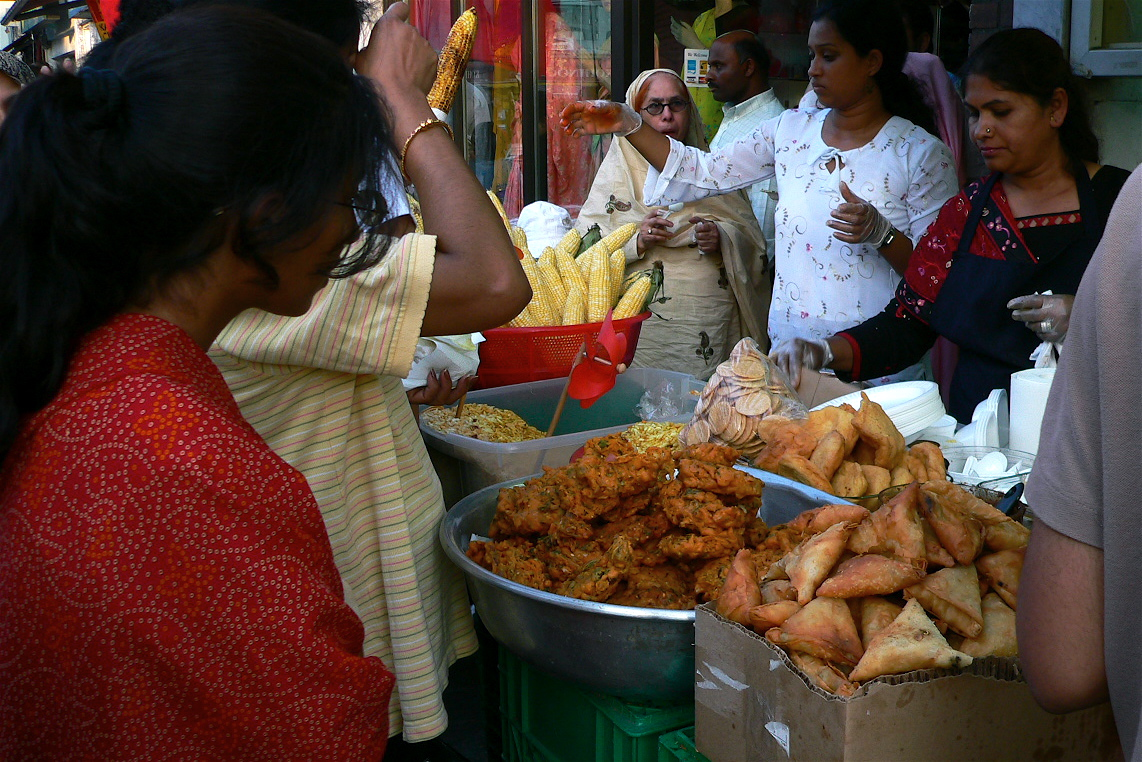
Food being sold in Little India.

The growth of Little India was met with resistance from some in the largely British-Canadian adjacent neighbourhood with incidents of vandalism and racist violence in the 1970s. With incidents escalating and shop owners feeling the police ignoring the crimes, in 1977 the South Asian community started an anti-racist taskforce to report racist attacks. The Gerrard India Bazaar BIA was formed in 1982 to promote the area's businesses and coordinate events.

The Naaz Theatre eventually closed in 1985 when introduction of VHS tape and Bollywood videos became more widespread. The theatre was revival in the 1990s but eventually closed and the lower levels were converted into a small mall, The India Centre. In 2015 it was converted into a mix use building known as the Multani Village, with rental apartments and street level stores.

== Legacy ==
While South Asian businesses continue to thrive along Gerrard Street, it lost its central position of South Asian commerce since the late 2000s as an increasing number of South Asian businesses opened in other parts of Greater Toronto to support the growing South Asian immigrant population in the region. Within Toronto, multiple neighbourhoods in Scarborough and Etobicoke contain high concentrations of South Asian businesses. Other developed or emerging South Asian neighbourhoods are also located in the surrounding cities of Mississauga, Brampton, Milton, Markham, Pickering, and Ajax.
