= Koreatown (disambiguation) =

A Koreatown is an ethnic enclave of Koreans.

Koreatown may specifically refer to:

- Koreatown, Atlanta
- Koreatown, Baltimore
- Koreatown, Chicago
- Koreatown, Dallas
- Koreatown, Fort Lee
- Koreatown, Garden Grove
- Koreatown, Houston
- Koreatown, Los Angeles
- Koreatown, Manhattan
- Koreatown, Oakland
- Koreatown, Osaka
- Koreatown, Palisades Park
- Koreatown, Philadelphia
- Koreatown, Queens
- Koreatown, San Francisco
- Koreatown, Shanghai
- Koreatown, Toronto

== Other ==
- Korean diaspora
