= Chinatown, Johannesburg =

Chinatown, Johannesburg could refer to:

- Commissioner Street (Johannesburg), the old Chinatown
- Cyrildene, the new Johannesburg Chinatown
