= Chinatown station =

Chinatown Station may refer to transit stations in:

== United States ==
- Cermak–Chinatown station, an "L" station in Chicago, Illinois
- Chinatown station (Los Angeles Metro), a light rail station in Los Angeles, California
- Chinatown station (MBTA), a subway station in Boston, Massachusetts
- Chinatown station (Muni Metro), a light rail station in San Francisco, California
- Chinatown station (SEPTA), a subway station in Philadelphia, Pennsylvania
- Gallery Place station (formerly named Gallery Place–Chinatown station), a metro station in Washington, DC
- Hōlau station, also known as Chinatown station, a planned light metro station in Honolulu, Hawaiʻi
- International District/Chinatown station, a light rail station in Seattle, Washington
- Old Town/Chinatown station, a light rail station in Portland, Oregon

== Worldwide ==
- Chinatown MRT station, an interchange station on the North East (NEL) and Downtown (DTL) lines in Singapore
- Rose China Town light rail station, a light rail station in New Taipei, Taiwan
- Stadium–Chinatown station, a SkyTrain station in Vancouver, Canada
- Chinatown station on the CBD and South East Light Rail in Sydney, NSW, Australia
