= Little Tokyo (disambiguation) =

Little Tokyo may refer to:

- Little Tokyo, Los Angeles
- Japantown, Vancouver
- Little Tokyo, U.S.A., a 1942 American film
- Another term for a Japantown
- Little Tokyo (wrestler) (1941–2011), Japanese professional wrestler
- A block in Blok M, Jakarta, Indonesia
