= Chinatown, California =

Chinatown, California may refer to:

- Chinatown, Los Angeles
- Chinatown, Oakland
- Chinatown, San Francisco
- Chinatown, San Jose
