= Little India, Artesia, California =

Indian enclave in southern California, US

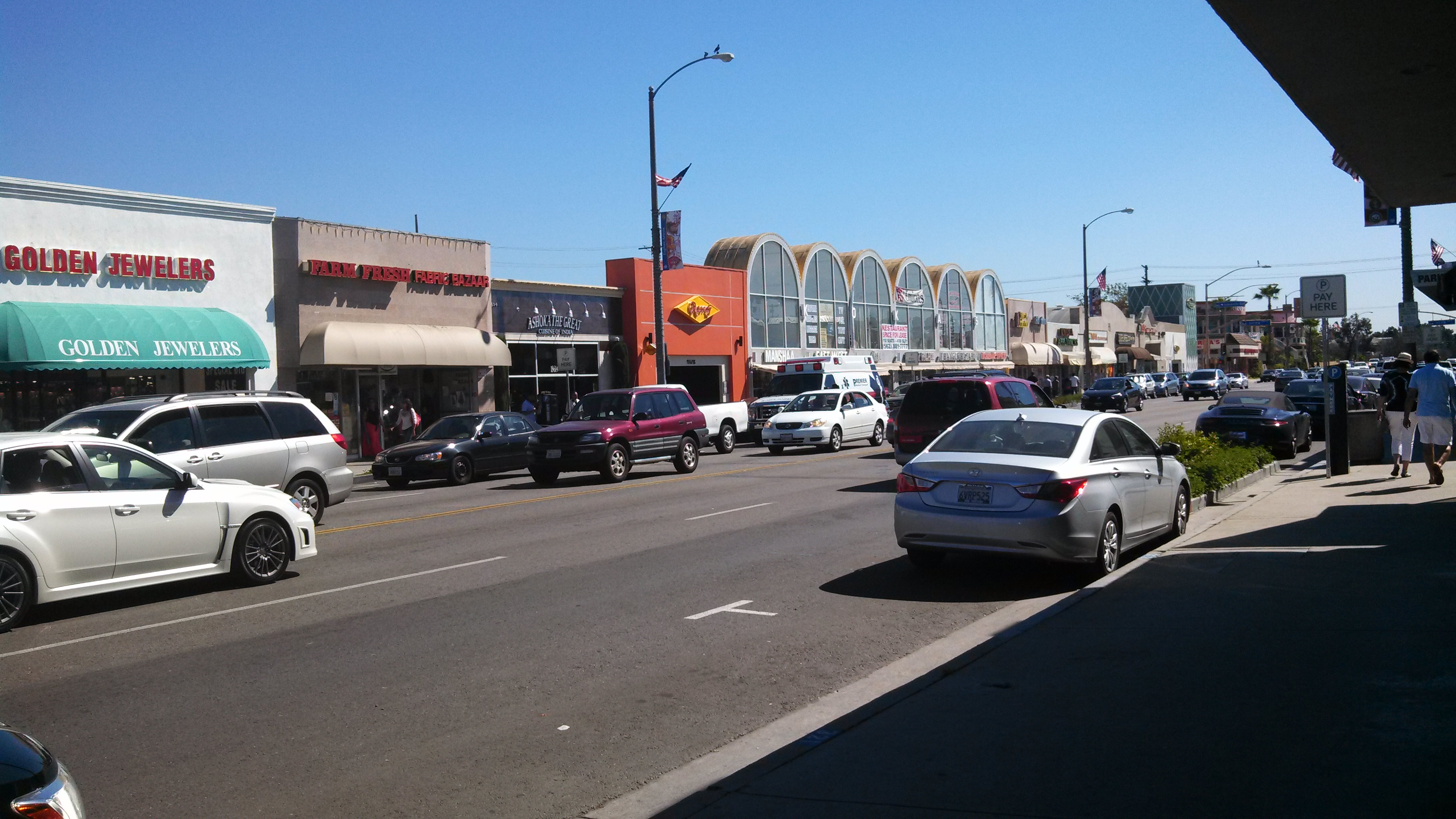
Little India c. 2015

Little India is an Indian enclave centered on Pioneer Boulevard between 183rd and 188th streets in the city of Artesia, California. It is the largest Indian enclave in southern California. As of 2003, approximately 120 shops in the area catered to Indian customers. Though (as of 2004) less than 5% of the city's population was Indian American, Little India contributed approximately a quarter of the city's sales tax receipts.

== History ==
In 1965, the Immigration and Nationality Act abolished restrictive quotas on immigrants from certain regions. During the ensuing increase in immigration from India to the United States, many Indians settled in Los Angeles and Orange Counties. The region's first Indian grocery store was initially established in Hollywood, but it relocated to Artesia in 1970 at the behest of Indians living in Orange County. Other Indian immigrants also settled in Artesia in the 1970s, which was relatively inexpensive at the time. In 1986, there were about 25 Indian businesses on Pioneer Boulevard; the number had grown to about 90 (or 80% of the retail businesses in the core area) by 1995.

In the 1980s and 1990s, there were tensions in the community between Indian businesses/residents and non-Indian businesses/residents. Some local politicians proposed signage officially designating the area as "Little India" in 2004, but this proved divisive. Many opposed such signage on the grounds that it would improperly privilege one ethnic group in a diverse area. Ultimately, the area was designated the Artesia International and Cultural Shopping District on street signs.

As of the late 2010s and early 2020s, the area had begun to struggle as a result of competition from Indian businesses elsewhere in the Los Angeles area and on the internet.

== Culture ==
Cultural events held in Little India include celebrations of Indian Independence Day, Diwali, and Navratri. The largest Indian immigrant newspaper in southern California is based in Artesia.

== See also ==
- Little India (location)

== Further reading/viewing ==
- EAT: Los Angeles guide to Little India restaurants
- The Serious Shopping Guide: Los Angeles guide to Little India shopping
- CBS Local guide to Little India
- Wares, Donna (2008-05-17). Great Escapes: Southern California. The Countryman Press. pp. 152–156. ISBN 978-0-88150-779-9.
- Visiting with Huell Howser episode about Little India
- Hamilton, Denise (July 20, 1997). "India Inc". L.A. Times.
- Del Valley, Alysha (May 27, 2010). "Little India offers SoCal exotic foods, shops". KABC-TV. Archived from the original on May 12, 2014.
