= Little India, Malacca =

Ethnic enclave in Malacca, Malaysia

Coordinates: 2°11′48.0″N 102°15′05.9″E

- மலாக்கா லிட்டில் இந்தியா 马六甲小印度
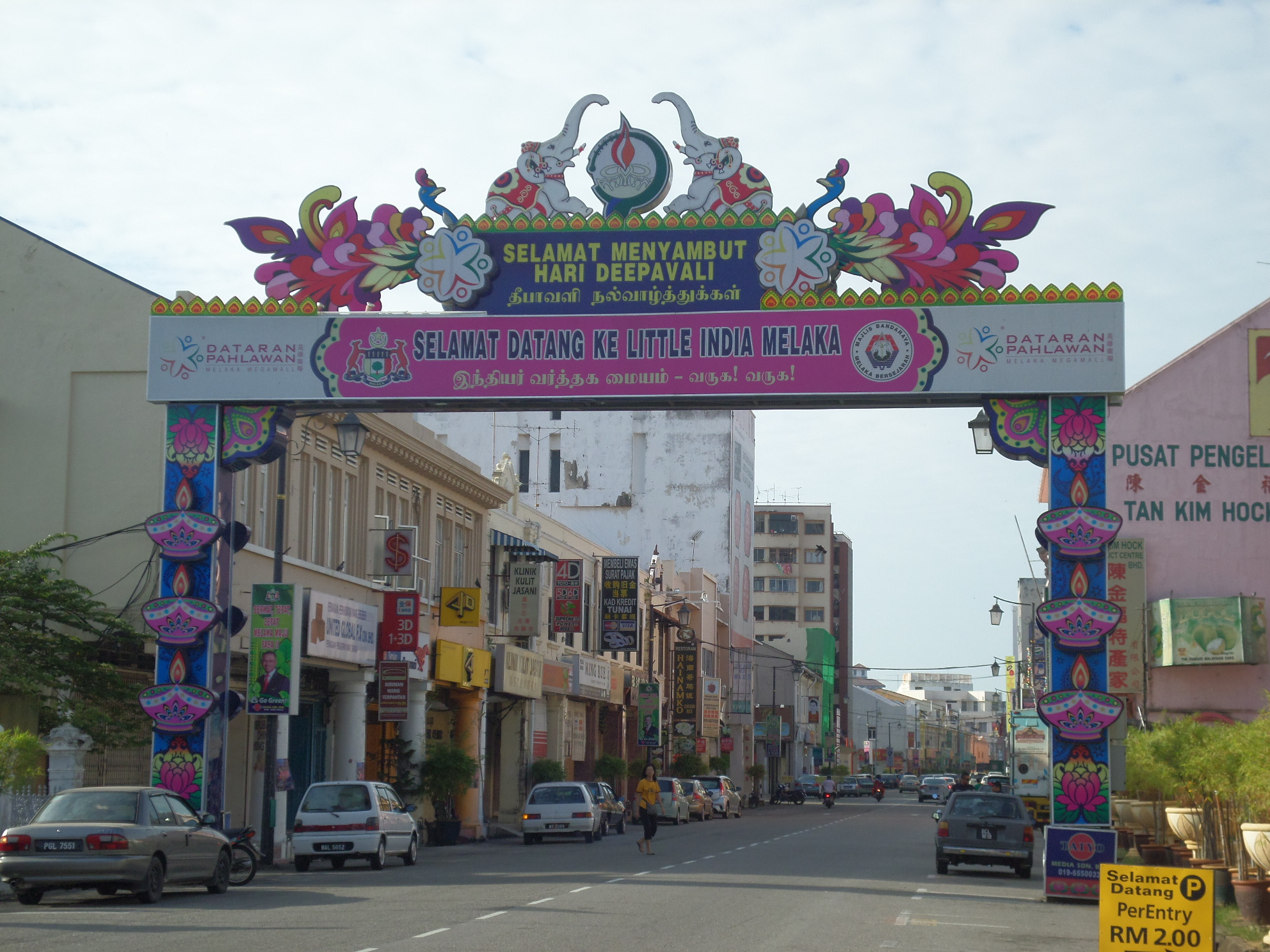
- Interactive map of the Little India, Malacca area

General information
- Location: Malacca City, Malacca, Malaysia

Little India Malacca is a Little India in Malacca City, Malacca, Malaysia.

== History ==
Littleton Pipe Wolferstan was the British Governor of Malacca in the 1910s. A road in Malacca was named after him. Its name is Ulberston Road. Its current name has been changed to Jalan Bendahara. It is on this road that Malacca Little India is located.

=== St. Peter's Church ===
St. Peter's Church is located at the intersection of Malacca Little India Road and Park Raya Road. The oldest in Malaysia. The Dutch demolished the temple already built by the Portuguese.

Later renovation was done in 1710. During the Japanese (Kempeitai) period, the temple was called Karunkugai.

== Architecture ==
The area consists of rows of shop houses dominated by Indian traders along Bendahara Street and its intersection with Temenggong Street.

== Business ==
Most of the traders sell clothing, goods, foods, prayer equipment and flowers.

== See also ==
- List of tourist attractions in Malacca
- Malaysian Indian
