= Paya Besar, Kedah =

Coordinates: 3°28′N 102°01′E

Paya Besar பாயா பெசார்
- ethnic enclave
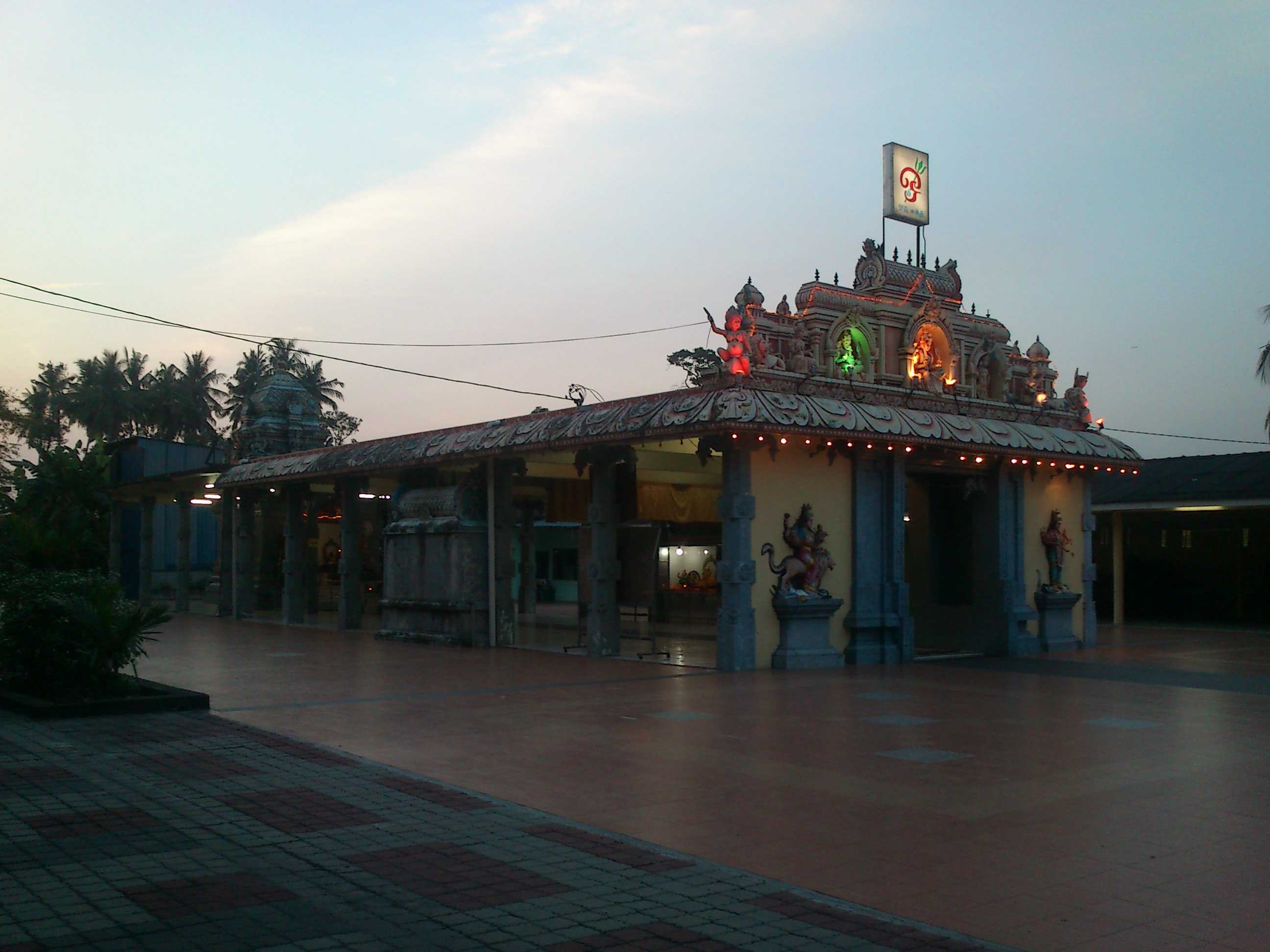
- Arulmigu Annai Karumariamman Temple in Paya Besar
- Interactive map of Paya Besar
- Country: Malaysia
- State: Kedah
- Districts: Kulim

Government
  - Local Authority: City Hall Of Kulim
- Time zone: UTC+8 (MST)
- Postal code: 10000
- Dialling code: +60 4

Paya Besar serves as the state assembly district and the Parliament Constituency of Padang Serai, Kedah. It is also well known as Kulim Little India.

== School ==
The local schools are Smk Paya Besar, Sk Paya Besar and SJKT KoSarangapany.

=== Temples and churches ===
- Dhyana Ashram
- Arulmigu Annai Karumariamman Temple
