= Swaminarayan Akshardham (Robbinsville) =

Hindu temple complex in New Jersey

- Aerial view of Swaminarayan Akshardham in Robbinsville

Religion
- Affiliation: Hinduism
- Deity: Swaminarayan, Radha Krishna, Venkateshwara-Padmavathi, Sita-Rama Lakshman Hanuman, Shiva-Parvati Kartikeya Ganesha

Location
- Location: Robbinsville, Mercer County, New Jersey, U.S.
- Interactive map of Swaminarayan Akshardham
- Coordinates: 40°15′15″N 74°34′40″W

Architecture
- Type: Vastu Shastra; Pancharatra Shastra
- Creator: Pramukh Swami Maharaj; Mahant Swami Maharaj
- Inscriptions: Spiritual-Cultural Complex

Website
- usa.akshardham.org

BAPS Swaminarayan Akshardham in Robbinsville, New Jersey is a large Hindu mandir (temple) built between 2015 and 2023 by the BAPS Swaminarayan Sanstha, which venerates Swaminarayan (1781–1830) as the highest manifestation of Purushottama (Vishnu). It is by a significant margin the largest Hindu mandir in the Western Hemisphere, and the second-largest in the world. (Note: Measures: The mandir is 191 ft (58 m) in height, 255 ft (78 m) in length, and 345 ft (105 m) in width.; The central shikhar (spire) is 213 ft (65 m) above ground.; Atop the central shikhar is a 12 ft (3.7 m) high kalash.; The foundational base is 20 ft (6.1 m) high.; The main outer wall of the mandir is 23 ft (7.0 m) high and 1,120 ft (340 m) long.; The Akshardham mandir has the largest constructed elliptical dome of a traditional stone mandir.)

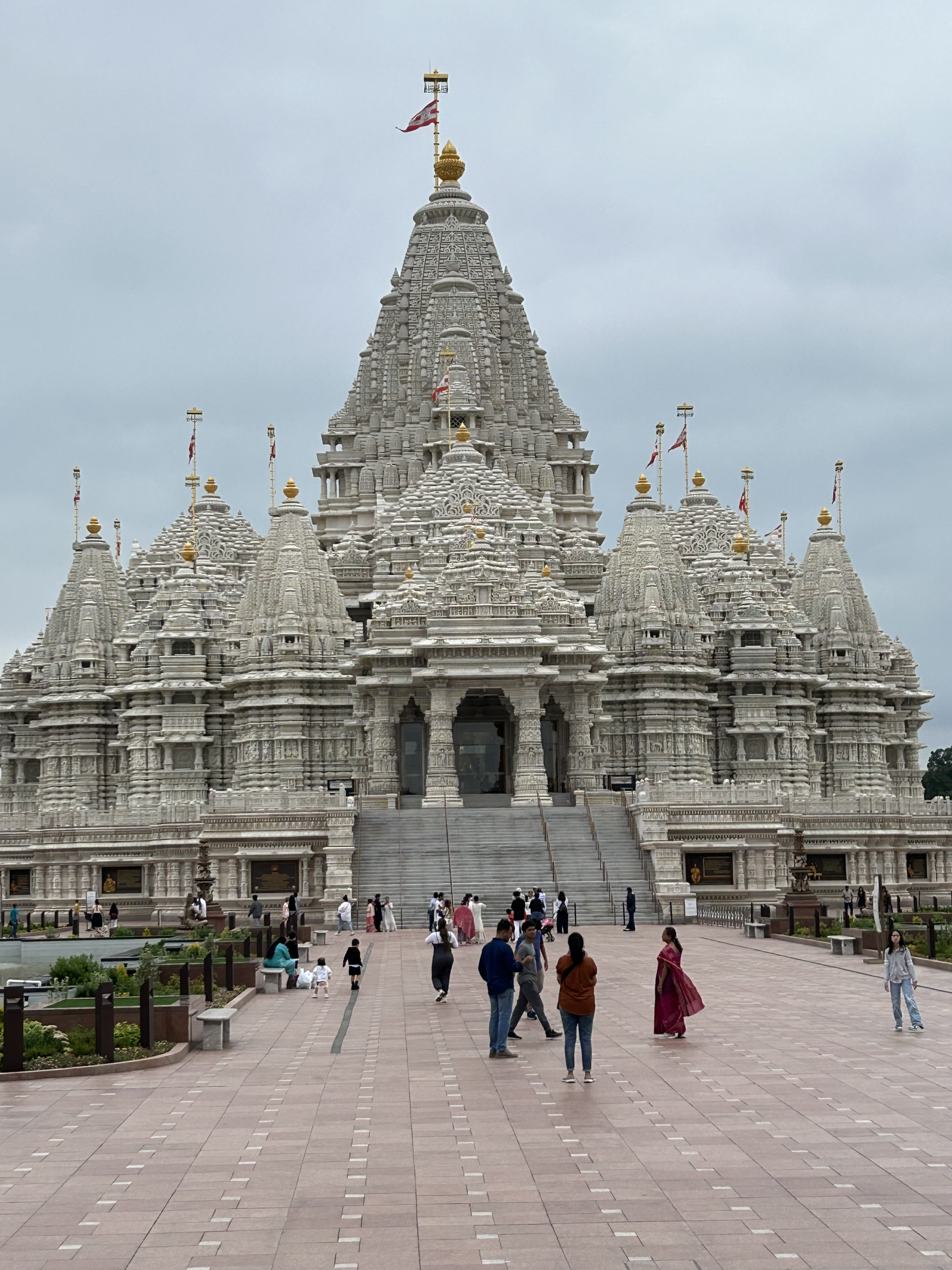
The Grand Centerpiece

The central shrine is dedicated to its founders Swaminarayan and Gunatitanand Swami, worshiped together as Akshar Purushottam Maharaj (supreme God). The Akshardham was initiated by BAPS's fifth spiritual leader, Pramukh Swami Maharaj, and is one of the three Akshardham mandirs constructed by the BAPS Swaminarayan Sanstha; the other two are in New Delhi and Gandhinagar in India.

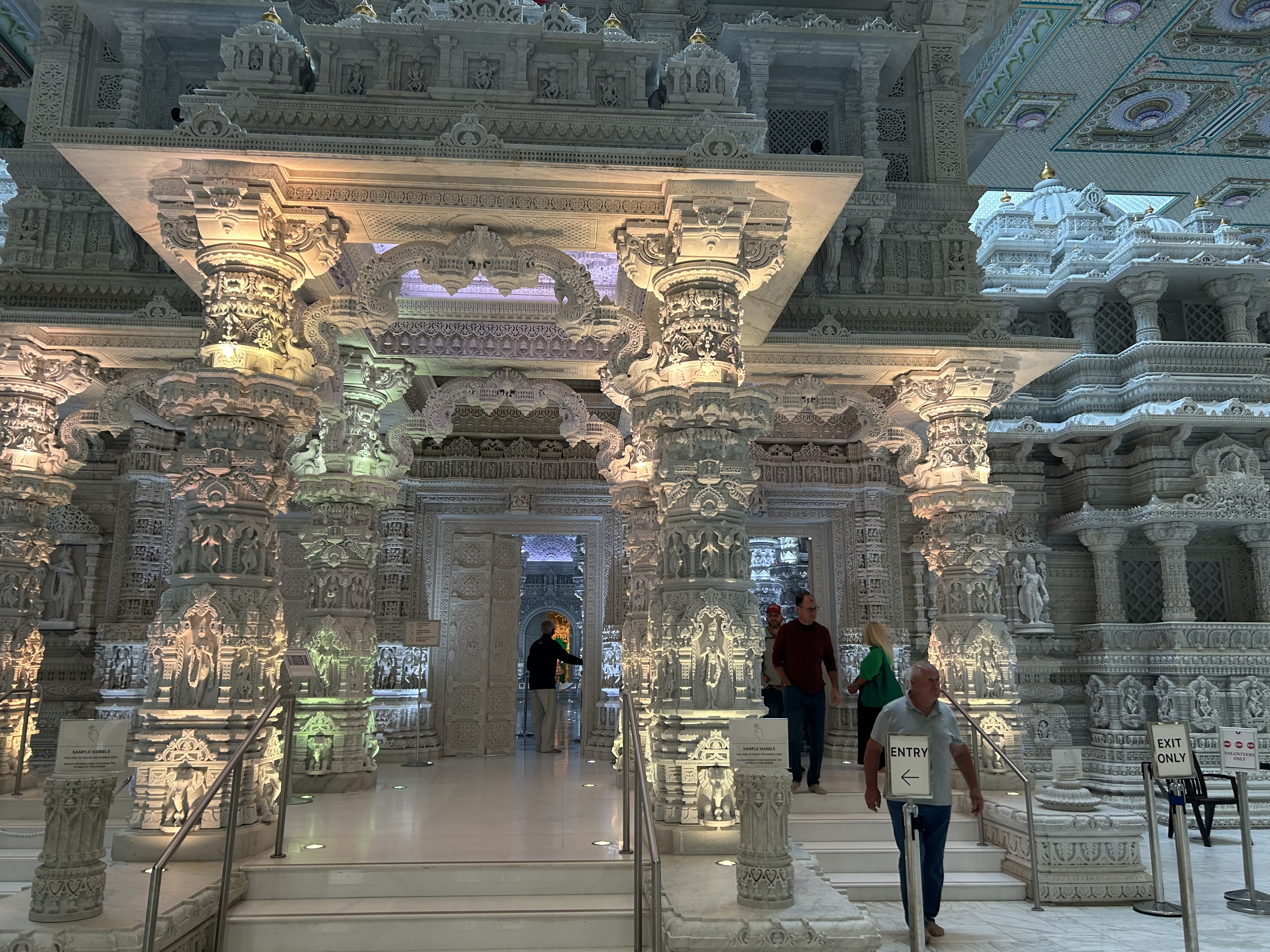
Traditional Hindu Mandir

The Akshardham campus also contains the BAPS Shri Swaminarayan Mandir (Robbinsville, New Jersey), a smaller traditional shikharbaddha mandir built between 2010 and 2014; and further Nilkanth Plaza, a welcome center, a vegetarian cafe, the BAPS Swaminarayan Research Institute, a museum, and an event center.

In May 2021, a lawsuit was filed against BAPS by several artisans from India who were involved in the construction, alleging that the temple administrators violated labor laws. The lawsuit alleged that over 200 Indian men, mostly of the Dalit caste, were brought from India to the US and were subject to wage theft, forced labor, and human trafficking. A BAPS spokesperson denied these allegations, stating that the artisans had come to the US as religious volunteers as part of their devotion, not as employees. By July 2023, 12 of the plaintiffs had withdrawn from the lawsuit citing religious conviction. In September 2025, the Department of Justice closed its criminal investigation without bringing charges, allowing the civil case to resume.

== History ==
=== Initiation and construction ===
The Akshardham campus was initiated by BAPS' fifth spiritual leader, Pramukh Swami Maharaj, in 1984. His vision was to create a place of worship in North America for followers that could also enable visitors of different backgrounds to experience Hindu spirituality, architecture, and peace. The land was purchased in 2008. On October 6, 2011, Pramukh Swami Maharaj performed the rituals sanctifying the foundation stones (shilanyas pujan) in Mumbai.

On 15 August 2014, during his final visit to the United States, following the inauguration of the BAPS Shri Swaminarayan mandir in Robbinsville, (the shikharbaddha mandir on the Akshardham campus), Pramukh Swami Maharaj performed the groundbreaking rituals to the areas where the deities would be installed in the Akshardham mandir. Construction of the Akshardham mandir began in 2015. The first marble pillar installation ceremony took place on September 4, 2017, in the presence of Mahant Swami Maharaj, the sixth spiritual leader of BAPS.

In the summer of 2020, the mandovar (the main outer wall of the mandir) was completed. The keystones of each of the four domes, which locks a dome in place, were installed on June 14, 2022. The base of the outer wall, or the jagati peeth, was completed in July 2022. On May 31, 2023, the final stone of the Akshardham mandir was installed.

About 75% of the Akshardham campus is designed, constructed, managed, and maintained by swamis and volunteers. Between 2011 and 2023, over 12,500 people volunteered to build the mandir. Volunteers carved and installed about 2,000,000 cubic feet (57,000 m^{3}) of stone. The volunteers came from various backgrounds which included students, business executives, physicians, and architects. Volunteers who did not have prior stone mandir construction experience received training on mandir architecture and construction by experts.

=== Inauguration ===
From July 2023, BAPS hosted a three-month-long celebration called the "Festival of Inspirations" leading up to its inauguration. During the celebrations, BAPS launched various community programs, including a 10-week-long blood drive and the Days of Giving campaign. The 10-week blood drive had over 4,470 donors and was recognized as one of the longest-running blood drives in the state. The Days of Giving initiative donated over 12,000 school supplies, hygiene essentials, and food items to the local community. A "My Country, My Duty" program celebrated police and law enforcement throughout the country. The inaugural celebration also included a three-month-long Vedic Mahayagna to invoke peace around the world through ancient rituals.

=== Akshardham Mahotsav ===
The inaugural ceremony, called the Akshardham Mahotsav, was split over nine days (September 20 - October 8, 2023). Each day celebrated aspects of the mandir or the values it represents. Daily themes included celebrating Indian culture, non-violence, women's contributions to society, interfaith harmony, and community day. On October 5, 2023, Robbinsville Mayor, David Fried, joined the community unity day program and said, "Every time I reached out to BAPS, they never failed to answer the call, and for that, I'm incredibly grateful." During the program, Fried and Mayor John Higdom from Matthews, North Carolina, both offered the "Key to the City" to Mahant Swami Maharaj.

On October 8, 2023, Mahant Swami Maharaj performed the consecration ceremony and formally inaugurated the mandir. The inauguration was joined by Delaware Governor John Carney and Congressman Steny Hoyer. Carney said, "I was struck by what Swami said that the temple is a bridge, a bridge from the past to the future; a bridge from one community to the next. It is an incredible place of devotion." Additionally, UK Prime Minister Rishi Sunak and Indian Prime Minister Narendra Modi extended wishes for the inauguration of the mandir. Sunak stated, "We were amazed and awed by the beauty of this temple and its universal message of peace, harmony, and becoming a better human being. This is not only a place of worship, but a landmark that also portrays India's values, culture, and contributions to the world.

== Design and construction ==
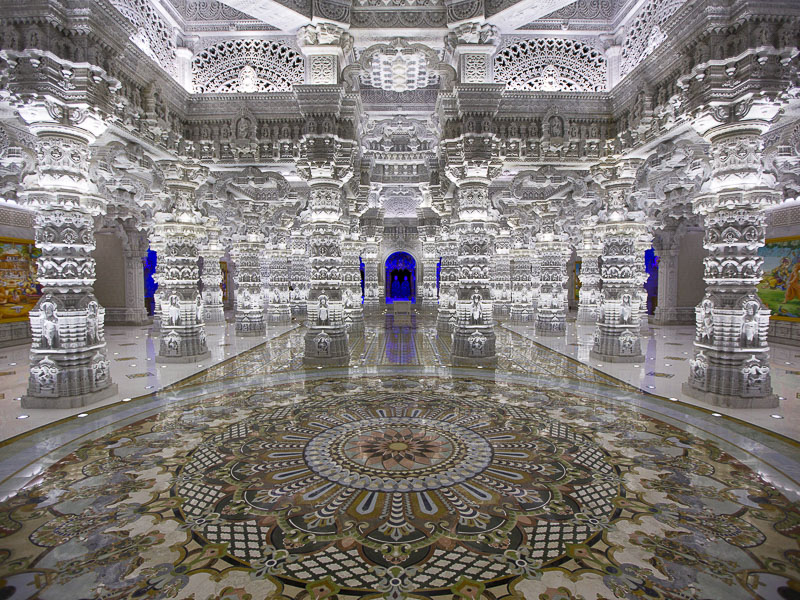
BAPS Robbinsville Mandir Interior

The Akshardham mandir was designed in accordance with ancient Hindu scriptures and features elements from Hindu heritage. It is the largest Hindu mandir in the United States and the second largest Hindu mandir in the world.

=== Architecture ===
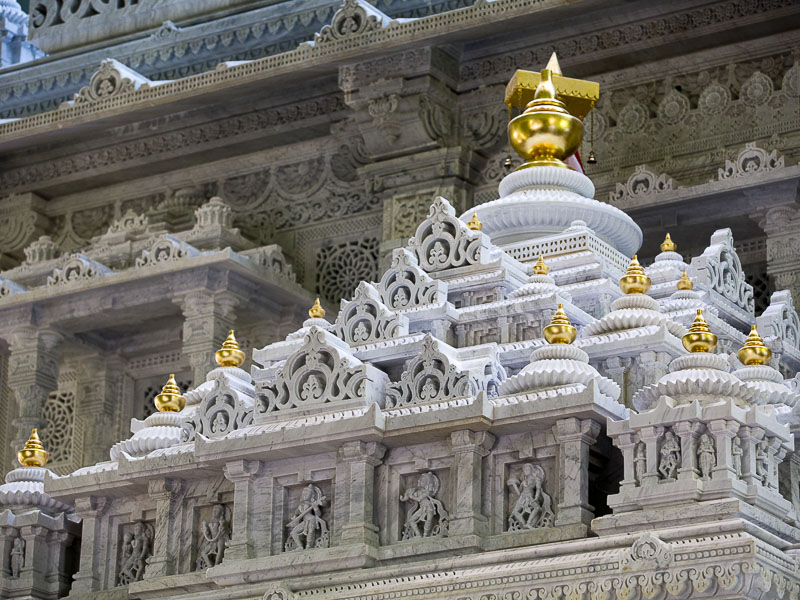
A close-up of the exterior classical Hindu temple architecture

The foundational base, or the jagati, is made of a 13-tiered structure of limestone, and is also referred to as the Wisdom Plinth because it conveys messages of wisdom from ancient Indian scriptures, scholars, and other world luminaries.

Above the foundational base plinth is the main outer wall of the mandir, called the mandovar, made of Bulgarian and Turkish limestone. The mandovar includes carvings of poets, philosophers, and sages. It also has 151 statues holding different musical instruments that originated in India.

The Akshardham has nine shikhars ("mountain peak," that is, a rising tower) and nine samarans (pyramidal domes) atop of the mandir. Symbolically, the shikhars are a visual metaphor for reaching spiritual enlightenment. A 120 ft (37 m) mahashikhar made up of 35 layers represents the pursuit of a higher truth and connecting with a higher being.

There are four main domes within the mandir called Parabrahma, Aksharbrahma, Mukta and Aishwarya Mandapam. The Parabrahma Mandapam houses the sanctum sanctorum or garbhagriha dedicated to Swaminarayan and it is 65 ft (20 m) tall and 36 ft (11 m) wide. The Aksharbrahma Mandapam honors Swaminarayan's first spiritual successor Gunatitanand Swami. The mandapam has his life stories carved out on pillars and also includes different symbols and motifs that depict his various qualities. The Mukta Mandapam honors followers of the faith, called muktas or liberated souls, that excelled on the spiritual path. The pillars in this mandapam have 48 statues of muktas carved out of marble, engaged in worship and service of God. The Aishwarya Mandapam honors various divinities in Hinduism as well as acharyas, kings, saints and renowned poets. Individuals include Shabari, Vidura, Veda Vyas, Tulsidas, Shankaracharya, Chaitanya Mahaprabhu, Bhagiratha and Mirabai.

The mandir houses more than 10,000 statues, statuettes, and carved motifs of Indian music and dance forms. Carvings of all 108 Bharatanatyam poses, an ancient Hindu dance form, are depicted throughout the mandir for the first time in one structure. There are 548 intricately carved marble pillars, or stambhas, in the Akshardham mandir and 200 are on the main floor. Some of the pillars are dedicated to sacred scriptures found in Hinduism such as the Upanishads, Ramayana, Mahabharata and Bhagavata Purana and the pillars include carvings of different stories from those scriptures.

Two rectangular ponds in front of the mandir include four statues representing the four Vedas. The mandir is surrounded by a 2,485 ft (757 m) long colonnade, or parikrama, made from red sandstone. It is 42 ft (13 m) high and 15 ft (4.6 m) wide. Its shape represents a garland and symbolizes reverence for the mandir.

=== Building material ===
Different types of stone have been used throughout the campus for different purposes. The mandir was constructed from different types of stone including marble from Greece, Turkey, and Italy; pink sandstone from Rajasthan; granite from India; and limestone from Bulgaria and Turkey.

Limestone is durable and naturally water and weather resistant. Bulgarian and Turkish limestone have been used for the exterior, which includes shikhars, samarans, mandovar and the jagati. Sandstone has been widely used in traditional Hindu temple architecture across India for its durability and suitability for intricate carvings. For this reason, red-hued sandstone from Bansi Paharpur in Rajasthan, India is used for the parikrama. Due to granite's durability, hardiness and diverse range of colors it has been used throughout the campus' walking paths such as Nilkanth Plaza, parikrama, and jagati. It is also used in the basement of the Akshardham mandir to protect it from weather.

Stones quarried from Europe were shipped to India and carved in Pindwara, Rajasthan. The carved stones and pillars were then assembled through a process called dry setting, where mortar and cement is not used, to determine how the structure would look before final placement in Robbinsville. After which, each carved structure was disassembled, coded and sent for shipment to Robbinsville, traveling 12,500 mi (20,100 km). In Robbinsville, the stones were reassembled into the Akshardham mandir by trained volunteers.

=== Sustainability ===
During its construction, BAPS also incorporated sustainable practices by utilizing a fly ash concrete mix, planting over two million trees worldwide over several decades, and building a six-acre (24,000 m^{2}) solar farm that supplies electricity to the Akshardham campus.

=== Deities ===
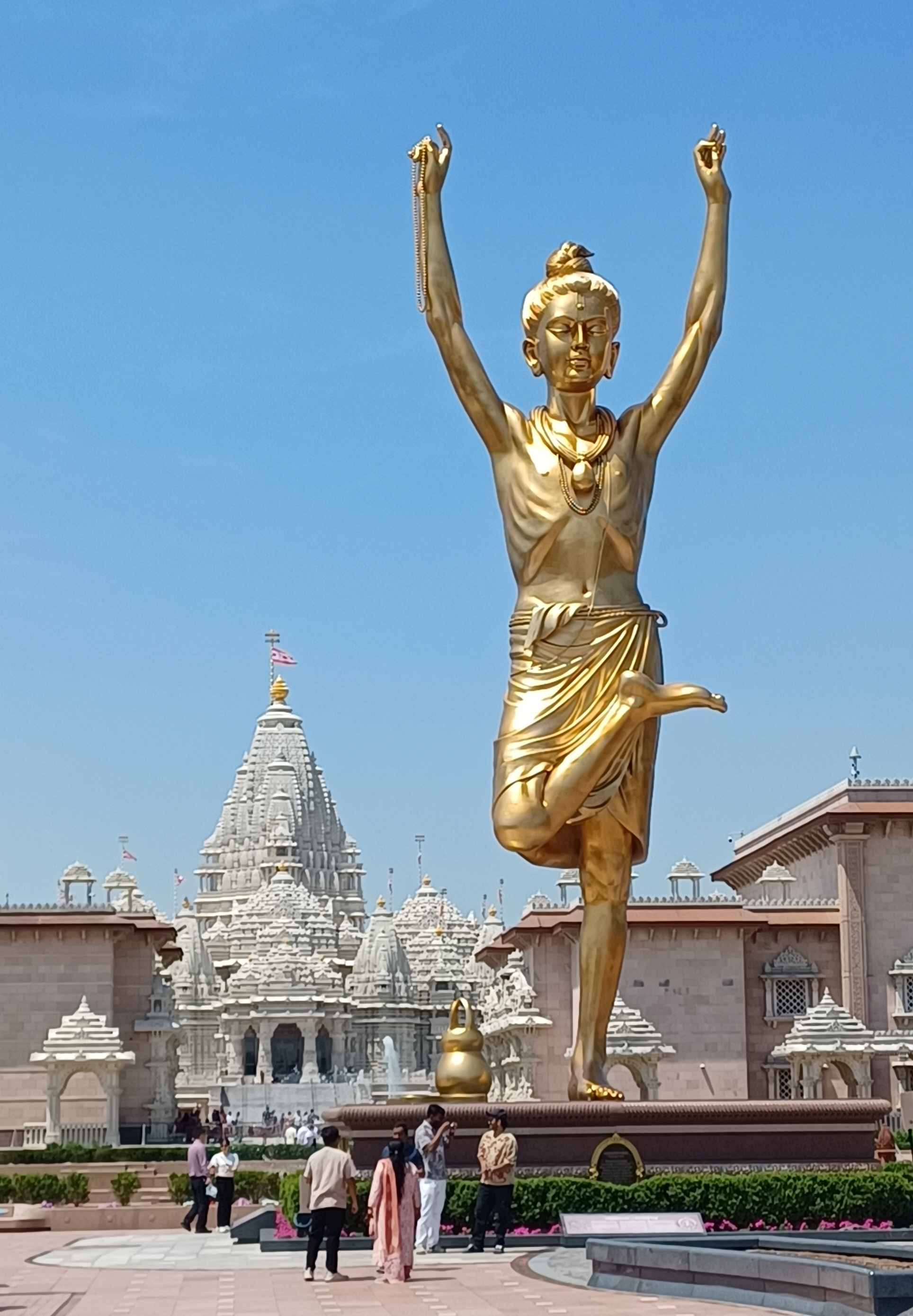
Statue of Nilkanth Varni

The mandir has 13 shrines dedicated to various Hindu deities. The central shrine (garbhagriha) is dedicated to Swaminarayan and Gunatitanand Swami, worshipped together as Akshar Purushottam Maharaj. The sacred image of Swaminarayan is 15.5 ft (4.7 m) tall and is crafted from panchdhatu (an alloy of five metals - gold, silver, copper, zinc, and iron). Its sinhasan (throne) is adorned with intricate designs, including two swans and elephants.

The other 12 shrines display the sacred images of Hindu deities including Radha-Krishna, Venkateshwara-Padmavati, Sita-Rama, Lakshman, Hanuman, Shiva-Parvati, Ganesha, and Kartikeya, as well as Swaminarayan's spiritual successors.

In four of the shrines, sacred images are installed depicting important events from Swaminarayan's life. These include, sacred images of Ghanshyam (Swaminaryan's child form) with his parents and friends, Nilkanth Varni (Swaminarayan's teenage form) engaged in austerity in the Himalayas, Sahajanand Swami (Swaminarayan as leader) requesting a boon from Ramanand Swami, and Swaminarayan applying a tilak to Gunatitanand Swami, symbolizing him as his spiritual successor.

== Akshardham campus ==
=== Nilkanth Plaza ===
The entrance to the Akshardham campus begins with the Nilkanth Plaza which has a 49 ft (15 m) tall bronze sacred image, or murti, of Nilkanth Varni, the teenage form of Swaminarayan. The height commemorates Swaminarayan's 49 years on Earth. Nilkanth Varni began a spiritual journey across India at the age of eleven, which lasted seven years and covered 8,000 miles (12,000 km). During his travels in the Himalayas, he attained proficiency in yoga, and he practiced rigorous austerities for six months, standing on one leg in a yogic stance. Swaminarayan is thus depicted as Nilkanth Varni in a yogic posture, practicing self-discipline and devotion. The area also includes ten pink stone shrines, a map illustrating Nilkanth's seven-year journey, and fourteen stone tablets that highlight aspects of his personality and teachings of faith, service, forgiveness, and compassion.

=== Brahma Kund ===
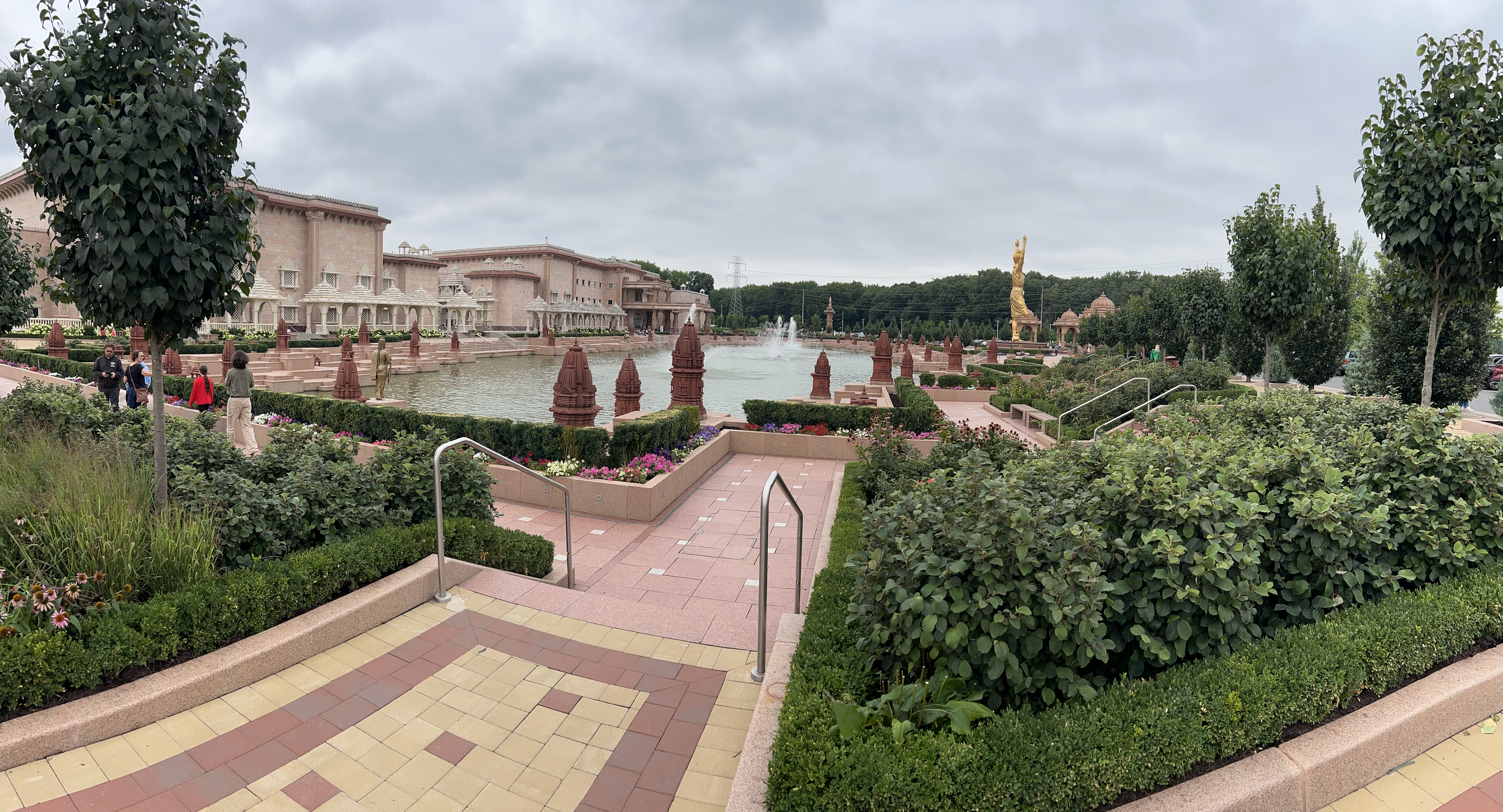
Brahma Kund

The campus has a traditional Indian stepwell, called the Brahma Kund, which contains sanctified water from over 300 sources including 108 holy rivers in India and rivers that flow across the United States. The four sides of the pond contain the murtis of Ganga, Yamuna, Sarasvati, and Sarayu. There are 48 pink stone shikhars and 24 shrines surrounding the Brahma Kund.

=== Shikarbaddha mandir ===
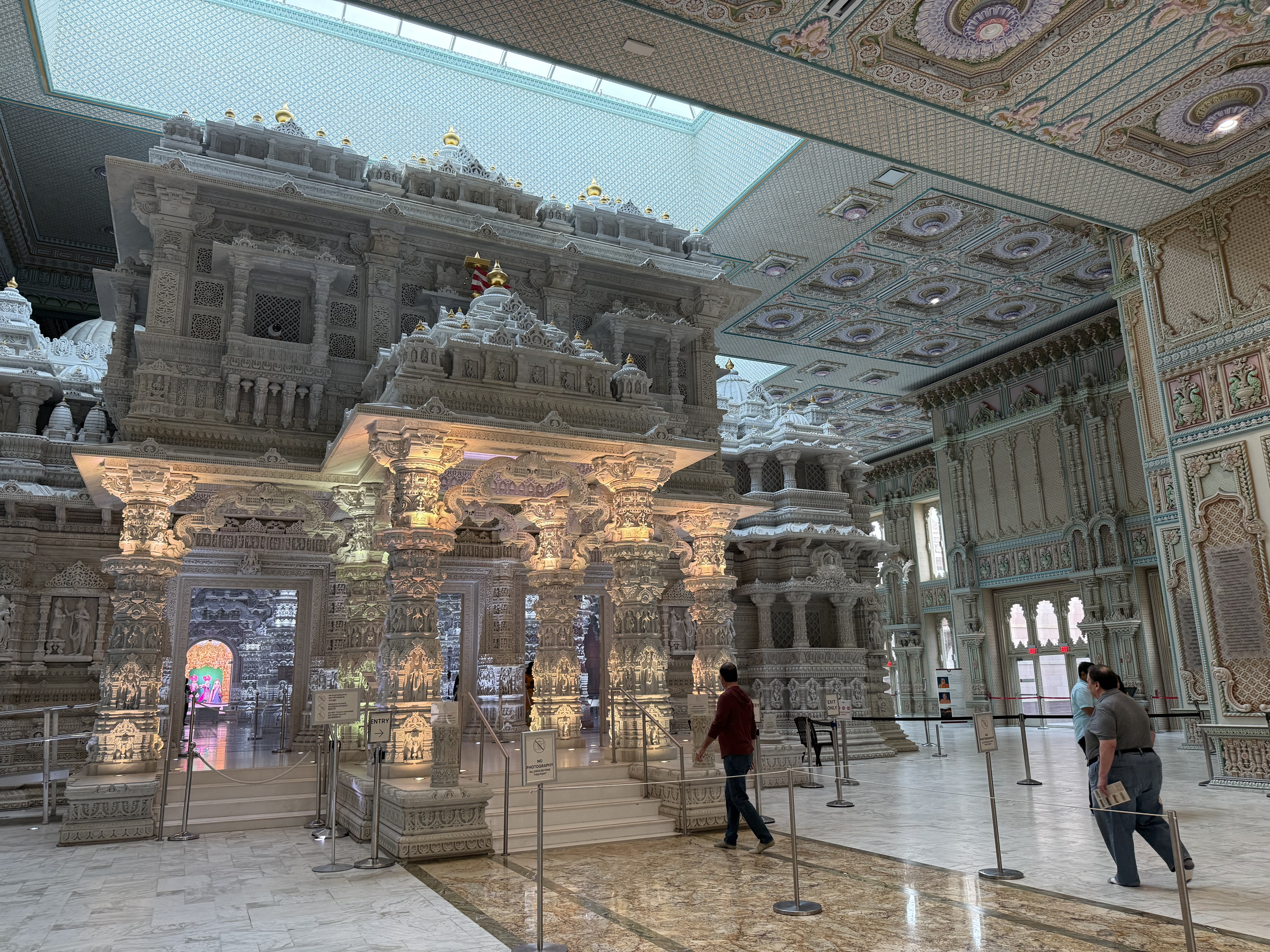
A place of serenity. The older smaller Mandir

The BAPS Shri Swaminarayan Mandir (Robbinsville, New Jersey) is a slightly older, smaller mandir on the Akshardham campus, built between 2010 and 2014. The mandir was built in the Nagaradi style using 68,000 cubic feet (1,900 m^{3}) of Italian Carrara marble. The structure is 87 feet (27 m) wide, 133 feet (41 m) long, and 42 feet (13 m) high. The mandir was officially opened to the public on August 10, 2014, after the murtis were consecrated in the presence of Pramukh Swami Maharaj.

=== Welcome Center ===
The Welcome Center is designed according to Indian Haveli-style architecture to welcome guests in a traditional manner. It is made from hand-carved Burmese Teak wood. There are 2,700 lanterns inside the welcome center to commemorate Diwali, the Hindu festival of light. It also includes Indian design motifs on the walls. Three orientation theaters play a short video on Hinduism and Swaminarayan Akshardham. The Welcome Center connects to a vegetarian cafe called Shayona Cafe. The Shayona Cafe serves items prepared according to the core Hindu spiritual principles of ahimsa (non-violence) and a sattvik diet, with the aim of promoting physical, mental, and spiritual wellness.

=== BAPS Swaminarayan Research Institute ===
On June 18, 2022, the BAPS Swaminarayan Research Institute was inaugurated by Mahamahopadhyaya Pujya Bhadreshdas Swami, author of the Sanskrit commentarial and philosophical texts, the Swaminarayan Bhashyam and the Swaminarayan Siddhanta Sudda, in the presence of representatives from over 50 Hindu mandirs and organizations. Bhadreshdas Swami delivered the inaugural speech which encouraged the community to explore Hindu philosophy and the arts, and spoke about Mahant Swami Maharaj's messages, that Hindu scholarship would foster global harmony, public service, and educational excellence.

== Lawsuit ==
In May 2021, a lawsuit was filed against BAPS by several volunteer artisans from India who were involved in the construction alleging that the temple administrators violated labor laws. In relation to this, the Federal Bureau of Investigation, Department of Labor, and Department of Homeland Security visited the site on "court-authorized law enforcement activity." The lawsuit alleges that over 200 Indian men, mostly of the Dalit caste, were brought from India to the US and were subject to forced labor, human trafficking and were paid $1 an hour for their work.

As of July 2023, 12 of the plaintiffs have withdrawn from the lawsuit. Aaditya Soni, their lawyer, stated that the plaintiffs believed the facts of the case were false and cited religious convictions as the basis for their withdrawal. Some news outlets characterized the trial as raising questions about the ability of US labor laws to account for certain forms of religious volunteerism.

In a letter dated September 18, 2025, Paul J. Fishman, an attorney for BAPS, informed the U.S. District Court for the District of New Jersey that the Department of Justice had closed its criminal investigation without bringing charges, allowing the civil case, which had been paused during that investigation, to resume. The suit alleges violations of the Trafficking Victims Protection Act, the Fair Labor Standards Act, and other federal and state law.

In April 2026, The Guardian reported that workers alleged abuse, visa fraud, and medical neglect during the temple's construction between 2015 and 2023. Speaking anonymously and citing fear of retaliation, workers said they believed that at least two laborers, Ramesh Meena and Devi Lal, had died of silicosis, an incurable lung disease caused by inhaling the silica dust released when stone is carved, and that others had been diagnosed with tuberculosis and chronic bronchitis. Workers said they had been issued surgical or cloth masks rather than the N95 respirators that the Occupational Safety and Health Administration specifies as a minimum for prolonged silica exposure, and that those who became ill were sent back to India. Darshan Patel, a media representative for BAPS, said the allegations were "wrong", that the artisans' presence had been "well known to and approved by federal, state and local officials", and that BAPS had provided inspected housing, meals, round-trip flights, medical care, health insurance, and unmonitored internet access. BAPS has asserted the ministerial exception, a First Amendment doctrine that limits judicial review of religious organizations' employment decisions.

== See also ==
- Swaminarayan Akshardham (Delhi)
- Swaminarayan Akshardham (Gandhinagar)
