= BAPS Shri Swaminarayan Mandir (Robbinsville) =

BAPS Shri Swaminarayan Mandir Robbinsville
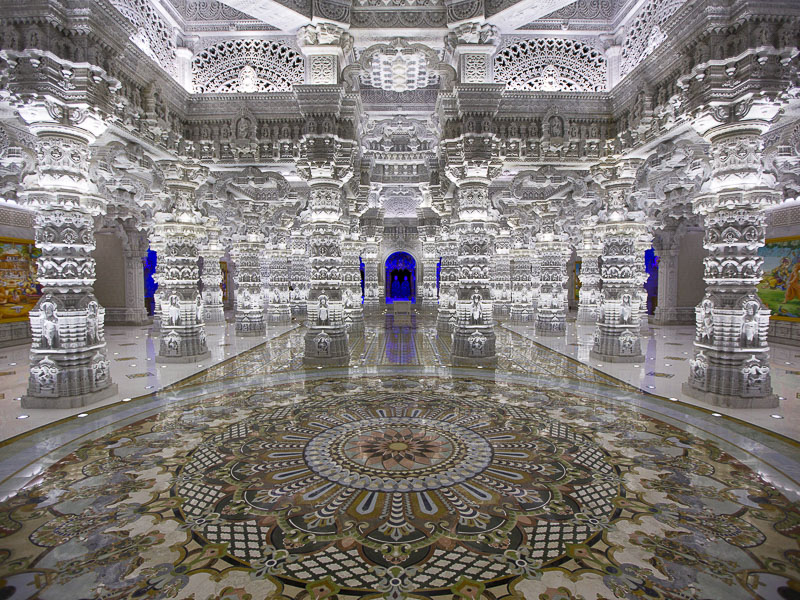

Religion
- Affiliation: Hinduism
- Deity: Swaminarayan, Radha Krishna, Sita-Rama Hanuman, Shiva-Parvati Ganesha

Location
- Location: Robbinsville, Mercer County, New Jersey, U.S.
- Interactive map of BAPS Shri Swaminarayan Mandir Robbinsville
- Coordinates: 40°15′15″N 74°34′40″W

Architecture
- Type: Shilpa Shastras
- Creator: Pramukh Swami Maharaj

The BAPS Shri Swaminarayan Mandir is a Hindu shikharbaddha mandir in Robbinsville, New Jersey that was built between 2010 and 2014. It is part of the Akshardham complex of the BAPS Swaminarayan Sanstha, a denomination of the Swaminarayan branch of Hinduism. The complex also contains the Swaminarayan Akshardham (Robbinsville, New Jersey), which was built between 2015 and 2023.

== Construction ==
The BAPS Shri Swaminarayan Mandir in Robbinsville, New Jersey was first proposed by Pramukh Swami Maharaj in 1997 as a part of Swaminarayan Akshardham in North America.

The mandir's construction commenced in 2010. The mandir was constructed according to Vedic guidelines in the Nagaradi style, using 68,000 cubic feet (1,900 m^{3}) of Italian Carrara marble, Indian pink stone, and limestone. The marble obtained from quarries in Europe was shipped to Rajasthan, India where hundreds of artisans carved the stones. After the finished pieces of stone were assembled in workshops, engineers sequentially numbered the pieces and shipped them to Robbinsville. Upon their arrival, the pieces were organized using the numbering system to facilitate the mandir's construction.

A decorative mandap, or enclosure, was built around the mandir to shield it from harsh weather and facilitate its year-round use. The structure is 87 feet (27 m) wide, 133 feet (41 m) long, and 42 feet (13 m) high. The entrance to the mandap, called the Mayur Dwar, contains carvings depicting peacocks, elephants, and celebrated Hindu devotees of past eras.

The mandir was constructed primarily through the efforts of artisans and volunteers who collectively provided an estimated 4.7 million human hours. Volunteers engaged in various tasks during the construction process, including design and engineering, carving coordination & stone shipping, site preparation, lighting and electrical wiring, polishing, cleaning the assembled marble, tent-building, meal preparation, and offering medical services.

== Opening ==
The mandir was officially opened to the public on August 10, 2014, after the murtis were consecrated in the presence of Pramukh Swami Maharaj and senior swamis of BAPS. A number of dignitaries were present during the opening ceremony, including New Jersey Senator Cory Booker, Maryland Rep. Steny Hoyer, Pennsylvania Rep. Mike Fitzpatrick, New Jersey Rep. Frank Pallone, New Jersey Attorney General John Jay Hoffman, and Indian Consul General Dnyaneshwar Mulay. The opening was part of a three-day celebration and featured a grand yagna in which participants prayed for world peace and a women's cultural program focused on interfaith harmony. Over 20,000 visitors participated in the various events.

== Mandir and daily rituals ==
The mandir is a shikarbaddha mandir, built according to principles laid out in the Shilpa Shastras, Hindu texts prescribing standards of sacred architecture. Within the mandir, murtis, the sacred images of the deities, have been consecrated. The central shrine holds the murtis of Swaminarayan and Gunatitanand Swami, together worshipped as Akshar-Purushottam Maharaj. Similarly, different shrines hold other murtis, including Radha and Krishna; Shiva and Parvati; Sita and Ram; Hanuman; Ganapati; and the lineage of BAPS gurus who Baps believes to be Swaminarayan's spiritual successors.

According to Hindu beliefs, once the divine has been invoked in a murti, it becomes an embodiment of the Divine. Accordingly, Swaminarayan swamis, or monks, offer devotional worship to the deities throughout the day. Before dawn, they awaken the deities by singing prabhatiya (morning hymns). The deities are then bathed and offered food and garments depending on the time of the day and season. Food that has been offered to the deities is considered sanctified and distributed to the devotees as prasadam. Aarti, a ritual where devotees sing the glory of God while a lighted wick is circulated before the murtis, is performed five times a day and named mangala aarti, shanagar aarti, rajabhoga aarti, sandhya aarti and shayana aarti, respectively. Finally, swamis adorn the murtis with night garments and ask the deities to retire for the night.

== Charitable initiatives ==
Since 2012, BAPS Charities has hosted charitable events at the Robbinsville mandir, such as health fairs and seminars led by volunteer medical professionals. Donations collected from annual walk-a-thons have supported humanitarian causes, like planting 300,000 trees to support the Nature Conservancy's initiative to plant 1 billion trees by 2025.

During the COVID-19 global pandemic, BAPS Charities has provided relief and assistance worldwide. In the first month of the COVID-19 pandemic, 5,500 N95 face masks were donated to Robert Wood Johnson University Hospital in Hamilton and New Brunswick, Capital Health Hospitals, Penn Medicine at Princeton Medical Center and Robbinsville Township and other medical organizations in New Jersey. Over 4,000 hot meals were served to first responders in New York and New Jersey, including Robbinsville Township Police Department and Fire Department and Saint Francis Medical Center. BAPS Charities delivered care packages to seniors in New Jersey. A food drive was also organized to collect non-perishable food items for the Robbinsville Township Food Pantry and NJ Rise.

On April 30, 2021, BAPS Charities hosted a vaccination drive in conjunction with Robert Wood Johnson University Hospital at the mandir. US Surgeon General Vivek Murthy praised BAPS Charities for hosting vaccination clinics at mandirs which increased accessibility for the elderly.

== Gallery ==
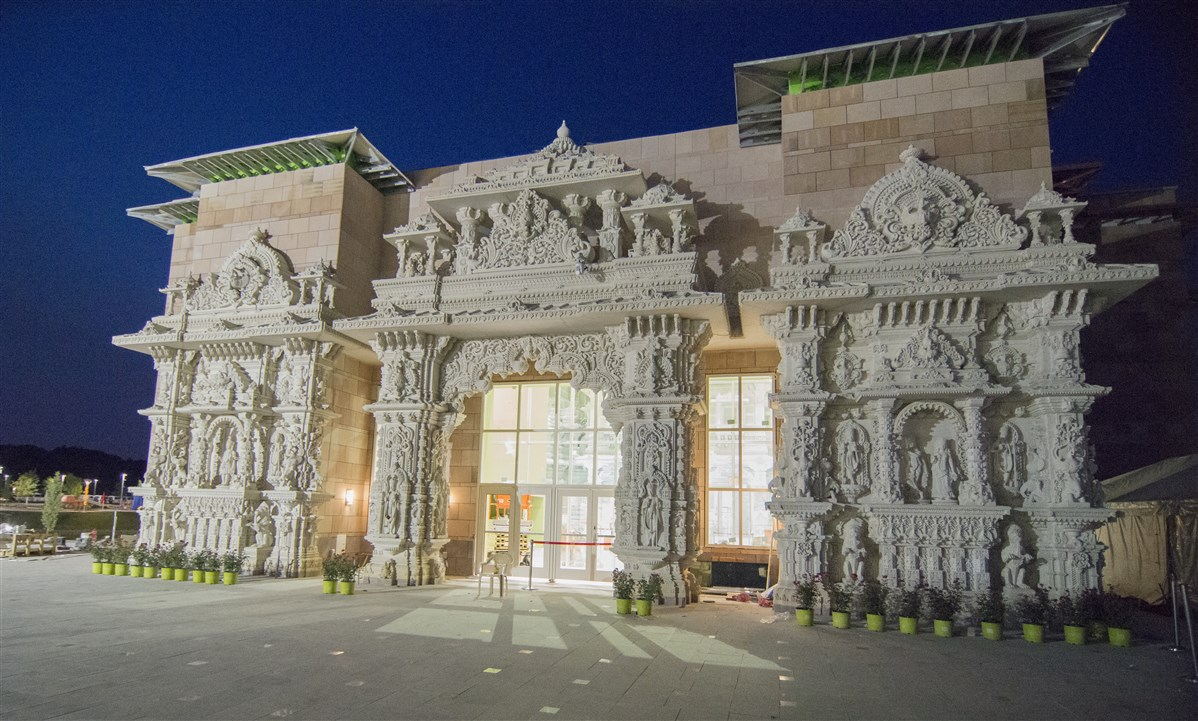
Mandir exterior

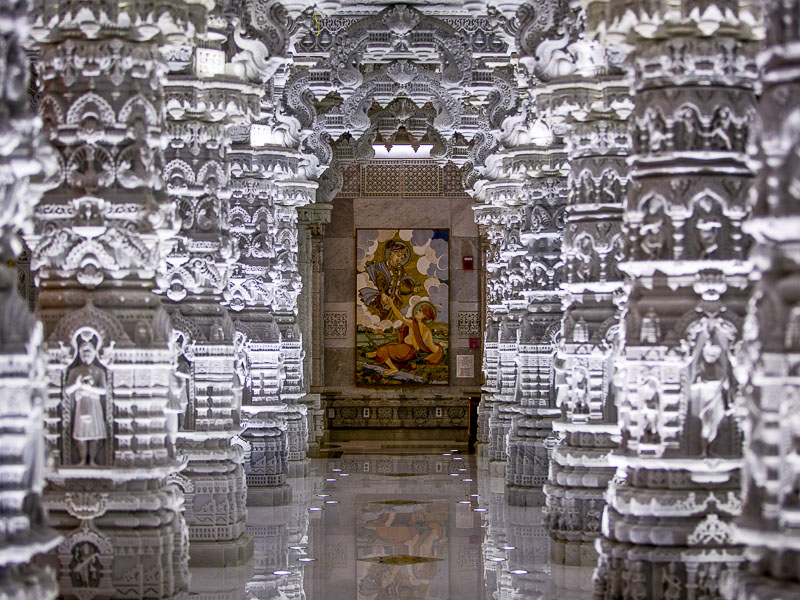
Mandir interior

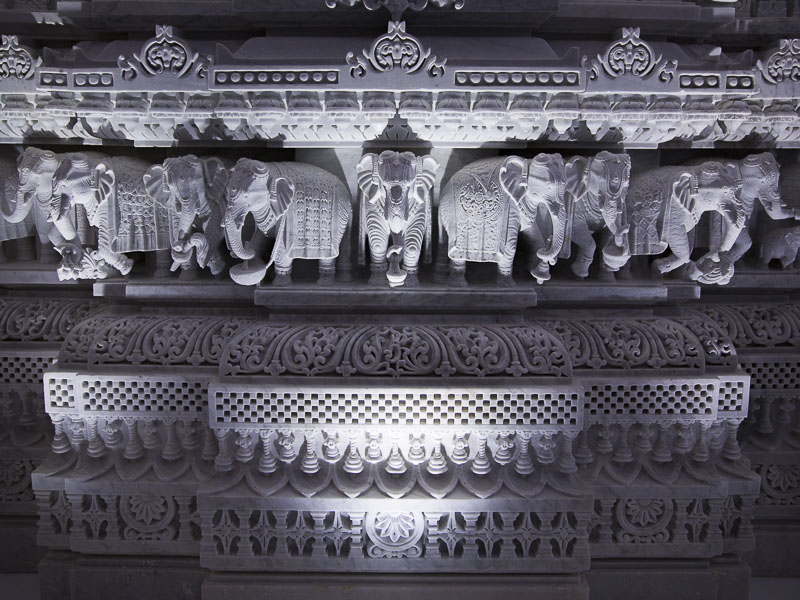
Mandir carving

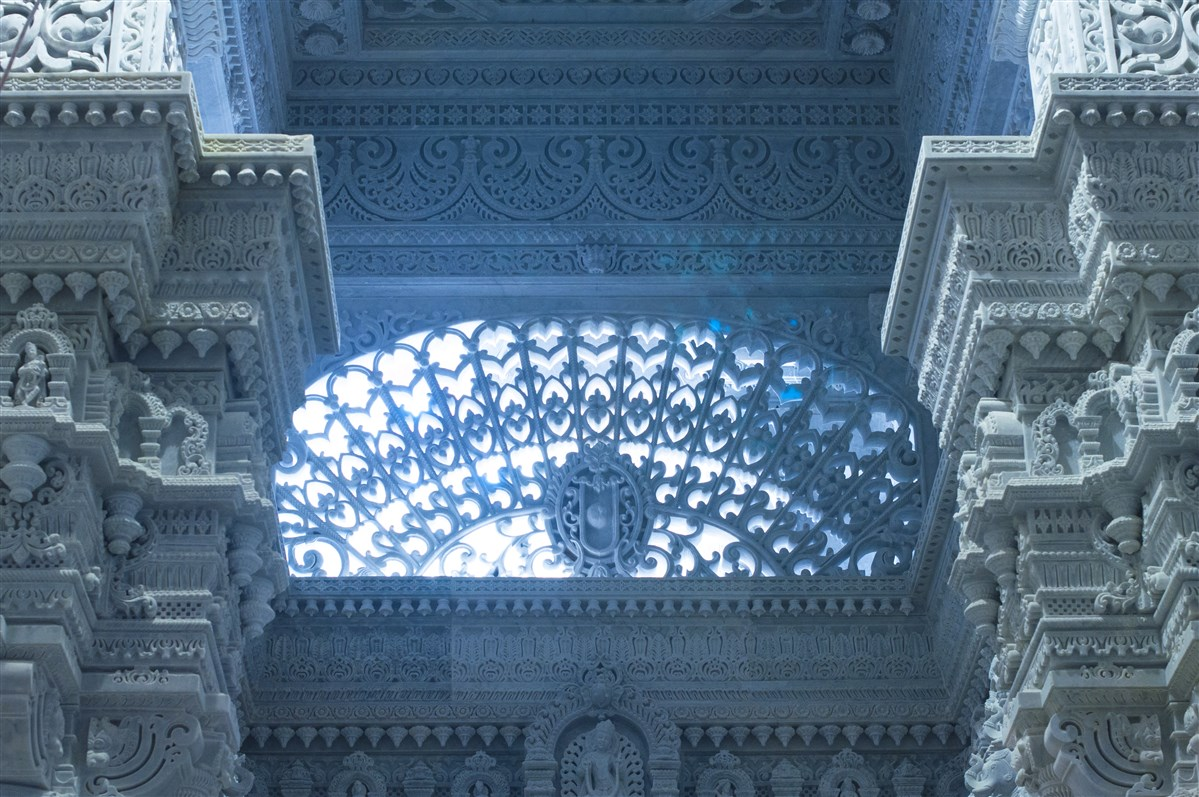
Mandir carved grill

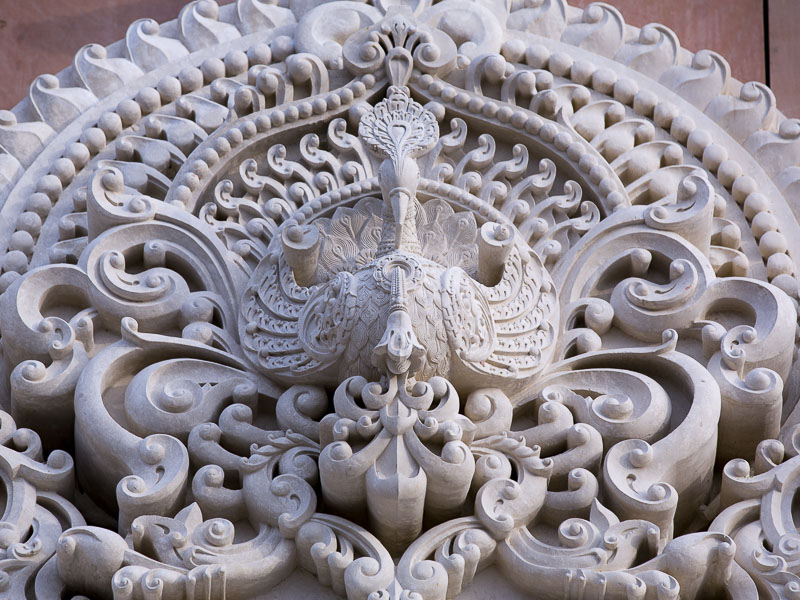
Mandir carving

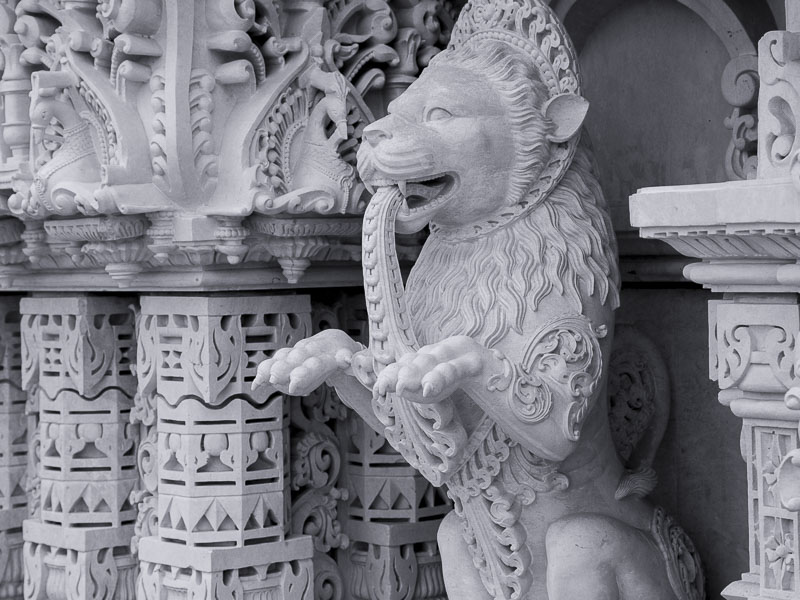
Mandir carving

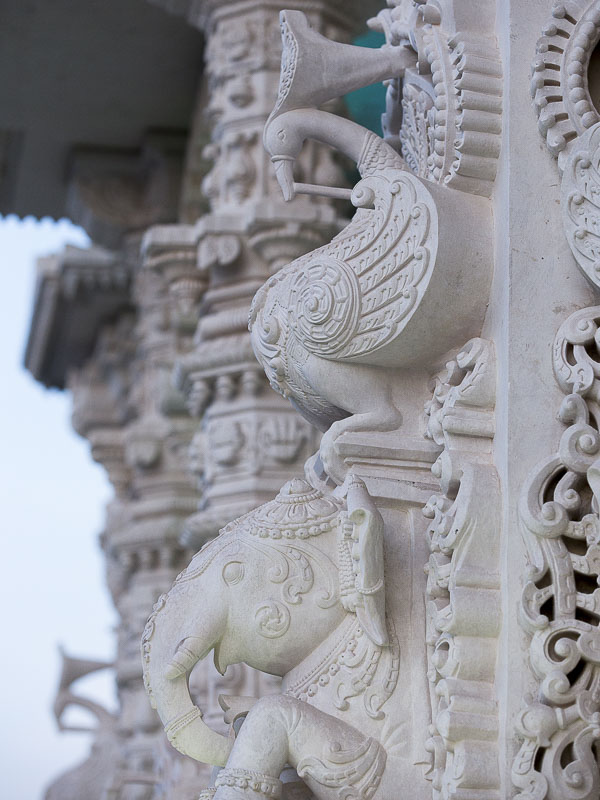
Mandir carving

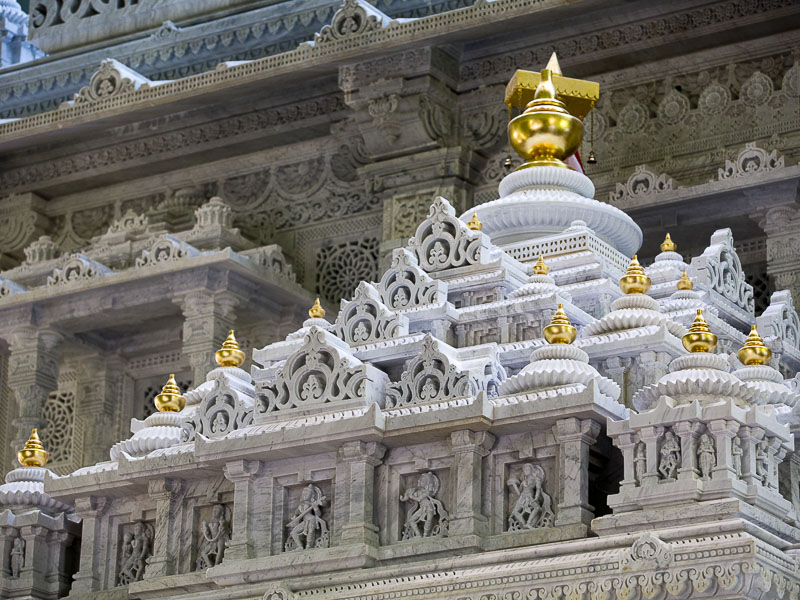
Mandir exterior

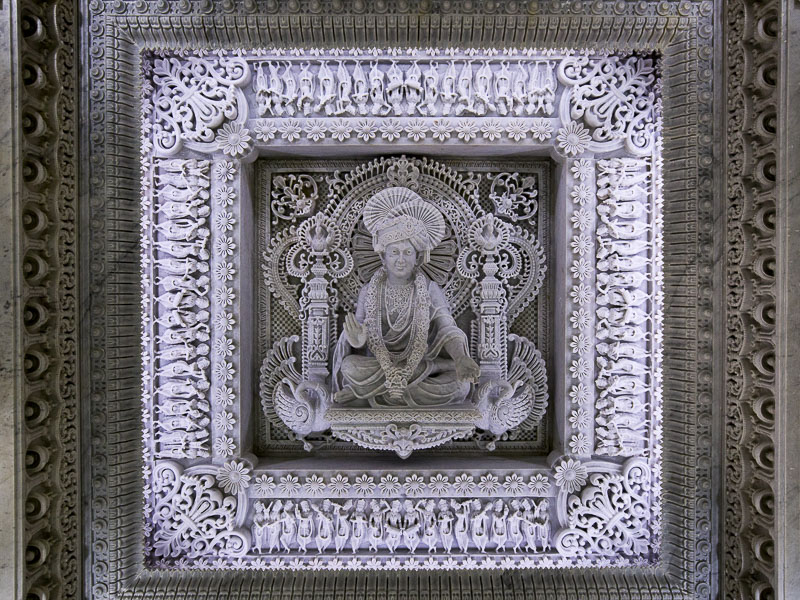
Mandir carving - Swaminarayan

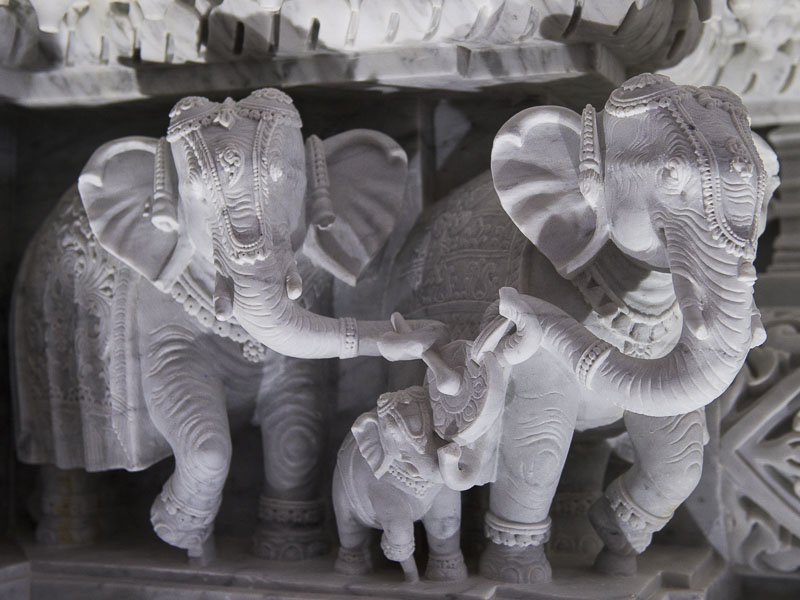
Mandir carving

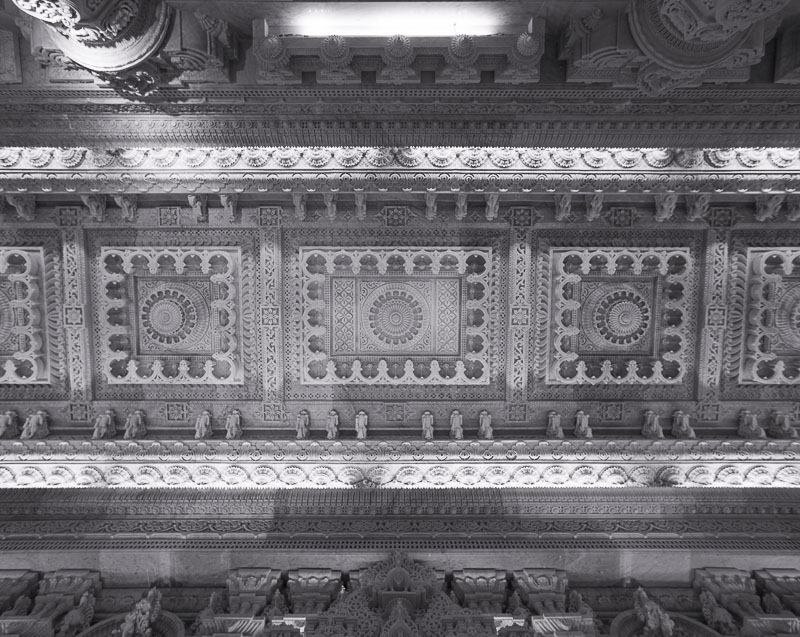
Mandir carving

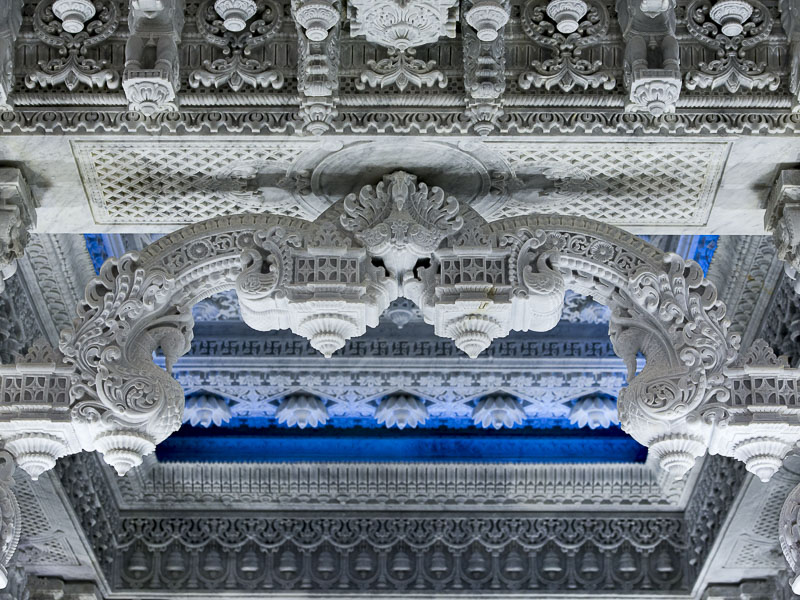
Mandir carving

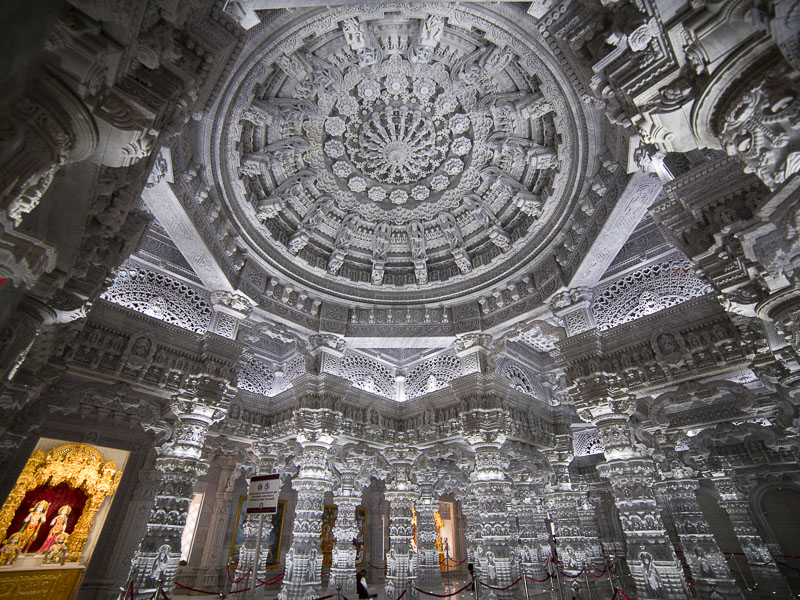
Mandir interior dome

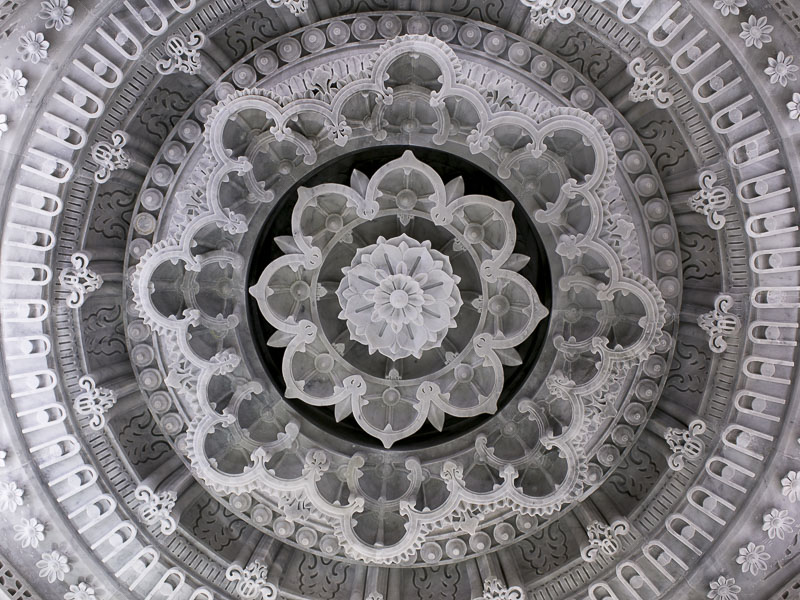
Mandir interior dome

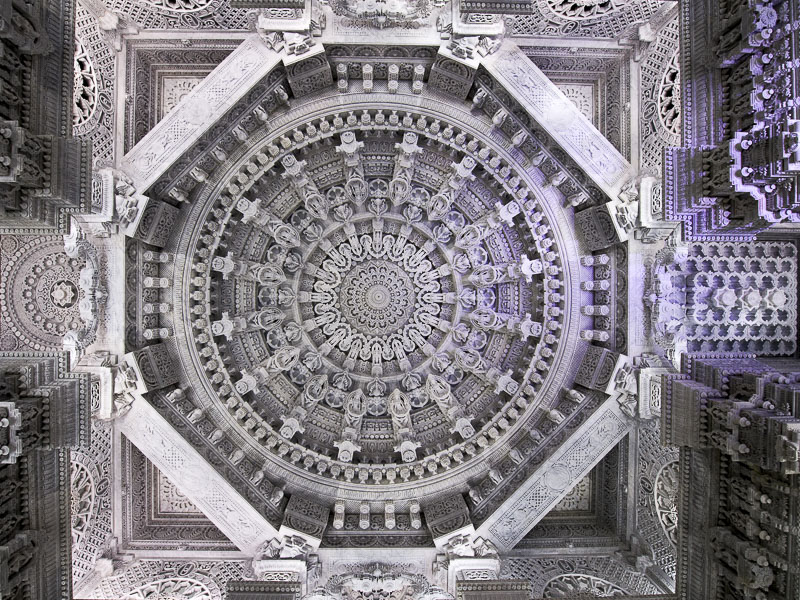
Mandir interior dome

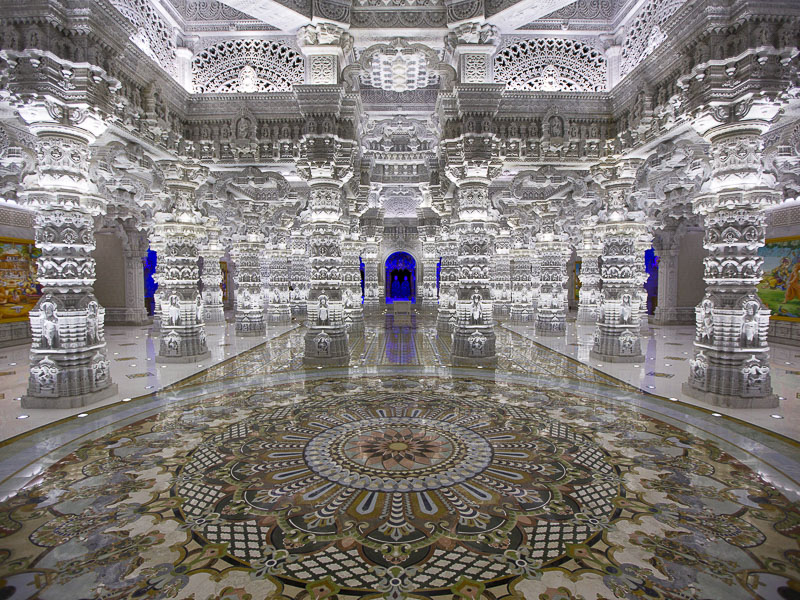
Mandir interior

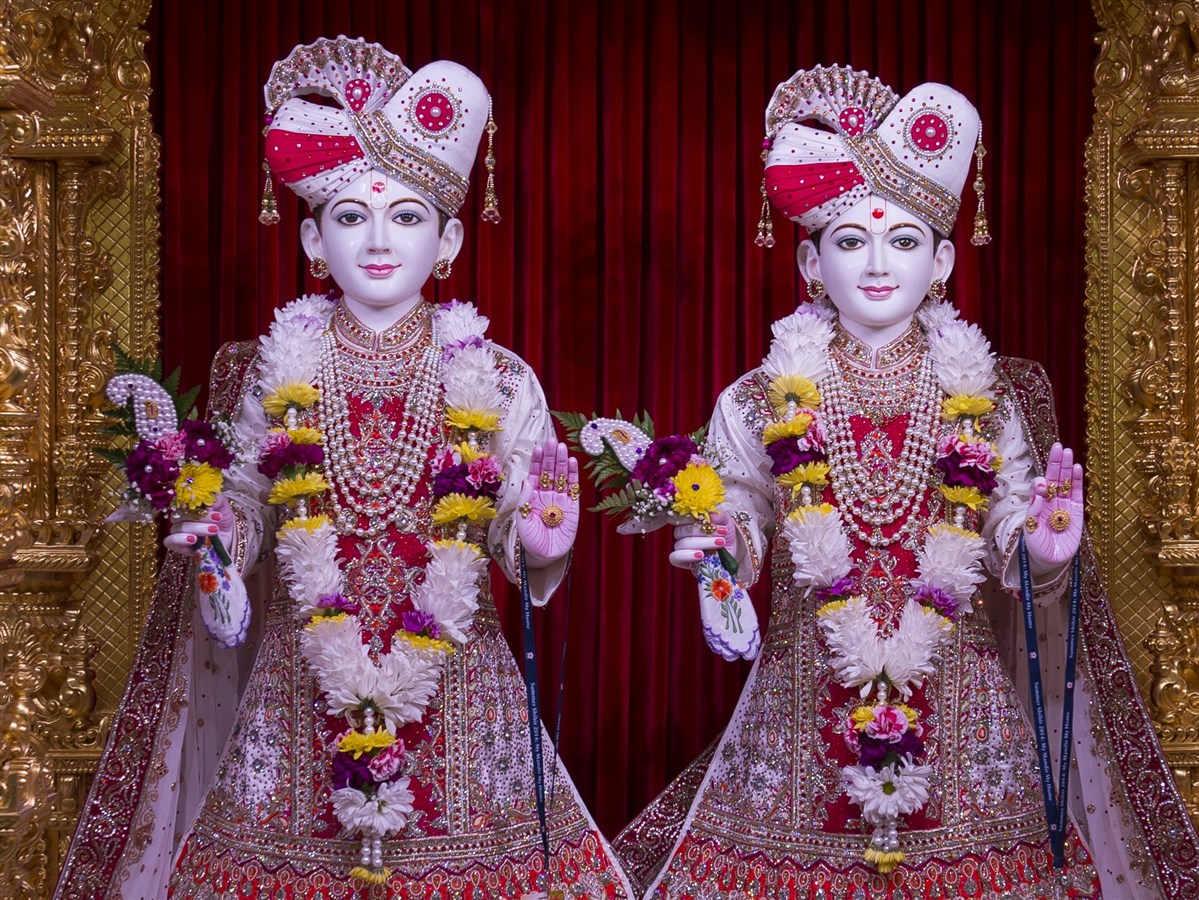
Bhagwan Swaminarayan and Gunatitanand Swami

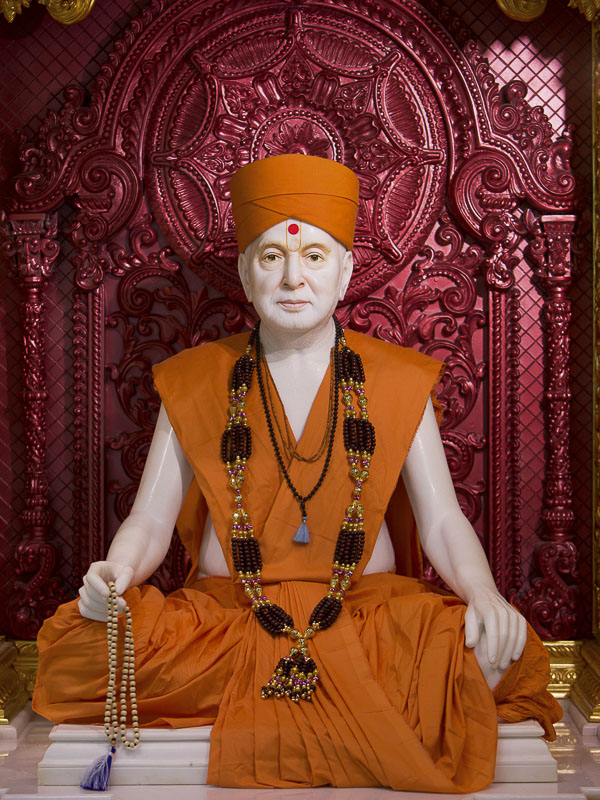
Pramukh Swami Maharaj
