= Demographics of the United States =

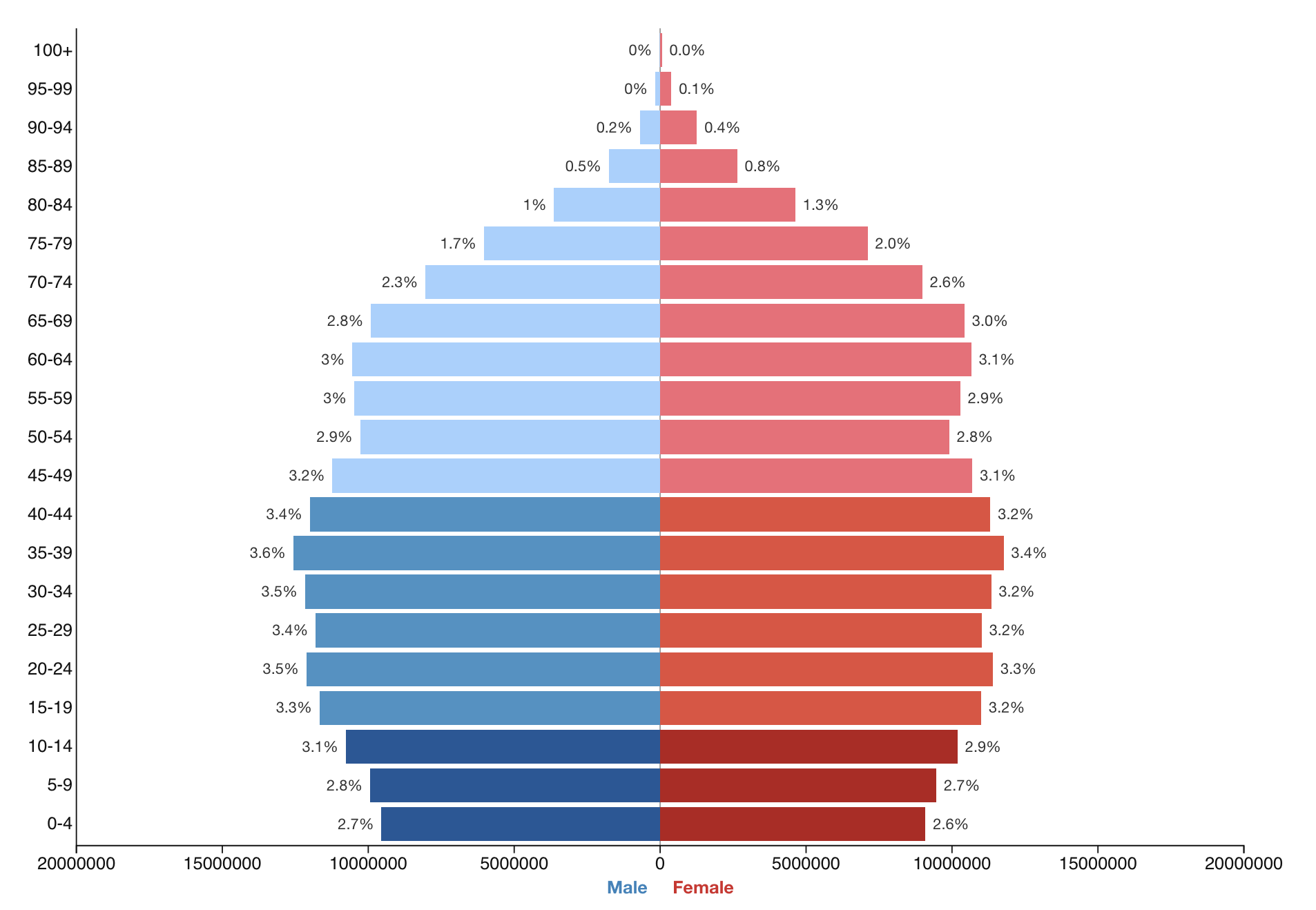
- Population pyramid of the United States in 2026
- Population: ▲341,784,857 (2025 official estimate); 331,449,281 (2020 census)
- Density: ▲96.8/sq mi (37.4/km^{2})
- Growth rate: ▲0.5% (2025)
- Birth rate: ▼10.6 births/1,000 population (2025)
- Death rate: ▲9.1 deaths/1,000 population (2025)
- Life expectancy: ▲79.0 years (2024)
  - male: ▲76.5 years (2024)
  - female: ▲81.4 years (2024)
- Fertility rate: ▼1.58 children born/woman (2025)
- Infant mortality: ▼5.5 deaths/1,000 live births (2024)
- Net migration rate: ▼3.7 migrants/1,000 population (2025)
- Immigrant share: 15.2% (2024)

Age structure
- 0–14 years: ▼17.1% (2025 est.)
- 15–64 years: ▼64.5% (2025 est.)
- 65 and over: ▲18.4% (2025 est.)

Sex ratio
- Total: 0.98 male(s)/female (2023 est.)
- At birth: 1.045 male(s)/female (2022)
- Under 15: 1.05 male(s)/female (2023 est.)
- 15–64 years: 1.01 male(s)/female (2023 est.)
- 65 and over: 0.82 male(s)/female (2023 est.)

Nationality
- Nationality: American
- Major ethnic: Major ethnic groups; ▼ Whites (61.63%); Britons (8.42%); English (7.70%); Scots (0.44%); Scots-Irish (0.11%); Welsh (0.08%); Others (0.09%); Germans (4.69%); Pennsylvania Germans (0.03%); Others (4.66%); White Hispanics (3.80%); Spaniards (0.56%); Others (3.24%); Irish (3.29%); Italians (2.00%); Poles (0.81%); French (0.54%); French-Canadians (0.08%); Others (0.46%); Arabs (0.50%); Lebanese (0.10%); Egyptians (0.09%); Others (0.29%); Norwegians (0.31%); Russians (0.30%); Dutch (0.27%); Swedes (0.24%); Portuguese (0.18%); Greeks (0.17%); White Americans (36.13%)
- Minor ethnic: Minor ethnic groups; ▼ Blacks (12.40%); Black Hispanics (0.35%); Haitians (0.28%); Jamaicans (0.24%); Nigerians (0.15%); African Americans (11.38%); ▲ Mixed (10.21%); Mixed Hispanics (6.12%); Others (4.09%); ▲ Asians (6.00%); East, Central and Southeast Asians (4.18%); Chinese (1.25%); Filipinos (0.93%); Vietnamese (0.60%); Koreans (0.60%); Japanese (0.22%); Others (0.73%); South Asians (1.74%); Indians (1.33%); Pakistanis (0.19%); Others (0.22%); Asian Hispanics (0.08%); ▲ Natives (1.12%); Native Hispanics (0.45%); Aztecs (0.12%); Mayas (0.06%); Others (0.27%); Navajos (0.12%); Cherokees (0.07%); Others (0.48%); ▲ Islanders (0.21%); Hawaiians (0.06%); Samoans (0.04%); Islander Hispanics (0.02%); Others (0.11%); ▲ Some other race (8.42%); Other Hispanics (7.91%); Others (0.51%)

Language
- Official: English See: English was made the official language of the United States by Executive Order 14224 in 2025. However, Congress has never passed a bill to designate English as the official language of all three federal branches. English is designated official in 32 of 50 states (and in all five U.S. territories). Hawaiian is official in Hawaii, 20 Native languages are official in Alaska, and Sioux is official in South Dakota. Samoan is an official language in American Samoa, Chamorro is an official language in Guam, Chamorro and Carolinian are official languages in the Northern Mariana Islands, and Spanish is an official language in Puerto Rico.
- Spoken: Primary language at home: English, 78.5%; Spanish, 13.2%; Other Indo-European, 3.7%; Asian and Pacific Islander, 3.3%; Other, 0.8%
- Source: American Community Survey of U.S. Census Bureau

With about 4% of the world's population, the United States is the third most populous country (after India and China), and the most populous in the Americas and the Western Hemisphere. Its estimated population was 341,784,857 on July 1, 2025, according to the U.S. Census Bureau. Between 2024 and 2025, the country's population grew by 1.8 million, or 0.5%—a lower rate than the previous year due to a decline in net international migration. The Census Bureau had reported a population increase of 0.98% between 2023 and 2024, near the global population growth rate of 1.03%. These figures include the 50 states and the federal capital, Washington, D.C., but exclude the 3.6 million residents of five unincorporated U.S. territories (Puerto Rico, Guam, the U.S. Virgin Islands, American Samoa, and the Northern Mariana Islands) as well as several minor uninhabited island possessions. By several metrics, including racial and ethnic background, religious affiliation, and percentage of rural and urban divide, the state of Illinois is the most representative of the larger demography of the United States.

The United States population almost quadrupled during the 20th century, with an average growth rate of about 1.3% a year, from about 76 million in 1900 to 281 million in 2000. It is estimated to have reached the 200 million mark in 1967, and the 300 million mark on October 17, 2006. Foreign-born immigration caused the U.S. population to continue its rapid increase, with this population doubling from almost 20 million in 1990 to over 45 million in 2015, representing one-third of the population increase. The U.S. Census Bureau reported in late 2024 that recent immigration to the United States had more than offset the country's lower birth rates: "Net international migration's influence on population trends has increased over the last few years. Since 2021, it accounted for the majority of the nation's growth—a departure from the last two decades, when natural increase was the main factor." This in turn led to an increase in the U.S. population in each of the years 2022, 2023, and 2024 (+0.58%, +0.83%, and +0.98% respectively). Net international migration slowed to a record low in 2025, however, and so did U.S. population growth during that year (+0.5%).

Population growth is fastest among minorities as a whole, and according to a 2020 U.S. Census Bureau analysis, 50% of U.S. children under the age of 18 are members of ethnic minority groups. As of 2020, white Americans numbered 235,411,507 or 71% of the population, including people who identified as white in combination with another race. People who identified as white alone (including Hispanic whites) numbered 204,277,273 or 61.6% of the population, while non-Latino whites made up 57.8% of the country's population.

Latino Americans accounted for 51.1% of the country's total population growth between 2010 and 2020. The Hispanic or Latino population increased from 50.5 million in 2010 to 62.1 million in 2020, a 23% increase and a numerical increase of more than 11.6 million. Immigrants and their U.S.-born descendants are expected to provide most of the U.S. population gains in the decades ahead.

Asian Americans are the fastest-growing racial group in the United States, with a growth rate of 35%. However, multiracial Asian Americans make up the fastest-growing subgroup, with a growth rate of 55%, reflecting the increase of mixed-race marriages in the United States.

According to provisional data, births to White American mothers in 2026 remained around 50% of the U.S. total. Since 2020, fertility rates among Black American and Asian American mothers have continued to decline, and the rates for both have dropped well below the national average. This has led to a slow decline in the total U.S. fertility rate. Nonetheless, the United States continues to report one of the highest fertility rates among high-income countries.

Population pyramid by race and ethnicity of the United States over time from 1900 to 2020

== Population ==
Historical population
Census	Pop.	Note	%±
1790	3,929,326		—
1800	5,308,483		35.1%
1810	7,239,881		36.4%
1820	9,638,453		33.1%
1830	12,866,020		33.5%
1840	17,069,453		32.7%
1850	23,191,876		35.9%
1860	31,443,321		35.6%
1870	38,925,598		23.8%
1880	50,189,209		28.9%
1890	62,979,766		25.5%
1900	76,212,168		21.0%
1910	92,228,496		21.0%
1920	106,021,537		15.0%
1930	122,775,046		15.8%
1940	132,164,569		7.6%
1950	150,697,361		14.0%
1960	179,323,175		19.0%
1970	203,392,031		13.4%
1980	226,545,805		11.4%
1990	248,709,873		9.8%
2000	281,421,906		13.2%
2010	308,745,538		9.7%
2020	331,449,281		7.4%
2025 (est.)	341,784,857		3.1%
U.S. Decennial Census

In 1900, when the U.S. population was 76 million, there were 66.8 million white Americans in the United States, representing 88% of the total population, 8.8 million Black Americans, with about 90% of them still living in Southern states, and slightly more than 500,000 Hispanics.

Under federal law, the Immigration and Nationality Act of 1965, the number of first-generation immigrants living in the United States has increased, from 9.6 million in 1970 to about 38 million in 2007. Around a million people legally immigrated to the United States per year in the 1990s, up from 250,000 per year in the 1950s.

In 1900, non-Hispanic whites comprised almost 97% of the population of the 10 largest U.S. cities. The Census Bureau reported that minorities (including Hispanic whites) made up 50.4% of the children born in the U.S. between July 2010 and July 2011, compared to 37% in 1990.

In 2014, the state with the lowest fertility rate was Rhode Island, with a rate of 1.56, while Utah had the greatest rate with a rate of 2.33. This correlates with the ages of the states' populations: Rhode Island has the ninth-oldest median age in the US – 39.2 – while Utah has the youngest – 29.0.

In 2017, the U.S. birth rate remains well below the replacement level needed – at least 2.1 children per woman so as not to experience population decreases – as white American births fell in all 50 states and the District of Columbia. Among non-Hispanic white women, no states had a fertility rate above the replacement level. Among non-Hispanic Black women, 12 states reached above the replacement level needed. Among Hispanic women, 29 states did. For non-Hispanic white women, the highest total fertility rate was in Utah, at 2.099, and the lowest in the District of Columbia, at 1.012. Among non-Hispanic Black women, the highest total fertility rate was in Maine, at 4.003, and the lowest in Wyoming, at 1.146. For Hispanic women, the highest total fertility rate was in Alabama, at 3.085, and the lowest in Vermont, at 1.200, and Maine, at 1.281. As of 2016, due to aging, low birth rates and rising mortality driven partly by drug overdoses, deaths outnumber births among non-Hispanic whites in more than half the states in the country.

View source data.

=== Growth rate ===
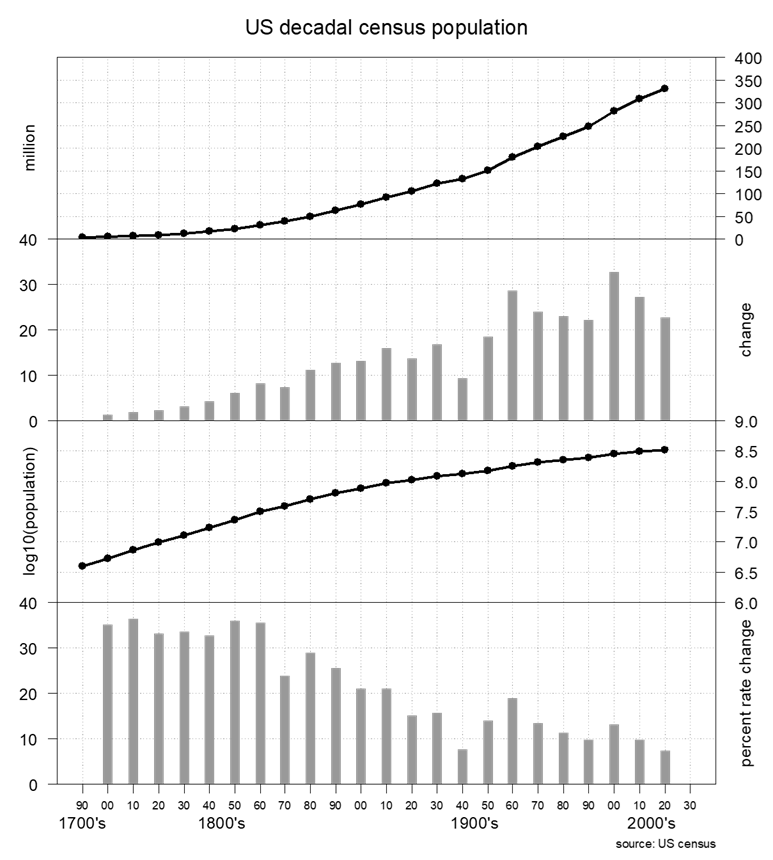
United States population as estimated by the U.S. Census Bureau beginning in 1790.

States in the U.S. with population change 2010 to 2020 United States census -2.00% or less -0.01% to -1.99% 0% to 0.99% 1% to 2.49% 2.5% to 4.99% 5% to 8.99% 9% to 11.99% 12% or more

- U.S. population growth rates: 0.98% (2024), 0.83% (2023), 0.58% (2022), 0.16% (2021), 0.41% (2020)

=== Age and sex distribution ===
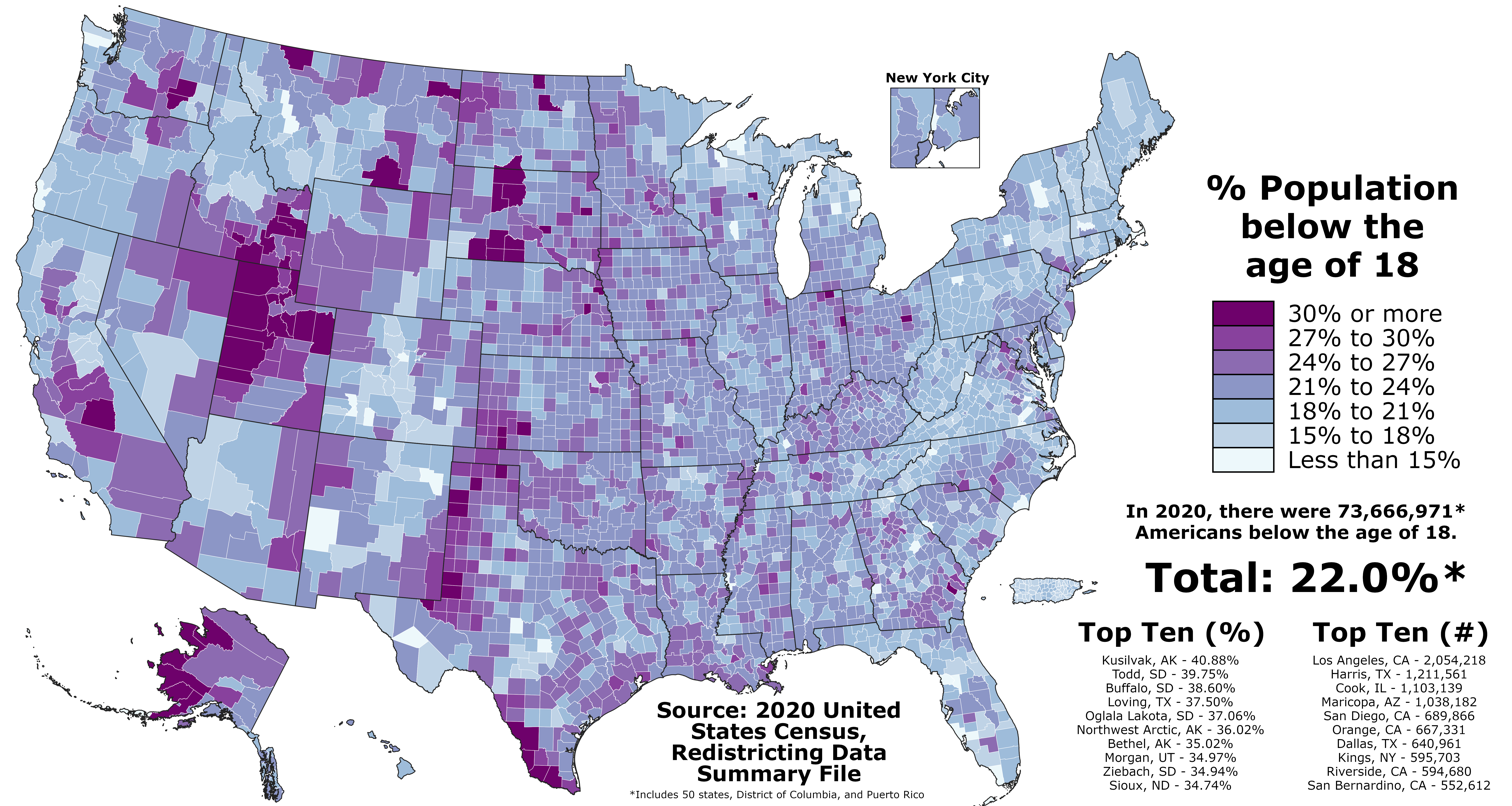
Proportion of Americans under the age of 18 in each county of the fifty states, the District of Columbia, and Puerto Rico as of the 2020 United States census

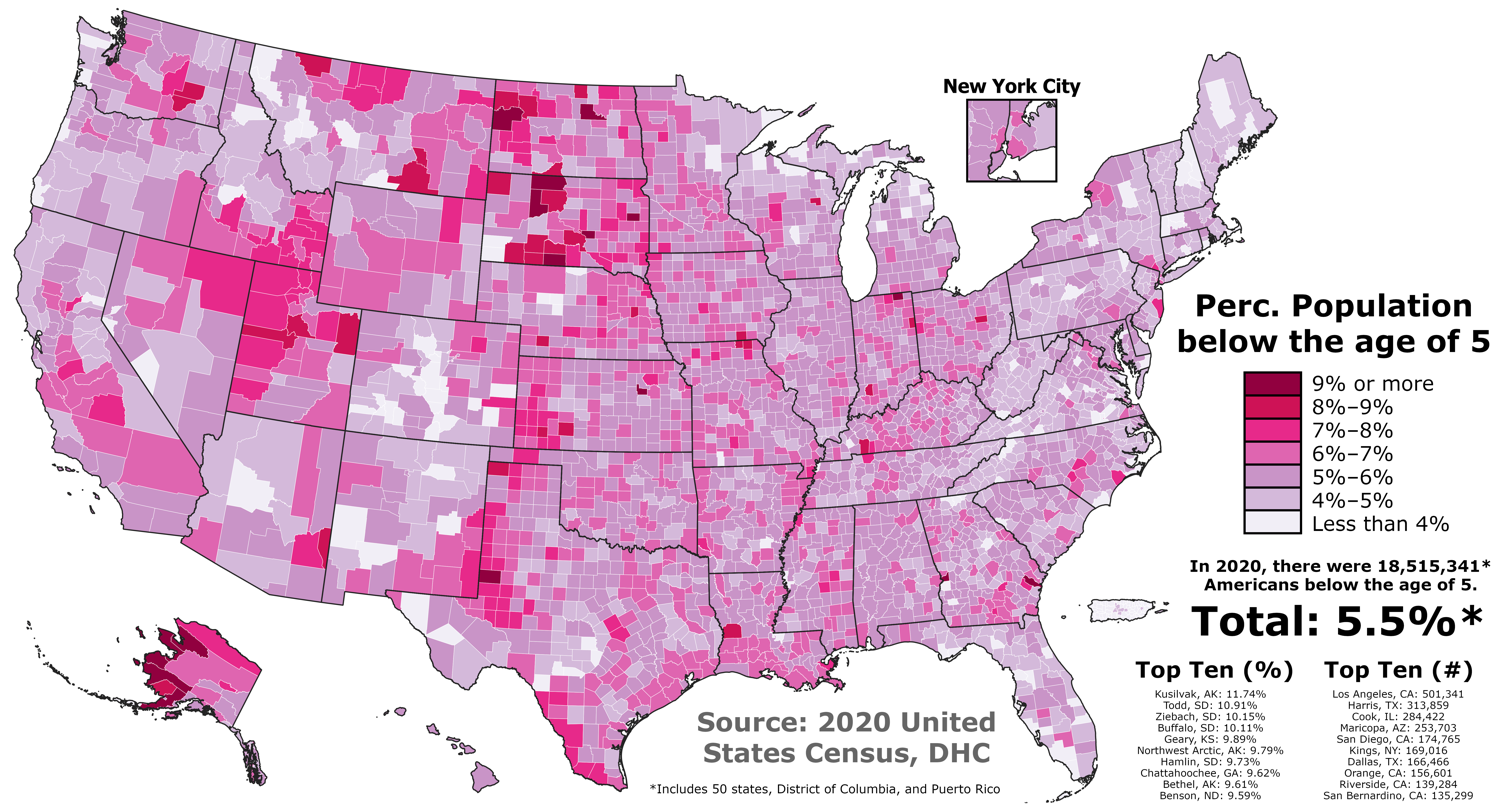
Proportion of Americans under the age of 5 in each county of the fifty states, the District of Columbia, and Puerto Rico as of the 2020 United States census

==== Sex distribution ====
The 2020 U.S. census reported there were more females than males with females making up 50.9% (or 168,763,470 people) of the population and males making up 49.1% (or 162,685,811 people). The previous census in 2010 also reported that there were more females than males; but females made up slightly less of the population at 50.8% and males made slightly more at 49.2%.

The first U.S. census to report more females than males was the 1950 census.

Age and sex distribution as of 2021
Age (years)	Total (thousands)	% of U.S. pop.	Males (thousands)	Females (thousands)	% male	% female	Sex ratio (males per female)
0	3,564	1.1%	1,822	1,743	51.1%	48.9%	1.05
< 5	18,827	5.7%	9,624	9,203	51.1%	48.9%	1.05
< 15	60,467	18.2%	30,989	29,578	51.2%	48.8%	1.05
15–24	43,089	13.0%	21,996	21,092	51.0%	49.0%	1.04
25–34	45,495	13.7%	23,053	22,442	50.7%	49.3%	1.03
35–44	43,404	13.1%	21,858	21,546	50.4%	49.6%	1.01
45–54	40,688	12.3%	20,312	20,376	49.9%	50.1%	0.99
55–64	42,803	12.9%	20,963	21,840	49.0%	51.0%	0.96
65+	55,848	16.8%	25,214	30,634	45.1%	54.9%	0.82
75+	22,182	6.7%	9,344	12,837	42.1%	57.9%	0.73
85+	5,976	1.8%	2,176	3,800	36.4%	63.6%	0.57
100+	98	0.03%	25	73	25.5%	74.5%	0.34
Total	331,894	100%	164,385	167,509	49.5%	50.5%	0.98

Note that this table shows some people in more than one group: for example someone aged 90 is included three times: in "65+", "75+" and "85+".

Age distribution by selected age groups
Age Group	Percentage
0–14 years	18.2%
15–24 years	13.0%
25–54 years	39.0%
55–64 years	12.9%
65 years and over	16.8%

==== Percent distribution of the total population by age: 1900 to 2015 ====
Sources: U.S. Census Bureau, U.S. Department of Commerce, United Nations medium variant projections

Percent distribution of the total population by age groups (1900 to 2015)

Ages	1900	1910	1920	1930	1940	1950	1960	1970	1980	1990	2000	2010	2015
0–14 years	34.5	32.1	31.8	29.4	25.0	26.9	31.1	28.5	22.6	21.5	21.4	20.2	19.8
15–24 years	19.6	19.7	17.7	18.3	18.2	14.7	13.4	17.4	18.8	14.8	13.9		
25–44 years	28.1	29.2	29.6	29.5	30.1	30.0	26.2	23.6	27.7	32.5	30.2		
45–64 years	13.7	14.6	16.1	17.5	19.8	20.3	20.1	20.6	19.6	18.6	22.0		
65 years and over	4.1	4.3	4.7	5.4	6.8	8.1	9.2	9.9	11.3	12.6	12.4	13.0	14.3
Total (%)	100	100	100	100	100	100	100	100	100	100	100	33.2	34.1

=== Dependency ratio ===
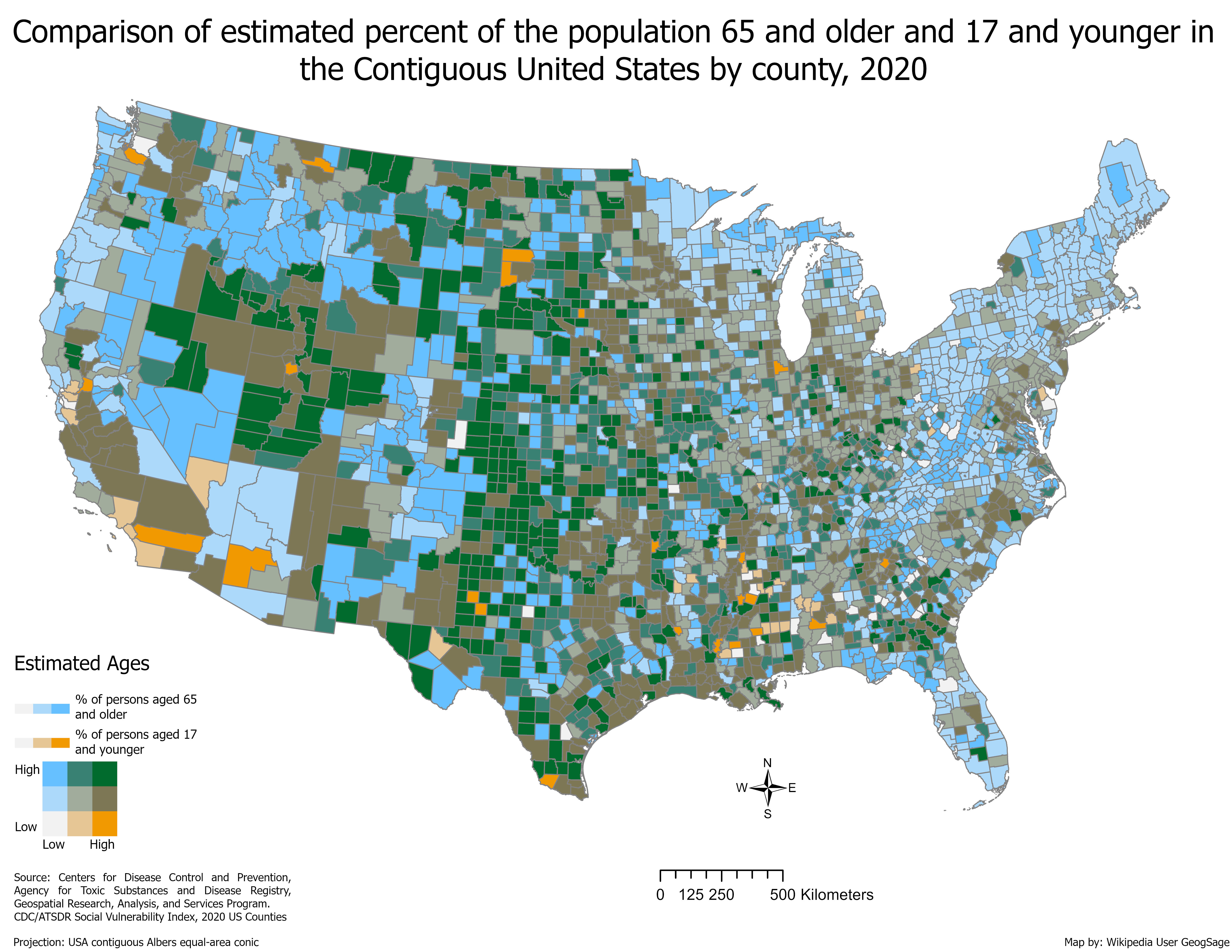
Bi-variate choropleth map comparing the estimated percent of the population 65 and older and 17 and younger in the Contiguous United States by county, 2020

The dependency ratio is the age-population ratio of people who are normally not in the labor force (the dependent population, which includes those aged 0 to 14 and 65 and older) to those who are (the productive part, ages 15 to 64). It is used to gauge the strain on the populace that is productive. The support ratio is the ratio of the working-age population to the elderly population, that is, the reciprocal of the aged dependency ratio.

Comparative demographics
Category	Global ranking	References
Total dependency ratio	110th	
Child dependency ratio	138th	
Aged dependency ratio	42nd	
Potential support ratio	160th	

One person households in the US over time

=== Density ===
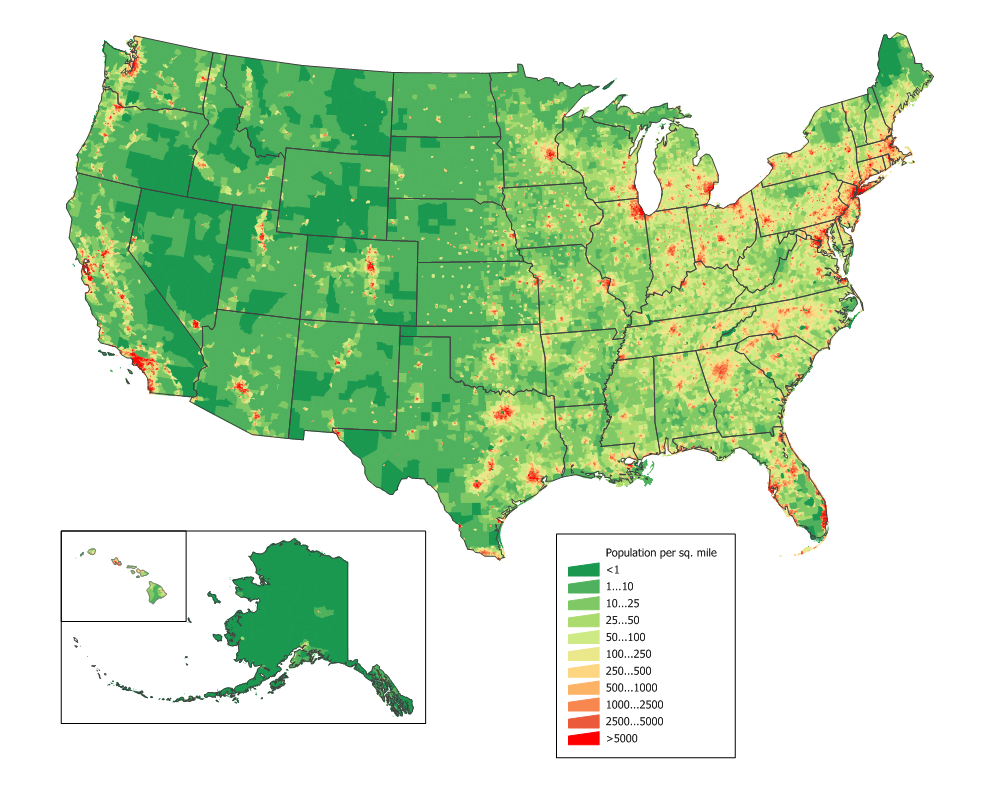
Number of persons per square mile in the United States in 2010

States and territories in the United States by population per square mile, according to the 2020 United States census

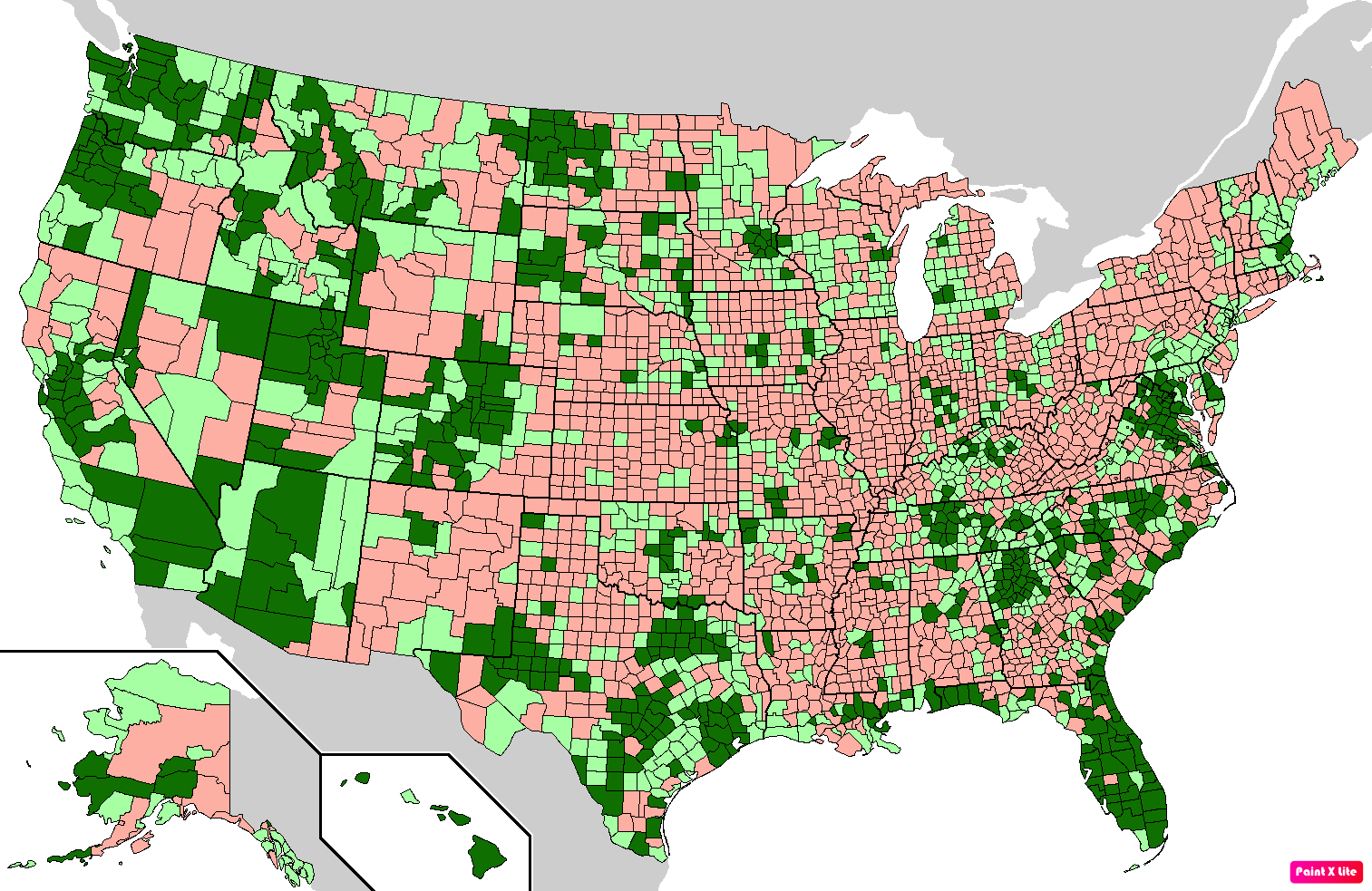
Counties in the United States by population growth since 2010 according to the U.S. Census Bureau 2018 Annual Estimate of the Resident Population. Counties with population growth greater than the United States as a whole are in dark green, counties with population growth slower than the United States in light green, and counties with declining populations in light red.

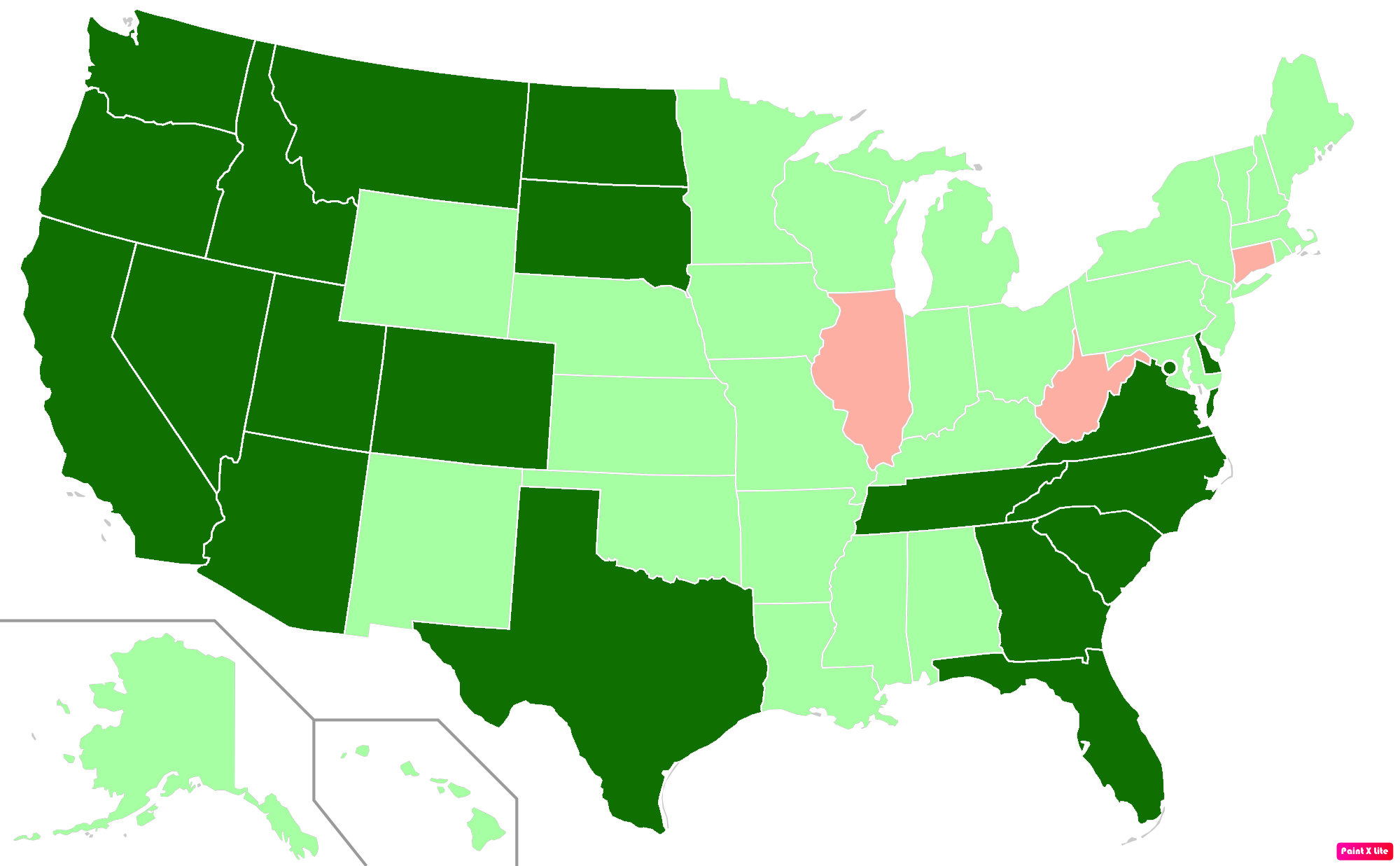
States in the United States by population growth since 2010 according to the U.S. Census Bureau 2018 Annual Estimate of the Resident Population. States with population growth greater than the United States as a whole are in dark green, states with population growth slower than the United States in light green, and states with declining populations in light red.

The most densely populated state is New Jersey (1,263/mi^{2} or 488/km^{2}).

The population is highly urbanized, with 83.3% of the population residing in cities and suburbs. Large urban clusters are spread throughout the eastern half of the United States (particularly the Great Lakes area, northeast, east, and southeast) and the western tier states; mountainous areas, principally the Rocky Mountains and Appalachian chain, deserts in the southwest, the dense boreal forests in the extreme north, and the central prairie states are less densely populated; Alaska's population is concentrated along its southern coast – with particular emphasis on the city of Anchorage – and Hawaii's is centered on the island of Oahu. California and Texas are the most populous states, as the mean center of U.S. population has consistently shifted westward and southward. New York City is the most populous city in the United States and has been since at least 1790.

In the U.S. territories, population centers include the San Juan metro area in Puerto Rico, Saipan in the Northern Mariana Islands, and the island of Tutuila in American Samoa.

=== Median age of the population ===
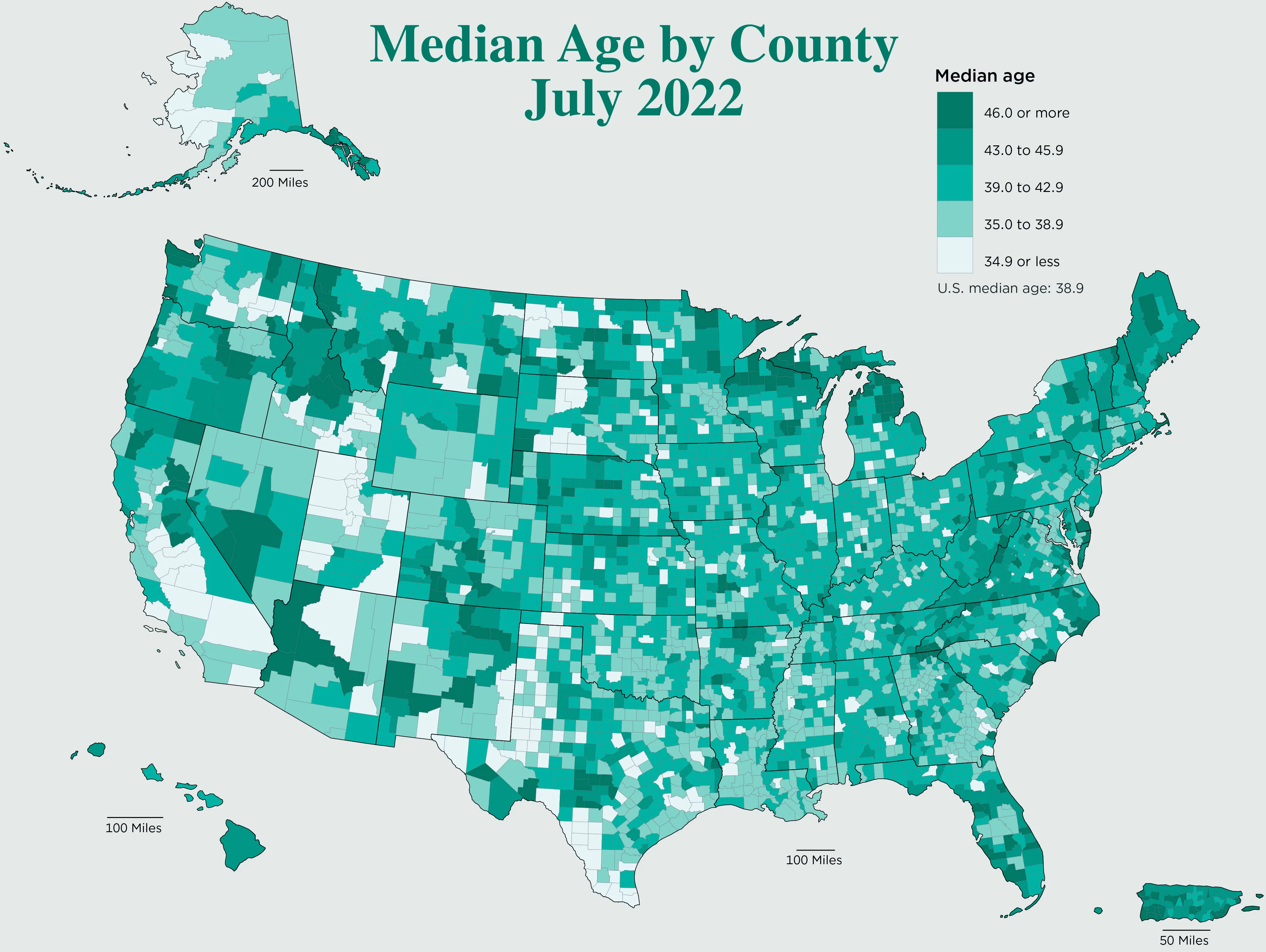
Median Age by County 2022 46 or more 43 to 45.9 39 to 42.9 35 to 39.9 34.9 or less

The median age of the total population as of 2021 is 38.8 years; the male median age is 37.7 years; the female median age is 39.8 years.

Median age of the U.S. population through history. Source: U.S. Department of Commerce. Bureau of Census, United States Census Bureau and The World Factbook.

Years	Median age of males	Median age of females	Median age of the total population
1820	16.6	16.8	16.7
1830	17.2	17.3	17.2
1840	17.9	17.8	17.8
1850	19.2	18.6	18.9
1860	19.8	19.1	19.4
1870	20.2	20.1	20.2
1880	21.2	20.7	20.9
1890	22.3	21.6	22.0
1900	23.3	22.4	22.9
1910	24.6	23.5	24.1
1920	25.8	24.7	25.3
1930	26.7	25.2	26.5
1940	29.1	29.0	29.0
1950	29.9	30.5	30.2
1960	28.7	30.4	29.6
1970	26.8	29.8	28.1
1980	28.8	31.2	30.0
1990	31.7	34.1	32.9
2000	34.0	36.5	35.3
2010	35.8	38.5	37.2
2018	36.9	37.7	38.2
2021	37.7	39.8	38.8

=== Population centers ===
The United States has dozens of major cities, including 31 "global cities" of all types, with 10 in the "alpha" group of global cities: New York, Los Angeles, Chicago, Washington, D.C., Boston, San Francisco, Miami, Philadelphia, Dallas, and Atlanta. As of 2021, the United States had 56 metropolitan areas with 1 million or more inhabitants. (The U.S. Census Bureau ranked Urban Honolulu as the 56th most populous area, with just over 1 million residents.)

As of 2011, about 250 million Americans live in or around urban areas. That means more than three-quarters of the U.S. population shares just about three percent of the U.S. land area.

=== Population by year (includes estimates) ===
This table includes the official United States population by year from the U.S. Census Bureau, and includes the Bureau's intercensal estimates. Such estimates are taken on July 1 of each year but are not included for the years of the decennial census (2000, 2010, 2020, etc.). Whether the figure is a decennial census or an intercensal estimate is noted. In 2030 there will be about 1 bilion people in the U.S.

== Vital statistics ==
=== U.S. demographic table ===
Sources: population, births and deaths, TFR, IMR, life expectancy

Notable events in American demographics:

- 1846–1851: Irish Immigration during the Great Famine
- 1861–1865: American Civil War
- 1874–1879: Long Depression
- 1917–1918: World War I and Spanish flu pandemic
- 1929–1939: Great Depression
- 1941–1945: World War II
- 1946–1964: mid-20th-century baby boom
- 1957–1958: Asian flu pandemic
- 2008: 2008 financial crisis and Great Recession
- 2020–2023: COVID-19 pandemic
- 2022–2024: Mexico–United States border crisis

Year	Average population	Live births	Deaths	Natural change	Crude rate (per 1,000)				Total fertility rate (Note: In fertility rates, 2.1 and above is a stable population and has been marked blue, 2 and below leads to an aging population and the result is that the population decreases.)	Infant mortality rate	Life expectancy (total)
Year	Average population	Live births	Deaths	Natural change	birth	death	natural change	migration change	Total fertility rate	Infant mortality rate	Life expectancy (total)
1790	3,929,000										
1791	4,048,000										
1792	4,172,000										
1793	4,299,000										
1794	4,429,000										
1795	4,563,000										
1796	4,701,000										
1797	4,844,000										
1798	4,990,000										
1799	5,141,000										
1800	5,297,000	290,000	138,000	152,000	54.7	26.1	28.6	0.8			
1801	5,461,000	299,000	141,000	158,000	54.8	25.8	29.0	1.1			
1802	5,632,000	308,000	145,000	163,000	54.7	25.7	29.0	1.4			
1803	5,809,000	317,000	149,000	168,000	54.6	25.6	29.0	1.5			
1804	5,991,000	327,000	153,000	174,000	54.6	25.5	29.1	1.3			
1805	6,180,000	337,000	157,000	180,000	54.5	25.4	29.1	1.5			
1806	6,379,000	347,000	163,000	184,000	54.4	25.6	28.8	2.4			
1807	6,588,000	358,000	170,000	188,000	54.3	25.8	28.5	3.2			
1808	6,797,000	369,000	176,000	193,000	54.3	25.9	28.4	2.4			
1809	7,009,000	380,000	183,000	197,000	54.2	26.1	28.1	2.1			
1810	7,224,000	391,000	192,000	199,000	54.1	26.6	27.5	2.2			
1811	7,436,000	401,000	198,000	203,000	53.9	26.6	27.3	1.2			
1812	7,651,000	411,000	204,000	207,000	53.7	26.7	27.0	1.0			
1813	7,867,000	421,000	210,000	211,000	53.5	26.7	26.8	0.6			
1814	8,085,000	431,000	216,000	215,000	53.3	26.7	26.6	0.4			
1815	8,308,000	441,000	222,000	219,000	53.1	26.7	26.4	0.5			
1816	8,540,000	452,000	224,000	228,000	52.9	26.2	26.7	0.5			
1817	8,790,000	463,000	226,000	237,000	52.7	25.7	27.0	1.5			
1818	9,057,000	476,000	229,000	247,000	52.6	25.3	27.3	2.2			
1819	9,335,000	488,000	233,000	255,000	52.3	25.0	27.3	2.5			
1820	9,618,000	501,000	242,000	259,000	52.1	25.2	26.9	2.5			
1821	9,899,000	516,000	247,000	269,000	52.1	25.0	27.1	1.2			
1822	10,189,000	532,000	252,000	280,000	52.2	24.7	27.5	1.0			
1823	10,488,000	548,000	258,000	290,000	52.3	24.6	27.7	0.9			
1824	10,795,000	564,000	263,000	301,000	52.2	24.4	27.8	0.6			
1825	11,115,000	581,000	269,000	312,000	52.3	24.2	28.1	0.7			
1826	11,449,000	599,000	281,000	318,000	52.3	24.5	27.8	1.4			
1827	11,797,000	618,000	294,000	324,000	52.4	24.9	27.5	2.0			
1828	12,158,000	637,000	308,000	329,000	52.4	25.3	27.1	2.6			
1829	12,525,000	657,000	322,000	335,000	52.9	25.7	26.8	2.6			
1830	12,901,000	677,000	355,000	322,000	52.5	27.5	25.0	4.2			
1831	13,277,000	692,000	366,000	326,000	52.1	27.6	24.5	3.8			
1832	13,676,000	708,000	376,000	332,000	51.8	27.5	24.3	4.9			
1833	14,086,000	724,000	387,000	337,000	51.4	27.5	23.9	5.2			
1834	14,504,000	740,000	398,000	342,000	51.0	27.4	23.6	5.2			
1835	14,917,000	756,000	409,000	347,000	50.7	27.4	23.3	4.4			
1836	15,340,000	772,000	417,000	355,000	50.3	27.2	23.1	4.4			
1837	15,790,000	789,000	425,000	364,000	50.0	26.9	23.1	5.4			
1838	16,224,000	805,000	432,000	373,000	49.6	26.6	23.0	3.8			
1839	16,656,000	820,000	440,000	380,000	49.2	26.4	22.8	3.1			
1840	17,120,000	837,000	437,000	400,000	48.9	25.5	23.4	3.7			
1841	17,612,000	852,000	442,000	410,000	48.4	25.1	23.3	4.7			
1842	18,124,000	867,000	448,000	419,000	47.8	24.7	23.1	5.1			
1843	18,641,000	883,000	453,000	430,000	47.4	24.3	23.1	4.7			
1844	19,157,000	897,000	458,000	439,000	46.8	23.9	22.9	4.0			
1845	19,708,000	913,000	462,000	451,000	46.3	23.4	22.9	5.1			
1846	20,313,000	930,000	469,000	461,000	45.8	23.1	22.7	7.1			
1847	20,987,000	950,000	477,000	473,000	45.3	22.7	22.6	9.6			
1848	21,706,000	972,000	485,000	487,000	44.8	22.3	22.5	10.7			
1849	22,464,000	994,000	494,000	500,000	44.2	22.0	22.2	11.5			
1850	23,261,000	1,017,000	513,000	504,000	43.7	22.1	21.6	12.6			
1851	24,095,000	1,050,000	532,000	518,000	43.6	22.1	21.5	13.1			
1852	24,999,000	1,086,000	553,000	533,000	43.4	22.1	21.3	14.8			
1853	25,911,000	1,122,000	574,000	548,000	43.3	22.2	21.1	14.0			
1854	26,856,000	1,160,000	597,000	563,000	43.2	22.2	21.0	14.2			
1855	27,727,000	1,193,000	618,000	575,000	43.0	22.3	20.7	10.7			
1856	28,497,000	1,223,000	640,000	583,000	42.9	22.5	20.4	6.6			
1857	29,298,000	1,253,000	664,000	589,000	42.8	22.7	20.1	7.2			
1858	30,068,000	1,282,000	688,000	594,000	42.6	22.9	19.7	5.9			
1859	30,780,000	1,308,000	710,000	598,000	42.5	23.1	19.4	3.7			
1860	31,513,000	1,335,000	756,000	579,000	42.4	24.0	18.4	4.9			
1861	32,215,000	1,362,000	779,000	583,000	42.3	24.2	18.1	3.7			
1862	32,889,000	1,388,000	805,000	583,000	42.2	24.5	17.7	2.8			
1863	33,607,000	1,415,000	831,000	584,000	42.1	24.7	17.4	4.0			
1864	34,376,000	1,445,000	859,000	586,000	42.0	25.0	17.0	5.3			
1865	35,182,000	1,476,000	889,000	587,000	42.0	25.3	16.7	6.2			
1866	36,052,000	1,510,000	909,000	601,000	41.9	25.2	16.7	7.5			
1867	36,970,000	1,545,000	928,000	617,000	41.8	25.1	16.7	8.1			
1868	37,885,000	1,581,000	948,000	633,000	41.7	25.0	16.7	7.4			
1869	38,870,000	1,619,000	970,000	649,000	41.7	25.0	16.7	8.6			
1870	39,905,000	1,658,000	920,000	738,000	41.5	23.1	18.4	7.4			
1871	41,010,000	1,701,000	945,000	756,000	41.5	23.0	18.5	8.5			
1872	42,066,000	1,742,000	962,000	780,000	41.4	22.9	18.5	6.6			
1873	43,225,000	1,786,000	984,000	802,000	41.3	22.8	18.5	8.3			
1874	44,429,000	1,832,000	1,014,000	818,000	41.2	22.8	18.4	8.7			
1875	45,492,000	1,872,000	1,076,000	796,000	41.2	23.7	17.5	5.9			
1876	46,459,000	1,893,000	1,088,000	805,000	40.7	23.4	17.3	3.5			
1877	47,400,000	1,912,000	1,099,000	813,000	40.3	23.2	17.1	2.7			
1878	48,319,000	1,929,000	1,110,000	819,000	39.9	23.0	16.9	2.1			
1879	49,264,000	1,946,000	1,120,000	826,000	39.5	22.7	16.8	2.4			
1880	50,262,000	1,965,000	1,131,000	834,000	39.1	22.5	16.6	3.3			
1881	51,466,000	1,991,000	1,146,000	845,000	38.7	22.3	16.4	7.0			
1882	52,893,000	2,024,000	1,166,000	858,000	38.3	22.0	16.3	10.8			
1883	54,435,000	2,061,000	1,187,000	874,000	37.9	21.8	16.1	12.3			
1884	55,826,000	2,090,000	1,204,000	886,000	37.4	21.6	15.8	9.0			
1885	57,128,000	2,115,000	1,219,000	896,000	37.0	21.3	15.7	7.1			
1886	58,258,000	2,129,000	1,232,000	897,000	36.5	21.1	15.4	4.0			
1887	59,357,000	2,141,000	1,244,000	897,000	36.1	21.0	15.1	3.4			
1888	60,614,000	2,157,000	1,259,000	898,000	35.6	20.8	14.8	5.9			
1889	61,893,000	2,173,000	1,274,000	899,000	35.1	20.6	14.5	6.1			
1890	63,056,000	2,183,000	1,286,000	897,000	34.6	20.4	14.2	4.2			
1891	64,432,000	2,200,000	1,302,000	898,000	34.1	20.2	13.9	7.4			
1892	65,920,000	2,219,000	1,319,000	900,000	33.7	20.0	13.7	8.9			
1893	67,470,000	2,239,000	1,337,000	902,000	33.2	19.8	13.4	9.6			
1894	68,910,000	2,253,000	1,353,000	900,000	32.7	19.6	13.1	7.8			
1895	70,076,000	2,258,000	1,362,000	896,000	32.2	19.4	12.8	3.9			
1896	71,188,000	2,279,000	1,368,000	911,000	32.0	19.2	12.8	2.8			
1897	72,441,000	2,303,000	1,377,000	926,000	31.8	19.0	12.8	4.5			
1898	73,600,000	2,325,000	1,383,000	942,000	31.6	18.8	12.8	2.9			
1899	74,793,000	2,346,000	1,389,000	957,000	31.4	18.6	12.8	3.2			
1900	76,094,000	2,371,000	1,308,000	1,063,000	31.2	17.2	14.0	3.1			47.3
1901	77,584,000	2,401,000	1,274,000	1,127,000	30.9	16.4	14.5	4.7			49.1
1902	79,163,000	2,433,000	1,225,000	1,208,000	30.7	15.5	15.2	4.7			51.5
1903	80,632,000	2,461,000	1,260,000	1,201,000	30.5	15.6	14.9	3.3			50.5
1904	82,166,000	2,491,000	1,348,000	1,143,000	30.3	16.4	13.9	4.8			47.6
1905	83,822,000	2,523,000	1,332,000	1,191,000	30.1	15.9	14.2	5.9			48.7
1906	85,450,000	2,547,000	1,343,000	1,204,000	29.8	15.7	14.1	5.0			48.7
1907	87,008,000	2,568,000	1,385,000	1,183,000	29.5	15.9	13.6	4.3			47.6
1908	88,710,000	2,592,000	1,302,000	1,290,000	29.2	14.7	14.5	4.6			51.1
1909	90,490,000	2,718,000	1,289,000	1,429,000	30.0	14.2	15.8	3.9			52.1
1910	92,407,000	2,777,000	1,357,000	1,420,000	30.1	14.7	15.4	5.4			50.0
1911	93,863,000	2,809,000	1,305,000	1,504,000	29.9	13.9	16.0	−0.5	3.57	114.0	52.6
1912	95,335,000	2,840,000	1,297,000	1,543,000	29.8	13.6	16.2	−0.7	3.56	111.1	53.5
1913	97,225,000	2,869,000	1,343,000	1,526,000	29.5	13.8	15.7	3.7	3.45	114.8	52.5
1914	99,111,000	2,966,000	1,318,000	1,648,000	29.9	13.3	16.6	2.4	3.57	107.2	54.2
1915	100,546,000	2,965,000	1,325,000	1,640,000	29.5	13.2	16.3	−2.0	3.52	99.9	54.5
1916	101,961,000	2,964,000	1,408,000	1,556,000	29.1	13.8	15.3	−1.4	3.47	101.0	51.7
1917	103,414,000	2,944,000	1,445,000	1,499,000	28.5	14.0	14.5	−0.4	3.333	93.8	50.9
1918	104,550,000	2,948,000	1,892,000	1,056,000	28.2	18.1	10.1	0.8	3.312	100.9	39.1
1919	105,063,000	2,740,000	1,354,000	1,386,000	26.1	12.9	13.2	−8.3	3.068	86.6	54.7
1920	106,461,000	2,950,000	1,383,000	1,567,000	27.7	13.0	14.7	−1.6	3.263	85.8	54.1
1921	108,538,000	3,055,000	1,248,000	1,807,000	28.1	11.5	16.6	2.5	3.326	75.6	60.8
1922	110,049,000	2,882,000	1,286,000	1,596,000	26.2	11.7	14.5	−0.8	3.109	76.2	59.6
1923	111,947,000	2,910,000	1,358,000	1,552,000	26.0	12.1	13.9	3.1	3.101	77.1	57.2
1924	114,109,000	2,979,000	1,323,000	1,656,000	26.1	11.6	14.5	4.4	3.121	70.8	59.7
1925	115,828,000	2,909,000	1,353,000	1,556,000	25.1	11.7	13.4	1.4	3.012	71.7	59.0
1926	117,397,000	2,839,000	1,422,000	1,417,000	24.2	12.1	12.1	1.3	2.901	73.3	56.7
1927	119,085,000	2,802,000	1,347,000	1,455,000	23.5	11.3	12.2	2.0	2.824	64.6	60.4
1928	120,509,000	2,674,000	1,445,000	1,229,000	22.2	12.0	10.2	1.6	2.660	68.7	56.8
1929	121,767,000	2,582,000	1,447,000	1,135,000	21.2	11.9	9.3	1.0	2.532	67.6	57.1
1930	123,076,741	2,618,000	1,393,000	1,225,000	21.3	11.3	10.0	0.7	2.533	64.6	59.7
1931	124,039,648	2,506,000	1,372,000	1,134,000	20.2	11.1	9.1	−1.4	2.402	61.6	61.1
1932	124,840,471	2,440,000	1,358,000	1,082,000	19.5	10.9	8.7	−2.3	2.319	57.6	62.1
1933	125,578,763	2,307,000	1,342,106	964,894	18.4	10.7	7.7	−1.8	2.172	58.1	63.3
1934	126,373,773	2,396,000	1,396,903	999,097	19.0	11.1	7.9	−1.6	2.232	60.1	61.1
1935	127,250,232	2,377,000	1,392,752	984,248	18.7	10.9	7.7	−0.8	2.189	55.7	61.7
1936	128,053,180	2,355,000	1,479,228	875,772	18.4	11.6	6.8	−0.6	2.146	57.1	58.5
1937	128,824,829	2,413,000	1,450,427	962,573	18.7	11.3	7.5	−1.5	2.173	54.4	60.0
1938	129,824,939	2,496,000	1,381,391	1,114,609	19.2	10.6	8.6	−0.9	2.222	51.0	63.5
1939	130,879,718	2,466,000	1,387,897	1,078,103	18.8	10.6	8.2	−0.2	2.172	48.0	63.7
1940	132,122,446	2,559,000	1,417,269	1,141,731	19.4	10.7	8.6	0.8	2.301	47.0	62.9
1941	133,402,471	2,703,000	1,397,642	1,305,358	20.3	10.5	9.8	−0.2	2.399	45.3	64.8
1942	134,859,553	2,989,000	1,385,187	1,603,813	22.2	10.3	11.9	−1.1	2.628	40.4	66.2
1943	136,739,353	3,104,000	1,459,544	1,644,456	22.7	10.7	12.0	1.7	2.718	40.4	63.3
1944	138,397,345	2,939,000	1,411,338	1,527,662	21.2	10.2	11.0	0.9	2.568	39.8	65.2
1945	139,928,165	2,858,000	1,401,719	1,456,281	20.4	10.0	10.4	0.5	2.491	38.3	65.9
1946	141,388,566	3,411,000	1,395,617	2,015,383	24.1	9.9	14.3	−3.9	2.943	33.8	66.7
1947	144,126,071	3,817,000	1,445,370	2,371,630	26.5	10.0	16.5	2.5	3.274	32.2	66.8
1948	146,631,302	3,637,000	1,444,337	2,192,663	24.8	9.9	15.0	2.1	3.109	32.0	67.2
1949	149,188,130	3,649,000	1,443,607	2,205,393	24.5	9.7	14.8	2.4	3.110	31.3	68.0
1950	152,271,417	3,632,000	1,452,454	2,179,546	23.9	9.5	14.3	5.9	3.091	29.2	68.2
1951	154,877,889	3,823,000	1,482,099	2,340,901	24.7	9.6	15.1	1.7	3.269	28.4	68.4
1952	157,552,740	3,913,000	1,496,838	2,416,162	24.8	9.5	15.3	1.6	3.358	28.4	68.6
1953	160,184,192	3,965,000	1,518,459	2,446,541	24.8	9.5	15.3	1.2	3.424	27.8	68.8
1954	163,025,854	4,078,000	1,481,091	2,596,909	25.0	9.1	15.9	1.5	3.543	26.6	69.6
1955	165,931,202	4,104,000	1,528,717	2,575,283	24.7	9.2	15.5	2.0	3.580	26.4	69.6
1956	168,903,031	4,218,000	1,564,476	2,653,524	25.0	9.3	15.7	1.9	3.689	26.0	69.7
1957	171,984,130	4,308,000	1,633,128	2,674,872	25.0	9.5	15.6	2.4	3.767	26.3	69.5
1958	174,881,904	4,255,000	1,647,886	2,607,114	24.3	9.4	14.9	1.7	3.701	27.1	69.6
1959	177,829,628	4,244,796	1,656,814	2,587,982	23.9	9.3	14.6	2.0	3.670	26.4	69.9
1960	180,671,158	4,257,850	1,711,982	2,545,868	23.6	9.5	14.1	1.6	3.654	26.0	69.7
1961	183,691,481	4,268,326	1,701,522	2,566,804	23.2	9.3	14.0	2.5	3.629	25.3	70.2
1962	186,537,737	4,167,362	1,756,720	2,410,642	22.3	9.4	12.9	2.3	3.474	25.3	70.1
1963	189,241,798	4,098,020	1,813,549	2,284,471	21.7	9.6	12.1	2.2	3.333	25.2	69.9
1964	191,888,791	4,027,490	1,798,051	2,229,439	21.0	9.4	11.6	2.2	3.208	24.8	70.2
1965	194,302,963	3,760,358	1,828,136	1,932,222	19.4	9.4	9.9	2.5	2.928	24.7	70.2
1966	196,560,338	3,606,274	1,863,149	1,743,125	18.3	9.5	8.9	2.6	2.736	23.7	70.2
1967	198,712,056	3,520,959	1,851,323	1,669,636	17.7	9.3	8.4	2.4	2.578	22.4	70.5
1968	200,706,052	3,501,564	1,930,082	1,571,482	17.4	9.6	7.8	2.1	2.477	21.8	70.2
1969	202,676,946	3,600,206	1,921,990	1,678,216	17.8	9.5	8.3	1.4	2.465	20.9	70.5
1970	205,052,174	3,731,386	1,921,031	1,810,355	18.2	9.4	8.8	2.8	2.480	20.0	70.8
1971	207,660,677	3,555,970	1,927,542	1,628,428	17.1	9.3	7.8	4.7	2.266	19.1	71.1
1972	209,896,021	3,258,411	1,963,944	1,294,467	15.5	9.4	6.2	4.5	2.010	18.5	71.2
1973	211,908,788	3,136,965	1,973,003	1,163,962	14.8	9.3	5.5	4.0	1.879	17.7	71.4
1974	213,853,928	3,159,958	1,934,388	1,225,570	14.8	9.0	5.7	3.4	1.835	16.7	72.0
1975	215,973,199	3,144,198	1,892,879	1,251,319	14.6	8.8	5.8	4.0	1.774	16.1	72.6
1976	218,035,164	3,167,788	1,909,440	1,258,348	14.5	8.8	5.8	3.7	1.738	15.2	72.9
1977	220,239,425	3,326,632	1,899,597	1,427,035	15.1	8.6	6.5	3.5	1.789	14.1	73.3
1978	222,584,545	3,333,279	1,927,788	1,405,491	15.0	8.7	6.3	4.2	1.760	13.8	73.5
1979	225,055,487	3,494,398	1,913,841	1,580,557	15.5	8.5	7.0	4.0	1.808	13.1	73.9
1980	227,224,681	3,612,258	1,989,841	1,622,417	15.9	8.8	7.1	2.4	1.839	12.6	73.7
1981	229,465,714	3,629,238	1,977,981	1,651,257	15.8	8.6	7.2	2.6	1.812	11.9	74.1
1982	231,664,458	3,680,537	1,974,797	1,705,740	15.9	8.5	7.4	2.1	1.827	11.5	74.5
1983	233,791,994	3,638,933	2,019,201	1,619,732	15.6	8.6	6.9	2.2	1.799	11.2	74.6
1984	235,824,902	3,669,141	2,039,369	1,629,772	15.6	8.6	6.9	1.7	1.806	10.8	74.7
1985	237,923,795	3,760,561	2,086,440	1,674,121	15.8	8.8	7.0	1.8	1.844	10.6	74.7
1986	240,132,887	3,756,547	2,105,361	1,651,186	15.6	8.8	6.9	2.3	1.837	10.4	74.7
1987	242,288,918	3,809,394	2,123,323	1,686,071	15.7	8.8	7.0	1.9	1.872	10.1	74.9
1988	244,498,982	3,909,510	2,167,999	1,741,511	16.0	8.9	7.1	1.9	1.934	10.0	74.9
1989	246,819,230	4,040,958	2,150,466	1,890,492	16.4	8.7	7.7	1.7	2.014	9.8	75.1
1990	249,622,814	4,158,212	2,148,463	2,009,749	16.7	8.6	8.1	3.2	2.081	9.2	75.4
1991	252,980,021	4,110,907	2,169,518	1,941,389	16.2	8.6	7.7	5.6	2.062	8.9	75.5
1992	256,512,810	4,065,014	2,175,613	1,889,401	15.8	8.5	7.4	6.4	2.046	8.4	75.8
1993	259,921,907	4,000,240	2,268,553	1,731,687	15.4	8.7	6.7	6.5	2.019	8.4	75.5
1994	263,126,536	3,952,767	2,278,994	1,673,773	15.0	8.7	6.4	5.8	2.001	8.0	75.7
1995	266,278,403	3,899,589	2,312,132	1,587,457	14.6	8.7	6.0	5.9	1.978	7.6	75.8
1996	269,394,284	3,891,494	2,314,690	1,576,804	14.4	8.6	5.9	5.7	1.976	7.3	76.1
1997	272,646,074	3,880,894	2,314,245	1,566,649	14.2	8.5	5.7	6.2	1.971	7.2	76.5
1998	275,854,104	3,941,553	2,337,256	1,604,297	14.3	8.5	5.8	5.8	1.999	7.2	76.7
1999	279,040,168	3,959,417	2,391,399	1,568,018	14.2	8.6	5.6	5.8	2.007	7.0	76.7
2000	282,162,411	4,058,814	2,403,351	1,655,463	14.4	8.5	5.9	5.2	2.056	6.9	76.8
2001	284,968,955	4,025,933	2,416,425	1,609,508	14.1	8.5	5.6	4.2	2.030	6.8	77.0
2002	287,625,193	4,021,726	2,443,387	1,578,339	14.0	8.5	5.5	3.7	2.020	7.0	77.0
2003	290,107,933	4,089,950	2,448,288	1,641,662	14.1	8.4	5.7	2.9	2.047	6.8	77.2
2004	292,805,298	4,112,052	2,397,615	1,714,437	14.0	8.2	5.9	3.4	2.051	6.8	77.6
2005	295,516,599	4,138,349	2,448,017	1,690,332	14.0	8.3	5.7	3.5	2.057	6.9	77.6
2006	298,379,912	4,265,555	2,426,264	1,839,291	14.3	8.1	6.2	3.4	2.108	6.7	77.8
2007	301,231,207	4,316,234	2,423,712	1,892,522	14.3	8.0	6.3	3.2	2.120	6.8	78.1
2008	304,093,966	4,247,694	2,471,984	1,775,710	14.0	8.1	5.8	3.6	2.072	6.6	78.2
2009	306,771,529	4,130,665	2,437,163	1,693,502	13.5	7.9	5.5	3.2	2.002	6.4	78.5
2010	309,327,143	3,999,386	2,468,435	1,530,951	12.9	8.0	4.9	3.3	1.931	6.1	78.7
2011	311,849,745	3,953,590	2,515,458	1,438,132	12.7	8.1	4.6	3.5	1.894	6.1	78.7
2012	314,361,094	3,952,841	2,543,279	1,409,562	12.6	8.1	4.5	3.5	1.880	6.0	78.8
2013	316,755,680	3,932,181	2,596,993	1,335,188	12.4	8.2	4.2	3.3	1.857	6.0	78.8
2014	319,297,805	3,988,076	2,626,418	1,361,658	12.5	8.2	4.3	3.7	1.862	5.8	78.9
2015	321,882,469	3,978,497	2,712,630	1,265,867	12.4	8.4	3.9	4.1	1.843	5.9	78.7
2016	324,426,311	3,945,875	2,744,248	1,201,627	12.2	8.5	3.7	4.1	1.820	5.9	78.7
2017	326,686,918	3,855,500	2,813,503	1,041,997	11.8	8.6	3.2	3.7	1.765	5.8	78.6
2018	328,571,142	3,791,712	2,839,205	952,507	11.5	8.6	2.9	2.8	1.729	5.7	78.7
2019	330,284,261	3,747,540	2,854,858	892,682	11.3	8.6	2.7	2.5	1.706	5.6	78.8
2020	331,578,104	3,613,647	3,383,729	229,918	10.9	10.2	0.7	3.2	1.641	5.4	77.0
2021	332,100,166	3,664,292	3,464,231	200,061	11.0	10.4	0.6	1.0	1.664	5.4	76.4
2022	333,996,304	3,667,758	3,279,857	387,901	11.0	9.8	1.2	4.5	1.656	5.6	77.5
2023	336,755,052	3,596,017	3,090,964	505,053	10.7	9.2	1.5	6.7	1.621	5.6	78.4
2024	340,003,797	3,628,934	3,072,666	556,268	10.7	9.0	1.7	7.9	1.599	5.5	79.0
2025p (Note: 2025 births are final. 2025 deaths are 99.9% complete, but still preliminary.)	341,784,857	3,612,012	3,096,843	515,169	10.6	9.1	1.5	3.7	1.583	5.4	

=== Current vital statistics ===
Period	Live births	Deaths	Natural increase
January–September 2025	2,718,515	2,321,722	+396,793
January–September 2026	2,676,685	2,275,694	+400,991
Difference	▼ –41,830 (−1.5%)	▼ –46,028 (−2.0%)	▲ +4,198 (+1.1%)

View source data.
View source data.
View source data.
View source data.
View source data.
View source data.
View source data.

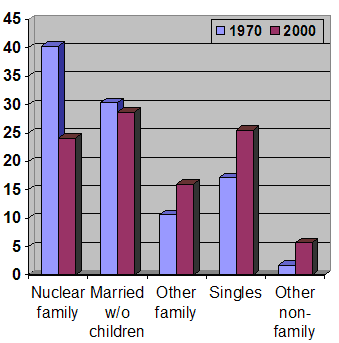
Marriages, Families and Intimate Relationships in the U.S., 1970–2000

Median age at first marriage in the U.S.

According to the U.S. Census Bureau, in 2021, the population of the United States grew at a slower rate than in any other year since the country's founding. The U.S. population grew only 0.1% from the previous year before. The U.S. population has grown by less than one million people for the first time since 1937, with the lowest numeric growth since at least 1900, when the Census Bureau began yearly population estimates. Apart from the previous few years, when population growth plummeted to historically low levels, the slowest pace of increase in the twentieth century occurred between 1918 and 1919, when the influenza epidemic and World War I were both in full swing. Slower population growth has been the norm in the United States for some years, owing to lower fertility and net international migration, as well as rising mortality from an aging population.

To put it another way, since the mid-2010s, births and net international migration have been dropping while deaths have risen. These trends have a cumulative effect of reduced population increase.

The COVID-19 pandemic has accelerated this trend, resulting in a historically slow population increase in 2021.

The growth rate is 0.1% as estimated for 2021.

The birth rate is 11.0 births/1,000 population, as of 2020. This was the lowest birth rate since records began. There were 3,613,647 births in 2020, this was the lowest number of births since 1980.

- 11.0 births/1,000 population per year (final data for 2020).
- 11.4 births/1,000 population per year (final data for 2019).

In 2020, the CDC reported that there were 1,676,911 marriages in 2020, compared to 2019, there were 2,015,603 marriages. Marriage rates varied significantly by state, ranging from 3.2 marriages/1,000 population in California to 21.0 marriages/1,000 population in Nevada.*

- 5.1 marriages/1,000 population per year (provisional data for 2020).
- 6.1 marriages/1,000 population per year (provisional data for 2019).

*Rates are based on provisional counts of marriages by state of occurrence

In 2009, Time magazine reported that 40% of births in the United States were to unmarried women. The following is a breakdown by race for unwed births: 17% Asian, 29% White, 53% Hispanics (of any race), 66% Native Americans, and 72% Black American.

According to the CDC, in 2020, there were at least 1,461,121 births to unmarried women, or 40.5% of all births in the United States. The following is a breakdown by race for unwed births: 28.4% Non-Hispanic White, 70.4% Non-Hispanic Black, and 52.8% Hispanic (of any race).

The drop in the U.S. birth rate from 2007 to 2009 is believed to be associated with the Great Recession.

A study by the Agency for Healthcare Research and Quality (AHRQ) found that more than half (51 percent) of live hospital births in 2008 and 2011 were male.

Per U.S. federal government data released in March 2011, births fell 4% from 2007 to 2009, the largest drop in the U.S. for any two-year period since the 1970s. Births have declined for three consecutive years, and are now 7% below the peak in 2007. This drop has continued through 2010, according to data released by the U.S. National Center for Health Statistics in June 2011. Numerous experts have suggested that this decline is largely a reflection of unfavorable economic conditions. This connection between birth rates and economic downturns partly stems from the fact that American birth rates have now fallen to levels that are comparable to the Great Depression of the 1930s. Teen birth rates in the U.S. are at their lowest level in U.S. history. In fact, teen birth rates in the U.S. have consistently decreased since 1991 through 2011, except for a brief increase between 2005 and 2007. The other aberration from this otherwise steady decline in teen birth rates is the 6% decrease in birth rates for 15- to 19-year-olds between 2008 and 2009. Despite these years of decrease, U.S. teen birth rates still remain higher than in other developed nations. Racial differences prevail with teen birth and pregnancy rates as well. American Indian/Alaska Native, Hispanic, and non-Hispanic Black teen pregnancy rates are more than double the non-Hispanic white teen birth rate.

Age group (2010)	Total (of population)	White alone (of race/age group)	Black alone (of race/age group)	Mixed and/or Some Other Race (of race/age group)	Asian alone (of race/age group)	Native North American (of race/age group)	Pacific Islander (of race/age group)
Total	308745538 (100%)	223553265 (72.4%)	38929319 (12.6%)	28116441 (9.1%)	14674252 (4.9%)	2932248 (1.0%)	540013 (0.2%)
0–4	20201362 (6.5%)	12795675 (5.7%/63.3%)	2902590 (7.5%/14.4%)	3315480 (11.8%/16.4%)	898011 (6.1%/4.5%)	244615 (8.3%/1.2%)	44991 (8.3%/0.2%)
5–9	20348657 (6.6%)	13293799 (5.9%/65.3%)	2882597 (7.4%/14.2%)	2957487 (10.5%/14.5%)	928248 (6.3%/4.6%)	243259 (8.3%/1.2%)	43267 (8.0%/0.0%)
10–14	20677194 (6.7%)	13737332 (6.1%/66.4%)	3034266 (7.8%/14.7%)	2736570 (9.7%/13.2%)	881590 (6.0%/4.3%)	245049 (8.4%/1.19%)	42387 (7.8%/0.2%)
15–19	22040343 (7.1%)	14620638 (6.5%/66.4%)	3448051 (8.9%/15.6%)	2704571 (9.6%/12.3%)	956028 (6.5%/4.3%)	263805 (9.0%/1.2%)	47250 (8.7%/0.2%)
20–24	21585999 (7.0%)	14535947 (6.5%/67.3%)	3111397 (8.0%/14.4%)	2538967 (9.0%/11.8%)	1106222 (7.5%/5.1%)	240716 (8.2%/1.1%)	52750 (9.8%/0.2%)
25–29	21101849 (6.8%)	14345364 (6.4%/68.0%)	2786254 (7.2%/13.2%)	2464343 (8.8%/11.7%)	1234322 (8.4%/5.9%)	221654 (7.6%/1.1%)	49912 (9.2%/0.2%)
30–34	19962099 (6.5%)	13573270 (6.1%/68.0%)	2627925 (6.8%/13.2%)	2273322 (8.1%/11.4%)	1240906 (8.5%/6.2%)	202928 (6.9%/1.0%)	43748 (8.1%/0.2%)
35–39	20179642 (6.5%)	13996797 (6.3%/69.36%)	2613389 (6.7%/13.0%)	2038408 (7.2%/10.1%)	1296301 (8.8%/6.4%)	196017 (6.7%/1.0%)	38730 (7.2%/0.2%)
40–44	20890964 (6.8%)	15052798 (6.7%/72.1%)	2669034 (6.9%/12.8%)	1782463 (6.3%/8.5%)	1155565 (7.9%/5.5%)	194713 (6.6%/0.9%)	36391 (6.7%/0.2%)
45–49	22708591 (7.4%)	17028255 (7.6%/75.0%)	2828657 (7.3%/12.5%)	1532117 (5.4%/6.8%)	1076060 (7.3%/4.7%)	207857 (7.1%/0.9%)	35645 (6.6%/0.2%)
50–54	22298125 (7.2%)	17178632 (7.7%/77.0%)	2694247 (6.9%/12.1%)	1222175 (4.3%/5.5%)	980282 (6.7%/4.4%)	191893 (6.5%/0.9%)	30896 (5.7%/0.1%)
55–59	19664805 (6.4%)	15562187 (7.0%/79.1%)	2205820 (5.7%/11.2%)	873943 (3.1%/4.4%)	844490 (5.8%/4.3%)	154320 (5.3%/0.8%)	24045 (4.5%/0.1%)
60–64	16817924 (5.4%)	13693334 (6.1%/81.4%)	1686695 (4.3%/10.0%)	611144 (2.2%/3.6%)	689601 (4.7%/4.1%)	118362 (4.0%/0.7%)	18788 (3.5%/0.1%)
65–69	12435263 (4.0%)	10313002 (4.6%/82.9%)	1162577 (3.0%/9.4%)	394208 (1.4%/3.2%)	474327 (3.2%/3.8%)	79079 (2.7%/0.6%)	12070 (2.2%/0.1%)
70–74	9278166 (3.0%)	7740932 (3.5%/83.4%)	852317 (2.2%/9.2%)	268574 (1.0%/2.9%)	354268 (2.4%/3.8%)	53926 (1.8%/0.6%)	8149 (1.5%/0.1%)
75–79	7317795 (2.4%)	6224569 (2.8%/85.1%)	616789 (1.6%/8.4%)	184596 (0.7%/2.5%)	251210 (1.7%/3.4%)	35268 (1.2%/0.5%)	5363 (1.0%/0.1%)
80–84	5743327 (1.9%)	5002427 (2.2%/87.1%)	424592 (1.1%/7.4%)	122249 (0.4%/2.1%)	168879 (1.2%/2.9%)	21963 (0.7%/0.4%)	3217 (0.6%/0.1%)
85+	5493433 (1.8%)	4858307 (2.2%/88.4%)	382122 (1.0%/7.0%)	95824 (0.3%/1.7%)	137942 (0.9%/2.5%)	16824 (0.6%/0.3%)	2414 (0.4%/0.0%)

=== Total fertility rate (TFR) ===
TFR of the United States overtime from 1820 to 2016

In 1800 the average U.S. woman had 7.04 children; by the first decade of the 1900s, this number had already decreased to 3.56. Since 1971, the birth rate has generally been below the replacement rate of 2.1. Since the Great Recession of 2007, the rate has consistently been below replacement. The drop in the TFR from 2.08 per woman in 2007 to 1.76 in 2017 was mostly due to the declining birth rate of ethnic minorities, teenagers and women in their 30s. During that period, the birthrate for women ages 35 to 44 has risen. The 12 month ending general fertility rate increased from 56.6 to 57.0 in 2022 Q1 compared to 2021 Q4.

==== Total fertility rates from 1800 to 2020 ====
The total fertility rate is the number of children born per woman. Sources: Ansley J. Coale, Zelnik and National Center for Health Statistics.

Years	1800	1810	1820	1830	1840	1850	1860	1870	1880	1890	1900
Total Fertility Rate in the United States	7.0	6.9	6.7	6.6	6.1	5.4	5.2	4.6	4.2	3.9	3.6

Years	1910	1920	1930	1940	1950	1960	1970	1980	1990	2000	2010	2020
Total Fertility Rate in the United States	3.4	3.2	2.5	2.2	3.0	3.5	2.5	1.8	2.08	2.06	1.93	1.64

The U.S. total fertility rate as of 2020 is 1.641

- 1.55 for non-Hispanic whites
- 1.71 for non-Hispanic Blacks
- 1.65 for Native Americans (including Hispanics)
- 1.53 for Asian Americans (including Hispanics)

Other:

- 1.88 for Hispanics (of all racial groups)

(Note that ≈95% of Hispanics are included as "white Hispanics" by CDC, which does not recognize the census's "Some other race" category and counts people in that category as white.)

Source: National Vital statistics report based on 2010 US census data

=== Births and fertility by race ===
A total of 3,659,289 babies were born in 2021, a 1% increase from 2020. Additionally, researchers also looked at births by race and found that White and Hispanic women each saw the number of births increase by about 2% from 2020 to 2021. Meanwhile, Black and Asian women saw the number of births decline by 2.4% and 2.5%, respectively, over the same period, while American Indian/Alaskan Native women saw their numbers fall by 3.2%. It also marks the first rise in births since 2014. Prior to this report, the total number of births had been decreasing by an average of 2% per year. However, the total fertility rate (the number of births that the average women have over their lifetimes) was 1.6635 births per every woman. This is still below the replacement level, the level a population needs to replace itself, which is, at least, 2.1 births per woman.

==== Number of births and Total Fertility rate (TFR) by state ====
2023
States	Number	TFR
Alabama	57,858	1.73
Alaska	9,015	1.83
Arizona	78,096	1.6
Arkansas	35,264	1.77
California	400,108	1.48
Colorado	61,494	1.45
Connecticut	34,559	1.52
Delaware	10,427	1.63
District of Columbia	7,896	1.2
Florida	221,410	1.6
Georgia	125,120	1.64
Hawaii	14,808	1.68
Idaho	22,397	1.79
Illinois	124,820	1.5
Indiana	79,000	1.76
Iowa	36,052	1.81
Kansas	34,065	1.81
Kentucky	51,984	1.8
Louisiana	54,927	1.83
Maine	11,627	1.4
Maryland	65,594	1.61
Massachusetts	67,093	1.4
Michigan	99,124	1.56
Minnesota	61,715	1.69
Mississippi	34,459	1.79
Missouri	67,123	1.67
Montana	11,078	1.55
Nebraska	24,111	1.91
Nevada	31,794	1.5
New Hampshire	11,936	1.38
New Jersey	101,001	1.7
New Mexico	20,951	1.55
New York	203,612	1.53
North Carolina	120,082	1.66
North Dakota	9,647	1.85
Ohio	126,896	1.68
Oklahoma	47,909	1.77
Oregon	38,298	1.35
Pennsylvania	126,951	1.55
Rhode Island	9,805	1.37
South Carolina	57,729	1.67
South Dakota	11,201	2
Tennessee	83,021	1.73
Texas	387,945	1.81
Utah	45,019	1.8
Vermont	5,065	1.3
Virginia	92,649	1.6
Washington	80,932	1.47
West Virginia	16,606	1.6
Wisconsin	59,754	1.63
Wyoming	5,990	1.68
US	3,596,017	1.62
Puerto Rico		0.90
U.S. Virgin Islands		1.40
Northern Mariana Islands		2.13
Guam		2.11

==== Number of births by country of birth of the mother (2024) ====
Mother's birth country (2024)
1. United States (75.9%)
2. Foreign countries (24.1%)

In 2024, 24.1% (873,113) of all the newborns in the US had a foreign-born mother.

Mother's Birth Country	Births (2024)
United States	2,755,821
Mexico	185,599
Guatemala	56,055
India	53,071
Honduras	43,333
El Salvador	31,942
China	29,878
Haiti	24,566
Dominican Republic	24,290
Venezuela	23,645
Cuba	21,836
Philippines	18,897
Colombia	17,323
Brazil	15,253
Ecuador	15,179
Vietnam	14,626
Nicaragua	11,206
Pakistan	10,489
Ukraine	10,480
Jamaica	9,098
Canada	8,909
Peru	8,482
Afghanistan	8,237
South Korea	8,072
Russia	7,861
Germany	7,749
Bangladesh	7,718
Nigeria	7,586
Unknown or not stated	7,555
Ethiopia	6,747
Yemen	5,470
Nepal	5,379
United Kingdom	5,206
Ghana	5,059
Japan	4,693
Thailand	4,653
Egypt	4,270
Somalia	4,059
Republic of the Congo	3,965
Iraq	3,823
Israel	3,775
Myanmar	3,702
Kenya	3,621
Uzbekistan	3,495
Cameroon	3,172
Taiwan	3,078
Iran	3,049
Jordan	3,002
Turkey	2,844
Guyana	2,801
Poland	2,730
Saudi Arabia	2,586
Albania	2,576
Morocco	2,437
Federated States of Micronesia	2,375
Romania	2,267
France	2,166
Armenia	2,123
Syria	1,963
Argentina	1,949
Italy	1,933
Central African Republic	1,793
Sudan	1,788
Liberia	1,757
Lebanon	1,739
South Africa	1,684
Moldova	1,671
Guinea	1,566
Cambodia	1,565
Marshall Islands	1,527
Algeria	1,492
Chile	1,474
Trinidad and Tobago	1,453
Bolivia	1,440
Spain	1,394
Australia	1,387
Senegal	1,378
Kazakhstan	1,341
Belarus	1,276
Bosnia and Herzegovina	1,266
Hong Kong	1,265
Costa Rica	1,263
Tanzania	1,257
Eritrea	1,254
Indonesia	1,232
Sierra Leone	1,155
Kyrgyzstan	1,138
Ivory Coast	1,072
Panama	1,043
Laos	1,013
Togo	939
Cape Verde	916
Uganda	915
Bahamas	886
Bulgaria	837
United Arab Emirates	824
Bhutan	774
Rwanda	752
Sri Lanka	749
Malaysia	699
Tajikistan	687
Gambia	681
Ireland	651
Georgia	629
Kosovo	618
Netherlands	613
Belize	611
Angola	592
Kuwait	549
Mongolia	539
Sweden	534
Mali	510
Portugal	501
Zimbabwe	500
Greece	499
North Macedonia	494
Belgium	472
Burkina Faso	470
Azerbaijan	469
Serbia	448
Burundi	437
Singapore	425
West Bank	410
Uruguay	406
Paraguay	396
Switzerland	393
Lithuania	385
Hungary	358
New Zealand	325
Fiji	325
Czech Republic	320
Benin	318
Libya	316
Tunisia	308
Croatia	282
Austria	276
Grenada	266
Zambia	263
Dominica	256
Mauritania	249
Saint Lucia	248
Yugoslavia	248
Latvia	237
Slovakia	227
Norway	217
Turkmenistan	207
Qatar	205
South Sudan	191
Soviet Union	190
Finland	176
Tonga	175
Denmark	174
Barbados	166
Samoa	165
Montenegro	153
Niger	151
Estonia	149
Central African Republic	146
Antigua and Barbuda	146
Gabon	145
Palau	138
Bahrain	133
Saint Vincent and the Grenadines	123
Djibouti	113
Suriname	113
Oman	112
Chad	108
Malawi	106
Iceland	98
Equatorial Guinea	96
Saint Kitts and Nevis	94
Bermuda	87
Mauritius	84
British Virgin Islands	68
Yugoslavia	65
Kiribati	62
Madagascar	62
Macau	60
Turks and Caicos Islands	59
United States Minor Outlying Islands	57
North Korea	55
Cyprus	51
Namibia	47
Cayman Islands	46
Botswana	45
Slovenia	42
Guadeloupe	39
Papua New Guinea	35
West Germany	34
Mozambique	31
Curaçao	29
Coral Sea Islands	27
Guinea-Bissau	23
Eswatini	23
Aruba	22
Gaza Strip	20
French Polynesia	20
Panama	19
Saint Martin	19
Luxembourg	18
Sint Maarten	15
South Vietnam	15
North Vietnam	14
Malta	12
French Guiana	12
Netherlands Antilles	12
Brunei	11
Anguilla	11

==== Number of births by race and origin ====
Quarterlies of years, recent estimates. Race and Hispanic origin refers to the mother.
General Fertility Rate: 15–44 years	2020				2021				2022		
	Q1	Q2	Q3	Q4	Q1	Q2	Q3	Q4	Q1	Q2	Q3
All races & origins	58.1	57.6	56.8	56.0	55.0	55.2	55.6	56.3	56.6	56.4	56.2
Hispanic	65.2	64.7	63.9	63.1	61.5	61.7	62.2	63.4	64.8	65.1	65.7
NH Black	61.3	61.0	60.1	59.2	57.7	57.3	57.3	57.4	57.5	57.2	56.6
NH White	55.2	54.7	54.0	53.2	52.7	53.1	53.6	54.4	54.3	53.7	53.2

Number of births and total fertility rate (number of births/mother) by race and origin
Year	Total	NH White	NH Black	Hispanic	NH Asian	NH American Indian/Alaskan Native	NH Native Hawaiian	2+
2021	3,664,292 (TFR: 1.664)	1,887,656 (TFR: 1.598)	517,889 (TFR: 1.675)	885,916 (TFR: 1.899)	213,813 (TFR: 1.351)	26,124 (TFR: 1.477)	9,531 (TFR: 2.131)	86,982 (TFR: 1.52)
2020	3,613,647 (TFR: 1.641)	1,843,432 (TFR: 1.551)	529,811 (TFR: 1.713)	866,713 (TFR: 1.879)	219,068 (TFR: 1.379)	26,813 (TFR: 1.520)	9,626 (TFR: 2.134)	
2019	3,747,540(TFR: 1.706	1,915,912 (TFR: 1.610)	548,075 (TFR: 1.775)	886,467 (TFR: 1.940)	238,769 (TFR: 1.511)	28,450 (TFR: 1.611)	9.770 (TFR: 2.178)	

Number of births, by race and Hispanic origin of the mother and month of birth: United States, January–June, final 2019 and 2020, and provisional 2021 (provisional 2021 data is based on 99.92% of births)
Race and Hispanic origin of mother and year	January–June	January	February	March	April	May	June	Total pop.'s percent (January–June)
Non-Hispanic White (2019)	937,741	156,819	142,992	157,502	156,516	165,587	158,325	51.67%
Non-Hispanic White (2020)	916,986	152,519	138,756	155,981	150,953	156,888	156,933	51.43%
Non-Hispanic White (2021)	914,813	142,083	138,803	159,055	153,980	156,969	163,923	52.32%
Non-Hispanic Black (2019)	262,114	47,486	41,497	43,583	42,151	44,584	42,813	14.45%
Non-Hispanic Black (2020)	259,759	46,356	40,587	43,591	41,395	42,999	43,381	14.57%
Non-Hispanic Black (2021)	245,753	41,310	38,628	41,952	39,810	40,936	43,117	14.05%
Non-Hispanic American Indian or Alaska native (2019)	14,013	2,525	2,182	2,332	2,293	2,382	2,299	0.77%
Non-Hispanic American Indian or Alaska native (2020)	13,234	2,292	1,977	2,213	2,195	2,240	2,246	0.74%
Non-Hispanic American Indian or Alaska native (2021)	12,498	2,135	1,932	2,181	2,098	1,961	2,191	0.69%
Non-Hispanic Asian (2019)	116,289	19,628	17,975	19,910	19,261	20,168	19,347	6.41%
Non-Hispanic Asian (2020)	110,811	19,303	17,068	19,268	17,986	18,696	17,880	6.21%
Non-Hispanic Asian (2021)	102,279	15,658	15,410	18,019	17,482	17,552	18,158	5.85%
Non-Hispanic Hawaiian or other Pacific Islander (2019)	4,695	790	762	814	738	847	744	0.26%
Non-Hispanic Hawaiian or other Pacific Islander (2020)	4,665	803	759	794	705	820	757	0.26%
Non-Hispanic Hawaiian or other Pacific Islander (2021)	4,413	799	616	753	731	806	708	0.25%
Hispanic (of any race) (2019)	421,991	73,742	65,667	70,442	68,517	72,747	70,876	23.26%
Hispanic (of any race) (2020)	420,563	73,601	65,140	70,361	68,000	70,085	71,050	23.59%
Hispanic (of any race) (2021)	409,941	65,687	61,961	70,060	68,202	70,722	73,309	23.44%
All races and origins (2019)	1,814,497	310,872	279,963	304,237	298,947	316,386	304,092	
All races and origins (2020)	1,783,124	304,722	272,907	301,625	290,478	301,481	302,164	
All races and origins (2021)	1,748,768	276,980	266,107	302,137	292,454	299,308	311,782	

Percent change in births from 2019 to 2020 and 2020–2021
Race and Hispanic origin of mother and year	January–June	January	February	March	April	May	June
Non-Hispanic White (2019–2020)	−2	−3	−3	−1	−4	−5	−1
Non-Hispanic White (2020–2021)	†0	−7	†0	2	2	†0	4
Non-Hispanic Black (2019–2020)	−1	−2	−2	†0	−2	−4	†1
Non-Hispanic Black (2020–2021)	−5	−11	−5	−4	−4	−5	†−1
Non-Hispanic American Indian or Alaska native (2019–2020)	−6	−9	−9	†−5	†−4	−6	†−2
Non-Hispanic American Indian or Alaska native (2020–2021)	−6	−7	†−2	†−1	†−4	−12	†−2
Non-Hispanic Asian (2019–2020)	−5	†−2	−5	−3	−7	−7	−8
Non-Hispanic Asian (2020–2021)	−8	−19	−10	−6	−3	6	†2
Non-Hispanic Hawaiian or other Pacific Islander (2019–2020)	†−1	†2	†0	†−2	†−4	†−3	†2
Non-Hispanic Hawaiian or other Pacific Islander (2020–2021)	5	†0	−19	†−5	†4	†−2	†−6
Hispanic (of any race) (2019–2020)	†0	†0	†−1	†0	†−1	−4	†0
Hispanic (of any race) (2020–2021)	−3	−11	−5	†0	†0	†1	3
All races and origins (2019–2020)	−2	−2	−3	−1	−3	−5	−1
All races and origins (2020–2021)	−2	−9	−2	†0	1	−1	3

==== U.S.-born residents ====
Note: Hispanics are counted both by their ethnicity and by their race, giving a higher overall number. Also note that growth arrows indicate an increase or decrease in the number of births, not in the fertility rate.

Birth Data Annum	Mother Race	White	> NH White	Black	> NH Black	NH Asian	NH Native North American	NH Pacific Islander	Total
2016	#	2,900,933	2,056,332	623,886	558,622	254,471	31,452	9,342	3,945,875
2016	%	73.50%	52.10%	15.80%	14.20%	6.50%	0.80%	0.20%	100%
2016	TFR	1.77	1.719	1.9	1.832	1.69	1.794	2.076	1.82
2017	#	2,812,267	1,992,461	626,027	560,715	249,250	29,957	9,426	3,855,500
2017	%	72.90%	51.70%	16.20%	14.50%	6.50%	0.80%	0.20%	100%
2017	TFR	1.76	1.666	1.92	1.824	1.597	1.702	2.085	1.765
2018	#	2,788,439	1,956,413	600,933	552,029	240,798	29,092	9,476	3,791,712
2018	%	73.50%	51.60%	15.80%	14.60%	6.40%	0.80%	0.30%	100%
2018	TFR	1.75	1.64	1.87	1.792	1.525	1.651	2.106	1.729
2019	#		1,915,912		548,075	238,769	28,450	9,770	3,747,540
2019	%		51.10%		14.60%	6.40%	0.76%	0.26%	100%
2019	TFR		1.611		1.776	1.511	1.612	2.178	1.706
2020	#		1,843,432		529,811	219,068	26,813	9,626	3,613,647
2020	%		51.00%		14.70%	6.10%	0.74%	0.26%	100%
2020	TFR		1.552		1.714	1.385	1.517	2.142	1.641
2020–2016			−10.35%		−5.16%	−13.90%	−14.75%	+3.04%	-9.84%

Key:

- NH = Non-Hispanic.
- TFR = Total fertility rate (number of children born per woman).
- Signs (+/−) indicate an increase or decrease in the number of births, not in the fertility rate, comparing to the previous year.

	Mother Ethnicity	Non Hispanic	Hispanic
2016	#(k)	3,027	918
2016	%	76.70%	23.30%
2016	TFR		2.093
2017	#(k)	2,957	899
2017	%	76.70%	23.30%
2017	TFR		2.007
2018	#(k)	2,906	886
2018	%	76.60%	23.40%
2018	TFR		1.959
2019	#(k)	2,861	886
2019	%	76.30%	23.70%
2019	TFR		1.94
2020	#(k)	2,747	867
2020	%	76.00%	24.00%
2020	TFR		1.876
	2020–2016	–	−5.63%

Foreign-born total fertility rate by race and those of Hispanic origin
Race	2008	2011	2013
White	2.29	2.01	1.94
Black	2.51	2.57	2.35
Asian	2.25	2.02	1.93
Other	1.80	2.04	2.06
Hispanic (of any race)	3.15	2.77	2.46
Total	2.75	2.45	2.22

==== Percent of births to White Non-Hispanic women that were their 8th+ child, by U.S. state, in 2021 ====
Percent of births to White Non-Hispanic women that were their 8th+ child, by U.S. state, in 2021
State	Percent
New York	2.21%
New Jersey	1.7%
Wisconsin	1.04%
Arkansas	1.02%
Montana	0.86%
Ohio	0.85%
Iowa	0.84%
Pennsylvania	0.82%
Kansas	0.76%
Kentucky	0.76%
Utah	0.75%
Minnesota	0.75%
Indiana	0.72%
Wyoming	0.72%
Mississippi	0.7%
Michigan	0.7%
Idaho	0.65%
West Virginia	0.64%
Arizona	0.62%
North Dakota	0.59%
South Dakota	0.54%
Arkansas	0.51%
New Mexico	0.50%
Maryland	0.49%
Oregon	0.46%
Michigan	0.44%
Oklahoma	0.44%
Florida	0.43%
Tennessee	0.42%
Virginia	0.41%
Illinois	0.40%
Nevada	0.40%
West Virginia	0.39%
Delaware	0.38%
(Georgia (U.S. state)) Georgia	0.36%
Nebraska	0.36%
Texas	0.33%
Alabama	0.33%
Missouri	0.32%
Vermont	0.31%
South Carolina	0.30%
California	0.29%
Colorado	0.29%
North Carolina	0.25%
Alaska	0.25%
Connecticut	0.20%
New Hampshire	0.19%
Massachusetts	0.17%

=== Mother's mean age at first birth ===
Percentage of women childless by age cohort in the U.S. over time

- 27.1 years (2020 est.)

=== Life expectancy ===
Life expectancy in the United States since 1880

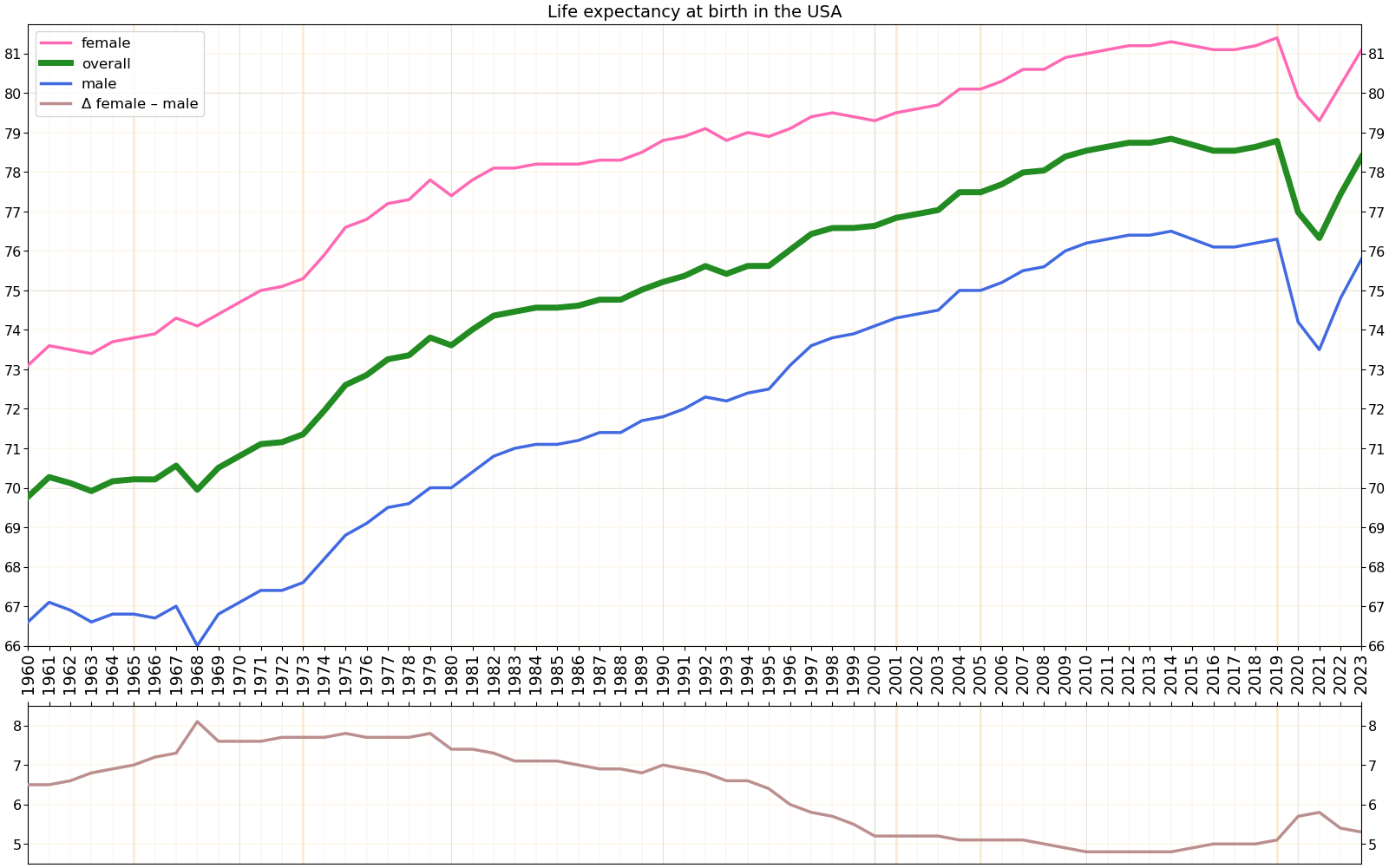
Life expectancy in the United States since 1960 by gender

According to the Centers for Disease Control and Prevention (CDC), average American life expectancy at birth was 79.0 years in 2024, a record high. This was a gain of 0.6 years from 78.4 years in 2023. Average life expectancy was 76.4 years in 2021.

- Male: 76.5 (2024), 75.8 years (2023), 74.8 years (2022), 73.5 years (2021)
- Female: 81.4 years (2024), 81.1 years (2023), 80.2 years (2022), 79.3 years (2021)

Starting in 1998, life expectancy in the U.S. fell behind that of other wealthy industrialized countries, and Americans' "health disadvantage" gap has been increasing ever since. Average U.S. life expectancy in the United States has actually declined in four of the years following 2014 (the year when average U.S. life expectancy reached 78.9 years, its historical peak). These declines were mostly reversed in 2022 (+1.1 years), 2023 (+0.9 years), and 2024 (+0.6 years). The CDC attributed the improvement in 2024 to a significant fall in the number of fatal drug overdoses, adding that "heart disease continues to be the leading cause of death in the United States, followed by cancer and unintentional injuries." As of 2024, death rates among the youngest in the U.S. remain well higher than in peer nations. In 2023, there had already been lower death rates in each of the ten U.S. leading causes of death, with gains in life expectancy largely driven by "decreases in mortality due to COVID-19, heart disease, unintentional injuries, cancer and diabetes".

From 2019 to 2020, the COVID-19 pandemic had contributed to approximately 61% of the decrease in life expectancy in the United States. While increases in mortality from unintentional injuries, heart disease, homicide, and diabetes contributed to 11.7%, 5.8%, 2.9%, and 2.8% of the decrease in life expectancy from 2019 to 2020, respectively. Life expectancy has also varied by racial and ethnic group, with Non-Hispanic Asians having the highest life expectancy and Non-Hispanic American Indians having the lowest. In 2021, life expectancy at birth in the United States fell for the second year in a row, the first two-year drop since 1961–1963.

Life expectancy at birth by Hispanic origin and race, and sex: United States, 2019, 2020 & 2021
Race	Males 2021	Females 2021	Total 2021*	Total 2020	Total 2019	2019 to 2021 ▲/▼
NH White	73.7	79.2	76.4	77.4	78.8	▼2.4
NH Black	66.7	74.8	70.8	71.5	74.8	▼4.0
NH Asian	81.2	85.6	83.5	83.6	85.6	▼2.1
NH American Indian or Alaska Native	61.5	69.2	65.2	67.1	71.8	▼6.6
Hispanic	74.4	81.0	77.7	77.9	81.9	▼4.2
All origins and races	73.2	79.1	76.1	77.0	78.8	▼2.7

NOTE: Data regarding life expectancy at birth for 2021 are provisional.*

- NH = Non-Hispanic.
- LEB = Life expectancy at birth
- Growth arrows (▲/▼) indicate an increase or decrease in total life expectancy compared to years before.

==== Life expectancy at birth from 1901 to 2015 ====
Life expectancy in the United States from 1901 to 2015. Source: Our World In Data and the United Nations.

1901–1950

Decades/Year on decade	1	2	3	4	5	6	7	8	9	10
Life expectancy in the United States(1900s)	49.3	50.5	50.6	49.6	50.3	50.2	50.1	51.9	52.8	51.8
Life expectancy in the United States(1910s)	53.4	54.1	53.5	54.6	55.1	54.2	54.0	47.0	55.3	55.4
Life expectancy in the United States(1920s)	58.2	58.1	57.5	58.5	58.5	57.9	59.4	58.3	58.5	59.6
Life expectancy in the United States(1930s)	60.3	61.0	60.9	60.2	60.9	60.4	61.1	62.4	63.1	63.2
Life expectancy in the United States(1940s)	63.8	64.6	64.3	65.1	65.6	66.3	66.7	67.3	67.6	68.1

1901–2015

Period	Life expectancy in Years
1901–1909	49.3 – 52.8
1910–1919	53.5 – 55.3
1920–1929	55.4 – 59.4
1930–1939	60.2 – 63.1
1940–1949	63.8 – 67.6
1950–1955	68.7
1955–1960	69.7
1960–1965	70.1
1965–1970	70.4
1970–1975	71.4
1975–1980	73.3
1980–1985	74.4
1985–1990	74.9
1990–1995	75.7
1995–2000	76.5
2000–2005	77.2
2005–2010	78.2
2010–2015	78.9
2015–2020	78.8
2022	77.5
2023	78.4
2024	79.0

Source: UN World Population Prospects

=== Life tables ===
Life table of the United States, 2020
	Females		Males		Total	
Age	Cohort	Life expectancy	Cohort	Life expectancy	Cohort	Life expectancy
0	100,000	79.9	100,000	74.2	100,000	77.0
1	99,508	79.3	99,415	73.6	99,461	76.4
5	99,429	75.3	99,313	69.7	99,377	72.5
10	99,381	70.4	99,254	64.7	99,323	67.5
15	99,317	65.4	99,155	59.8	99,242	62.6
20	99,157	60.5	98,741	55.0	98,952	57.7
25	98,876	55.7	97,961	50.5	98,415	53.0
30	98,479	50.9	96,994	45.9	97,725	48.4
35	97,933	46.2	95,815	41.5	96,856	43.8
40	97,215	41.5	94,420	37.0	95,794	39.3
45	96,266	36.9	92,731	32.7	94,471	34.8
50	94,928	32.4	90,497	28.4	92,680	30.4
55	92,979	28.0	87,332	24.3	90,115	26.2
60	90,111	23.8	82,736	20.5	86,376	22.2
65	86,039	19.8	76,439	17.0	81,181	18.5
70	80,547	15.9	68,491	13.7	74,466	14.9
75	72,737	12.4	58,588	10.6	65,565	11.6
80	61,298	9.2	45,661	7.8	53,346	8.6
85	45,424	6.5	30,276	5.5	37,700	6.1
90	26,271	4.4	14,824	3.7	20,477	4.2
95	9,599	2.9	4,216	2.5	6,889	2.8
100	1,727	2.0	549	1.8	1,142	2.0

== Future projections ==
In 2023, the U.S. Census Bureau published an updated projection of the U.S. population for 2023–2100, taking into account the results of the 2020 census. The future size and composition of the U.S. population were estimated using the cohort-component method and historical trends in fertility, mortality, and international migration. The projection included a main variant and three alternative variants reflecting different international migration scenarios ("high immigration", "low immigration", and "zero immigration"), since immigration is the most uncertain component in population forecasting.

View source data.

Observed and Total Population for the States, 2030-2040
states	2030	2040
Alabama	5,029,833	5,056,796
Alaska	792,188	819,954
Arizona	8,238,407	9,166,279
Arkansas	3,155,798	3,217,535
California	43,751,116	46,467,001
Colorado	6,766,983	7,692,907
Connecticut	3,601,202	3,542,707
Delaware	1,082,192	1,164,344
District of Columbia	888,891	1,058,820
Florida	25,372,664	28,886,983
(Georgia (U.S. state)) Georgia	11,835,126	12,820,271
Hawaii	1,548,831	1,619,703
Idaho	2,008,329	2,227,842
Illinois	12,709,901	12,397,564
Indiana	6,978,254	7,095,000
Iowa	3,317,412	3,392,783
Kansas	3,011,782	3,032,653
Kentucky	4,648,190	4,714,761
Louisiana	4,945,783	5,062,780
Maine	1,344,841	1,326,159
Maryland	6,553,548	6,842,902
Massachusetts	7,420,882	7,742,628
Michigan	10,068,941	9,960,115
Minnesota	6,070,551	6,364,886
Mississippi	3,003,963	2,962,160
Missouri	6,318,126	6,359,970
Montana	1,163,353	1,236,304
Nebraska	2,089,841	2,190,918
Nevada	3,591,043	4,058,371
New Hampshire	1,385,799	1,393,451
New Jersey	9,363,317	9,470,012
New Mexico	2,132,823	2,127,318
New York	20,638,066	20,873,488
North Carolina	11,673,849	12,658,927
North Dakota	923,452	1,060,457
Ohio	11,837,405	11,751,540
Oklahoma	4,253,604	4,439,038
Oregon	4,738,074	5,164,041
Pennsylvania	12,946,245	12,809,150
Rhode Island	1,068,663	1,055,318
South Carolina	5,792,247	6,352,502
South Dakota	973,361	1,043,032
Tennessee	7,395,106	7,823,662
Texas	34,738,482	40,015,913
Utah	3,786,963	4,344,339
Vermont	617,969	601,865
Virginia	9,331,666	9,876,728
Washington	8,746,493	9,776,126
West Virginia	1,746,577	1,661,849
Wisconsin	5,971,617	5,997,137
Wyoming	605,972	615,787

== Race, ethnicity, & other groups ==

Racial groups in the United States (2020 census) including racial identification of Hispanic
1. White Americans (61.6%)
2. Black Americans (12.4%)
3. Two or more races (10.2%)
4. Some other race (8.40%)
5. Asian Americans (6.00%)
6. Native Americans (1.10%)
7. Pacific Islander Americans (0.20%)
Hispanics and Non-Hispanics in the United States (2020 United States census)
1. Non-Hispanic Americans (81.3%)
2. Hispanic Americans (18.7%)

The following table shows the race and ethnicity of the United States per the 1930, 1970, 2000, and 2020 censuses. Data only covers states and the federal district, thus only covering the first 48 states and Washington, D.C. in 1930 and including Alaska and Hawaii as well in 1970, 2000, and 2020. The figures thus do not include various other territories that have been under the United States during this time period. (Note: including Alaska (1930), American Samoa (1930, 1970, 2000, 2020), Guam (1930, 1970, 2000, 2020), Hawaii (1930), Northern Mariana Islands (2000, 2020), Panama Canal Zone (1930, 1970), Philippines (1930), Puerto Rico (1930, 1970, 2000, 2020), Trust Territory of the Pacific Islands (1970), Virgin Islands (1930, 1970, 2000, 2020), and various largely uninhabited Minor Outlying Islands) Over this time period, the U.S. has changed from being 89% White, 10% Black and 1% Hispanic in 1930 to 58% White, 12% Black, and 19% Hispanic ninety years later, reflecting a significant demographic shift.

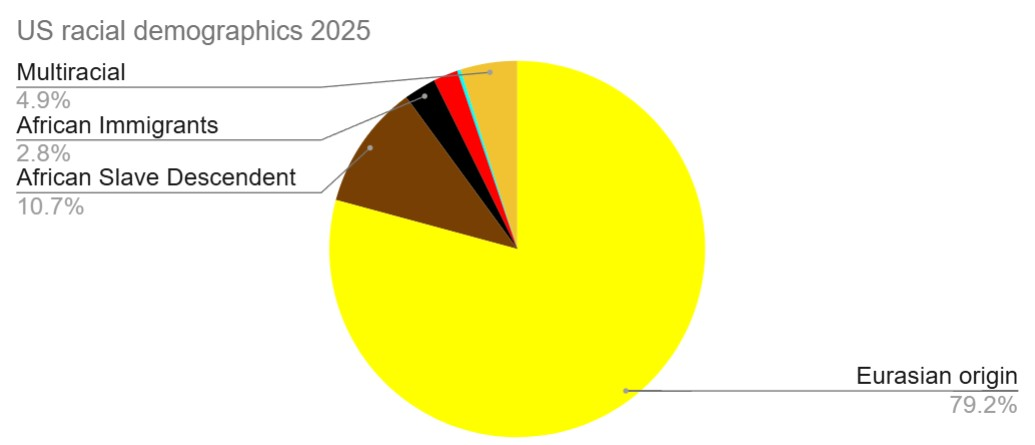

Race and ethnicity in the United States (1930−2020)
Ethnicity	1930		1970		2000		2020		2025	
Ethnicity	Pop.	%	Pop.	%	Pop.	%	Pop.	%	Pop.	%
White	108,864,207	88.67%	169,282,849	83.3%	194,552,774	69.13%	230,290,960	69.48%	247,110,452	72.3%
Hispanic (Note: Not enumerated in 1930. "Persons of Spanish origin" in 1970.)	1,422,533 (Note: Includes 1,422,533 "Mexican" responses.)	1.16%	9,072,602	4.46%	35,305,818	12.55%				
African Descendent of Slaves (Note: "Negro" in 1930 and 1970.)	11,891,143	9.69%	22,125,355	10.89%	33,947,837	12.06%	38,257,001	11.5%	36,707,693	10.74%
African Immigrants							2,847,199	0.86%	9,433,262	2.76%
Asian (Note: Not enumerated in 1930 or 1970.)	264,100 (Note: Includes 74,954 "Chinese", 138,834 "Japanese", 45,208 "Filipino", 3,130 "Hindu", 1,860 "Korean", 96 "Malay", and 18 "Siamese" responses.)	0.22%	1,965,249 (Note: All Americans not of the "White", "Black", or "Indian" races who did not identify as "of Spanish origin".)	0.97%	10,123,169	3.6%	19,886,049	6.0%	23,583,155	6.9%
Native (Note: "Indian" in 1930 and 1970.)	332,397	0.27%	765,871	0.38%	2,068,883	0.74%	3,727,135	1.1%	7,177,482	2.1%
Pacific Islander (Note: Not enumerated in 1930 or 1970.)					353,509	0.13%	689,966	0.23%	1,025,354	0.3%
Multiracial (usually white influenced) (Note: Not enumerated in 1930 or 1970.)					5,069,916	1.81%	35,937,073	10.83%	16,747,458	4.9%
Total responses	122,775,046	100%	203,211,926	100%	281,421,906	100%	331,449,281	100%	341,784,857	100%

Racial Hispanic groups in the United States (2020 United States census)
1. Multiracial (32.7%)
2. White (20.3%)
3. Native (2.38%)
4. African (1.87%)
5. Asian (0.43%)
6. Islander (0.11%)
7. Others (42.2%)

Hispanic Americans in 2020
Year	Population	% of Hispanics	% of the US	Percent Change
Multiracial	20,299,960	32.70%	6.12%	▲567.2%
White (alone)	12,579,626	20.26%	3.80%	▼ −52.9%
Native (alone)	1,475,436	2.38%	0.45%	▲115.3%
African (alone)	1,163,862	1.87%	0.35%	▼ −6.2%
Asian (alone)	267,330	0.43%	0.08%	▲27.8%
Pacific Islander (alone)	67,948	0.11%	0.02%	▲16.3%
Some Other Race (alone)	26,225,882	42.25%	7.91%	▲41.7%
Total	62,080,044	100%	18.73%	
Source: 2020 United States census

U.S. race by Hispanic origin demographics from 1940 to 2020

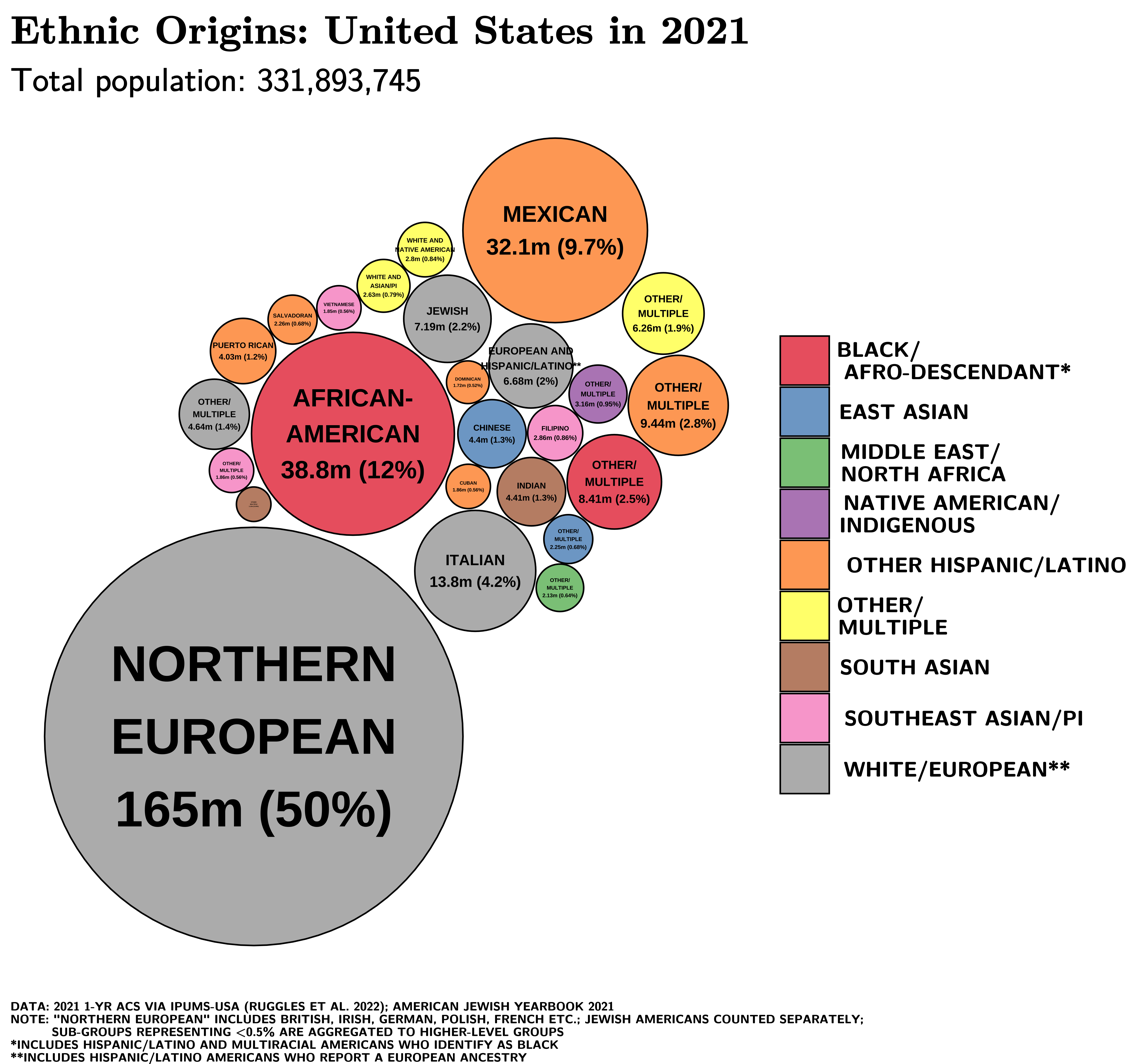
Ethnic origins in the United States

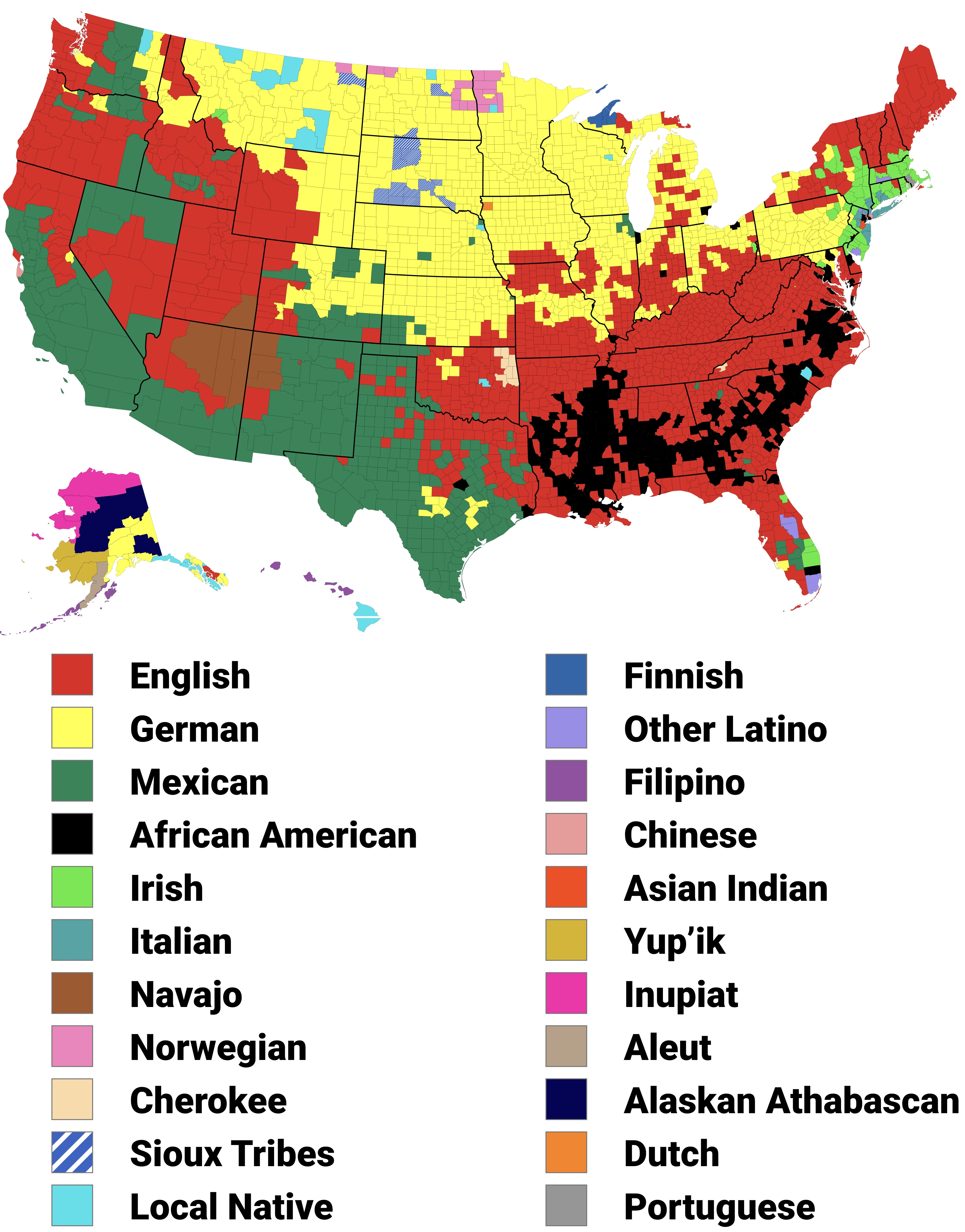
Largest alone or in any combination ethnic origin by county in the United States, per the 2020 census

Ethno-racial makeup of the United States by single year ages from 1990 to 2020

Ethno-racial makeup of the United States by single year ages in 2020

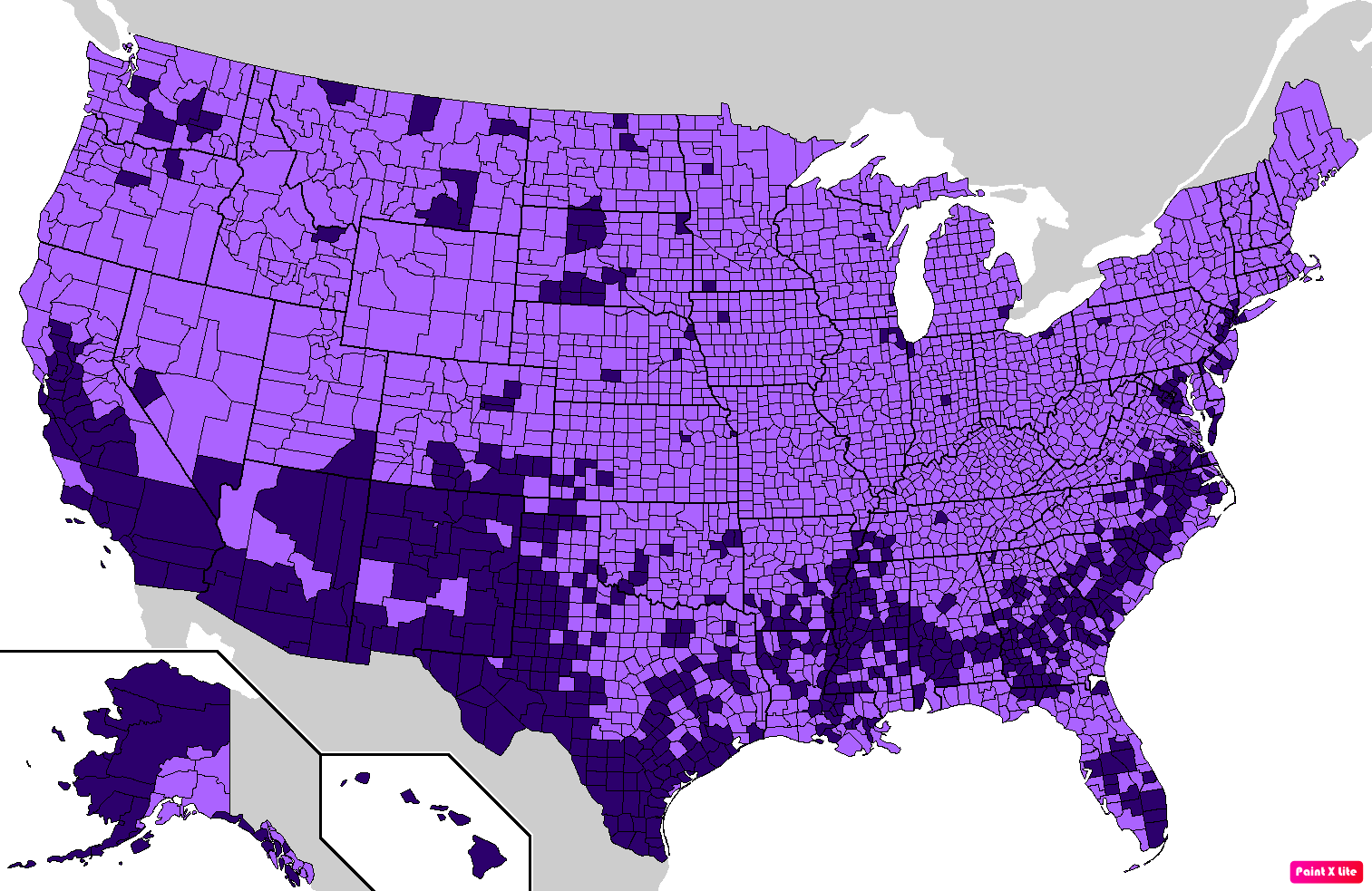
United States Counties by % of population which is Non-Hispanic White (NHW) according to the U.S. Census Bureau American Community Survey 2013–2017 5-Year Estimates. Counties with >40% NHW are in full purple.

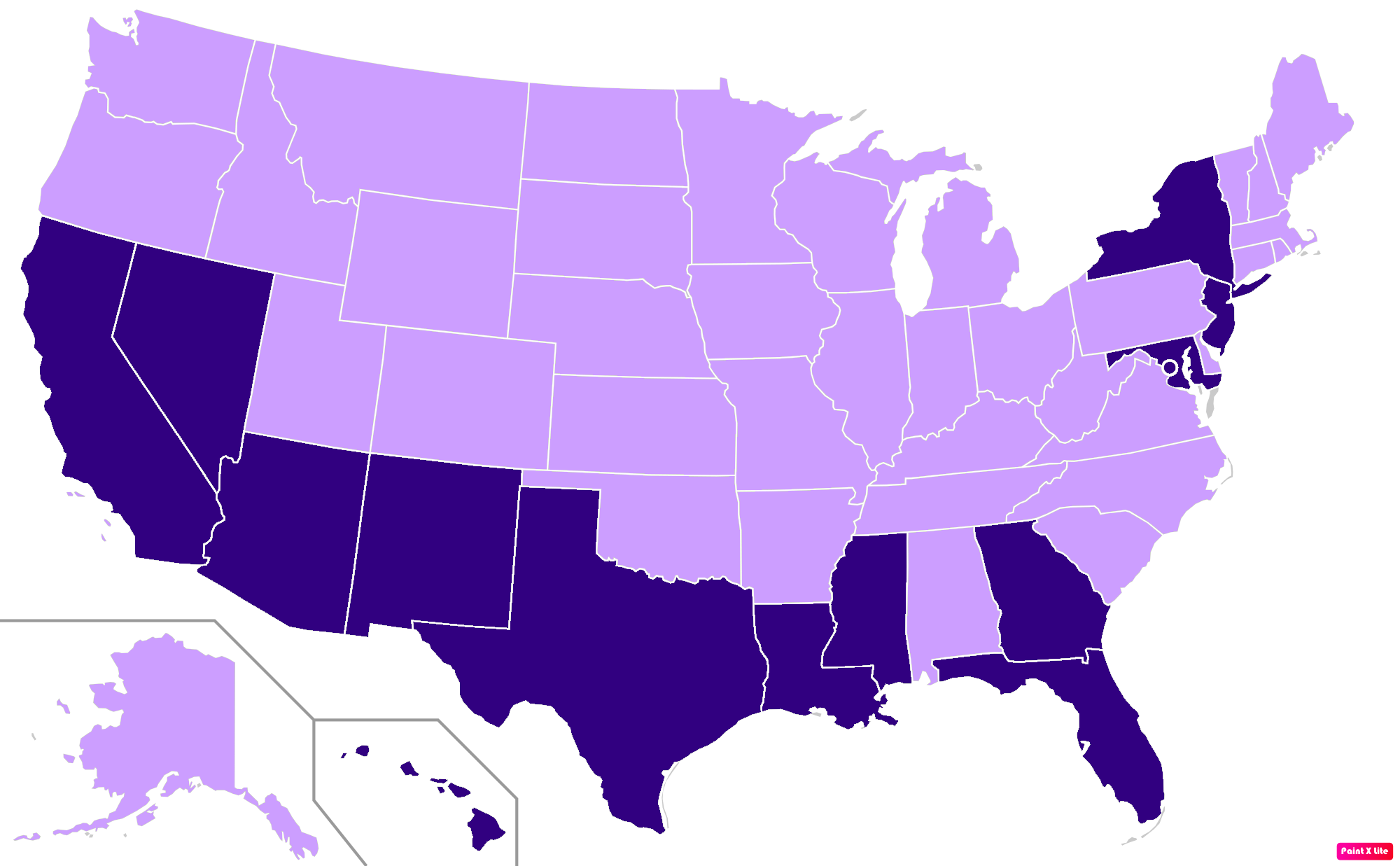
States in the United States by NHW % according to the U.S. Census Bureau American Community Survey 2013–2017 5-Year Estimates. States >40% NHW are in full purple.

=== Race ===
Population pyramid by race/ethnicity in 2020

The United States Census Bureau collects racial data in accordance with guidelines provided by the U.S. Office of Management and Budget (OMB), and these data are based on self-identification. Many other countries count multiple races based on origin while America compiles multiple dozens of ethnicity groups into skin color grouping them together. The racial classifications and definitions used by the U.S. Census Bureau are:

- White: a person having origins in any of the original peoples of Europe, the Middle East, or North Africa. It includes people who indicate their race as "White" or report entries such as English, Azerbaijani, Iranian (Kurd and Lur), Irish, German, Italian, Spanish, Portuguese, Greek, Turkish, Lebanese, Moroccan (Arab and Berber), or Caucasian.
- Black or African American: a person having origins in any of the Black racial groups of Africa. It includes people who indicate their race as "Black, African Am." or report entries such as African American, Kenyan, Nigerian, or Haitian.
- American Indian or Alaska Native: a person having origins in any of the original peoples of North and South America (including Central America) and who maintains tribal affiliation or community attachment. This category includes people who indicate their race as "American Indian or Alaska Native" or report entries such as Navajo, Blackfeet, Inupiat, Yup'ik, Central American Indian groups, or South American Indian groups.
- Asian: a person having origins in any of the original peoples of East Asia, Southeast Asia, or South Asia, such as Cambodia, China, India, Japan, Korea, Malaysia, Pakistan, the Philippine Islands, Thailand, and Vietnam.
- Native Hawaiian or Other Pacific Islander: a person having origins in any of the original peoples of Hawaii, Guam, Samoa, or other Pacific Islands.
- Some other race: includes all other responses not included in the "White", "Black or African American", "American Indian or Alaska Native", "Asian", and "Native Hawaiian or other Pacific Islander" racial categories described above includes Asians from West Asia or Russia (non-European Russia) and White Africans.
- Two or more races: people may choose to provide two or more races either by checking two or more race response check boxes, providing multiple responses, or some combination of check boxes and other responses.
View source data.

Data about race and ethnicity are self-reported to the Census Bureau. Since the 2000 census, Congress has authorized people to identify themselves according to more than one racial classification by selecting more than one category. Only one ethnicity may be selected, however, because the Census Bureau recognizes only two ethnicities – "Hispanic or Latino" and "Not Hispanic or Latino" – which are mutually exclusive since you can be one or the other, but not both. The singular term Hispanic has been supplanted as a federally-recognized ethnicity by the combined "Hispanic or Latino," defined by the Census Bureau as a person of Cuban, Mexican, Puerto Rican, Cuban, South or Central American, or other Spanish culture or origin, regardless of race.

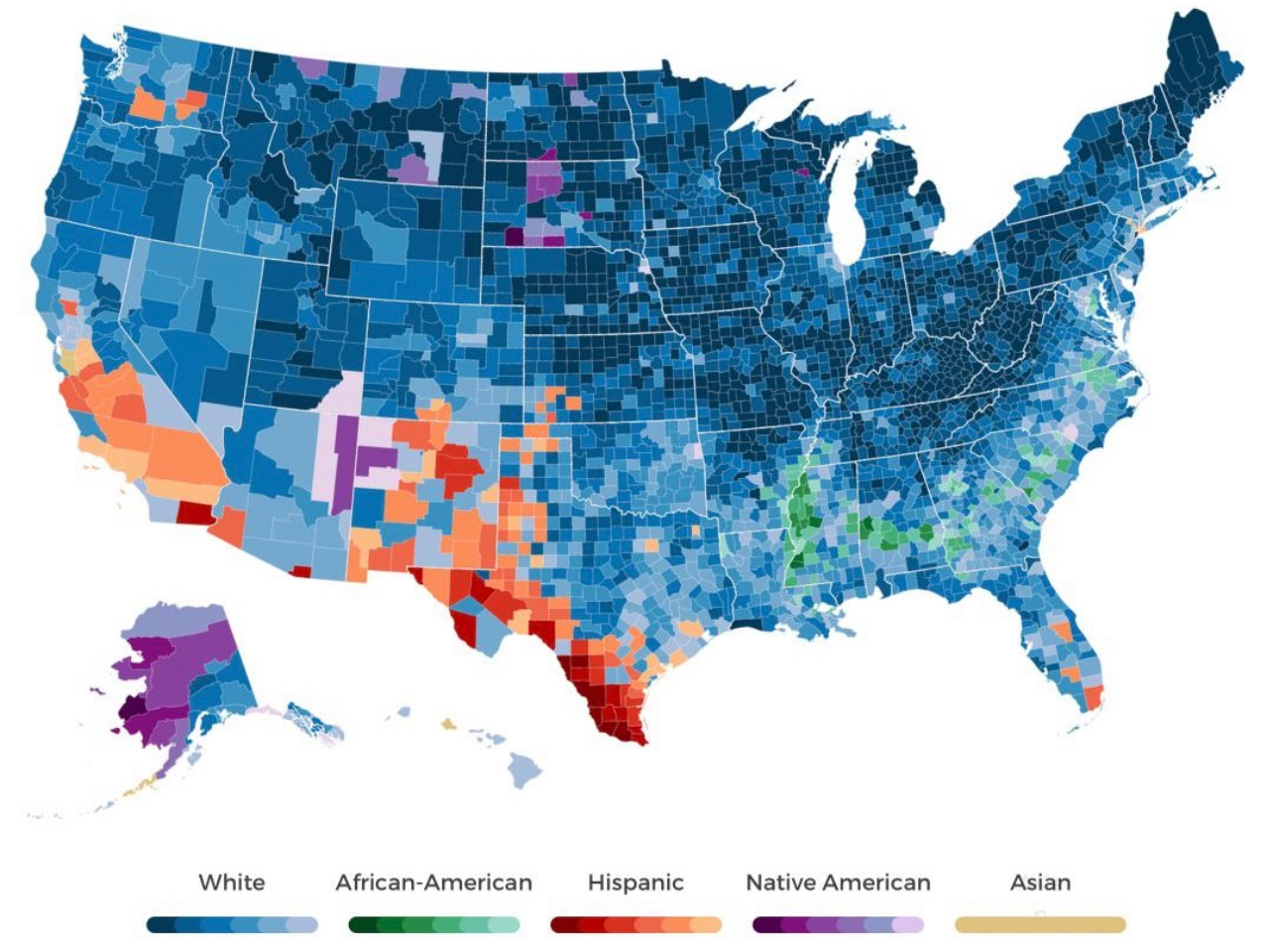
Map of counties in United States by racial and ethnic plurality, per the 2020 U.S. census

According to the Census Bureau website, the racial composition of the United States in 2021 was:

Race (2021)	Population	% of population
Total	323,175,700	100.0%
(Non-Hispanic) White	187,925,100	58.2%
(Non-Hispanic) Black or African American	37,520,800	11.6%
Hispanic or Latino	61,241,900	19.0%
(Non-Hispanic) Asian	18,558,600	5.7%
(Non-Hispanic) North American Native	1,667,100	0.5%
(Non-Hispanic) Pacific Islander	541,200	0.2%
Two or more Races	15,711,100	4.9%

According to the 2022 American Community Survey, the racial composition of the United States in 2022 was:

Race	Population (2022 est.)	% of total
Total	333,287,550	100%
One race	291,505,262	87.5%
White	202,889,020	60.2%
Black or African American	40,603,656	12.2%
American Indian and Alaska Native	3,205,331	1%
Asian	19,696,980	5.9%
Native Hawaiian and Other Pacific Islander	665,807	0.2%
Other races	24,444,482	7.3%
Two or more races	41,782,288	12.5%
White and Black or African American	3,831,683	1.1%
White and American Indian and Alaska Native	3,012,849	0.9%
White and Asian	2,865,504	0.9%
Black or African American and American Indian and Alaska Native	464,679	0.1%
White and Some Other Race	26,317,236	7.9%
Hispanic or Latino (of any race)	63,553,640	19.1%
Mexican	37,414,772	11.2%
Central American	6,531,267	2%
Puerto Rican	5,905,178	1.8%
South American	4,666,970	1.4%
Cuban	2,435,573	0.7%
Dominican	2,396,784	0.7%
Other Hispanic or Latino	4,203,095	1.3%
Not Hispanic or Latino	269,733,920	80.9%
White (non-Hispanic)	192,153,070	57.7%
Black or African American (non-Hispanic)	39,582,960	11.9%
American Indian and Alaska Native (non-Hispanic)	1,750,489	0.5%
Asian (non-Hispanic)	19,415,252	5.8%
Native Hawaiian and Other Pacific Islander (non-Hispanic)	590,339	0.2%
Some other race (non-Hispanic)	1,912,680	0.6%
Two or more races	14,329,127	4.3%

United States in racial groups (of one race)

White Americans

African Americans

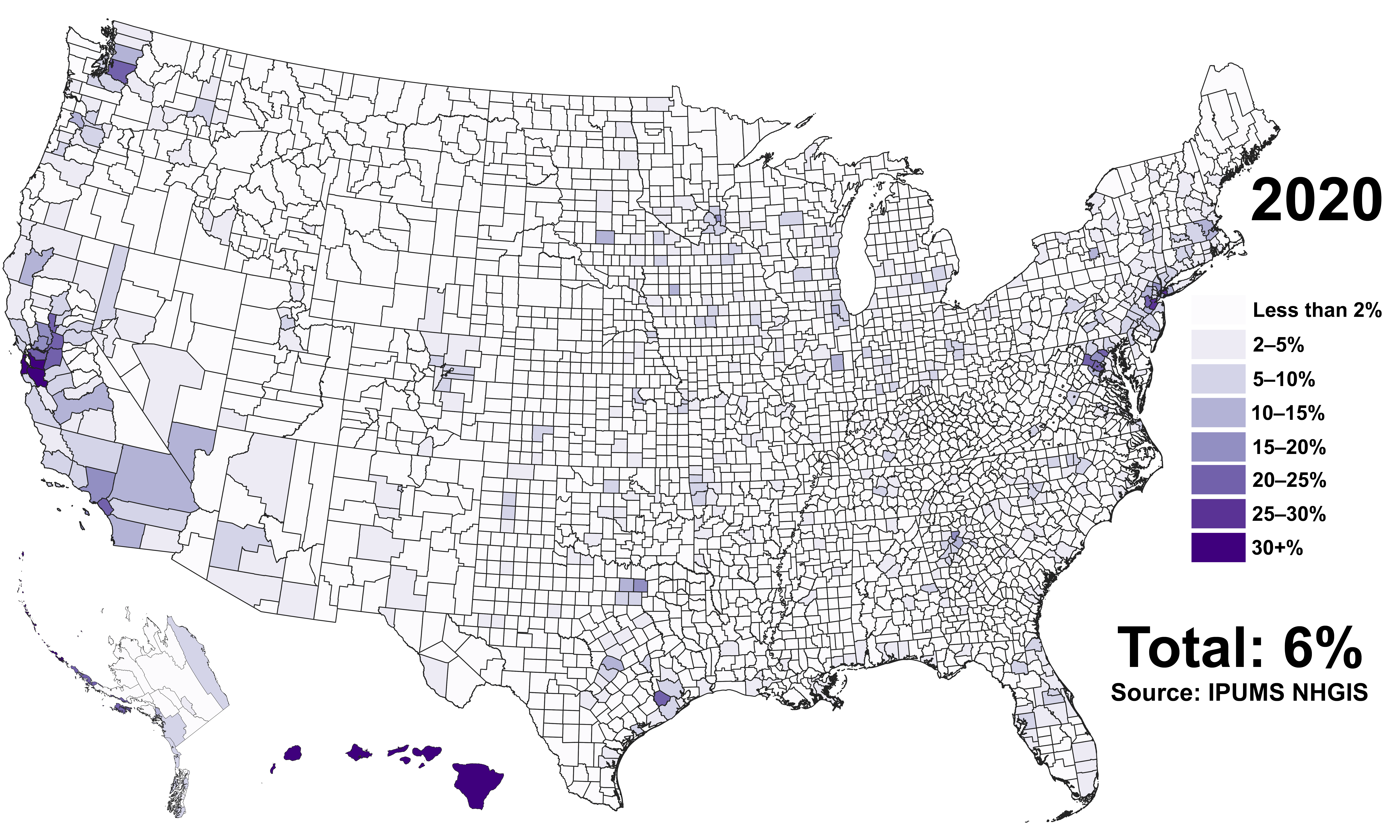
Asian Americans
United States in ethnic groups

Non-Hispanic White Americans

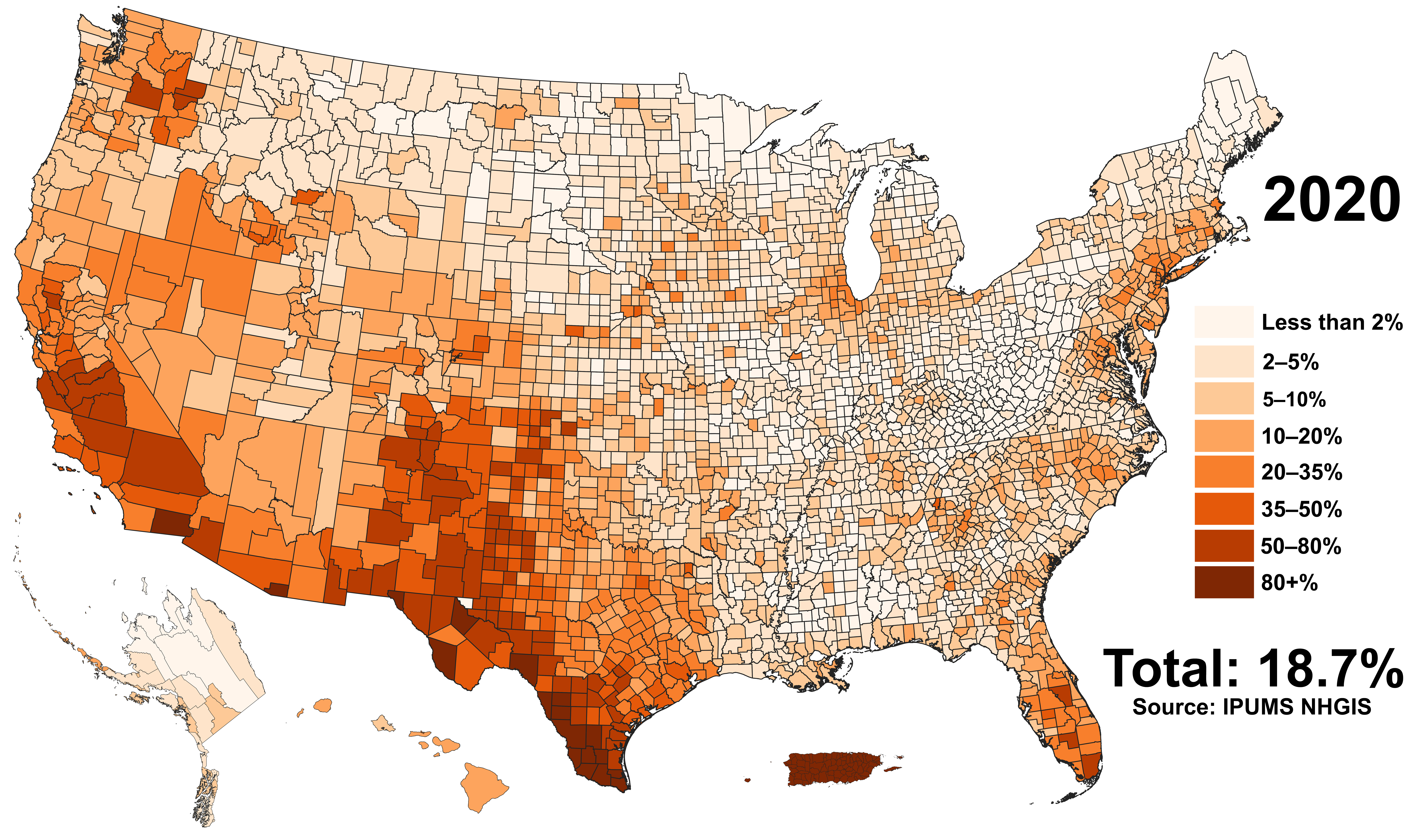
Hispanic Americans

Distribution of Total Population by Race, 1900 to 2020 (in %)

Hispanic are shown like part of the races. Source: U.S. Census Bureau.

Years	1900	1910	1920	1930	1940	1950	1960	1970	1980	1990	2000*	2010*	2020*
White	87.9	88.9	89.7	89.8	89.8	89.5	88.6	87.5	83.0	80.3	75.1	72.4	61.6
Black or African American	11.6	10.7	9.9	9.7	9.8	10.0	10.5	11.1	11.7	12.1	12.3	12.6	12.4
American Indian and Alaska Native									0.8	0.8	0.9	0.9	1.1
Asian and Native Hawaiian and other Pacific Islander									1.5	2.9	3.8	5.0	6.2
Some other race									3.0	3.9	5.5	6.2	8.4
Two or more races											2.4	2.9	10.2
Sum (%)	99.5	99.6	99.6	99.5	99.6	99.5	99.1	98.6	100	100	100	100	100

^{*}Data are shown for the White, Black or African American, American Indian and Alaska Native, Asian and Native Hawaiian and Other Pacific Islander, and Some other race alone populations.

Median age by each race alone and ethnicity, 2021

Source: United States Census Bureau.

Race	Median age (yrs)		
Race	Average	Male	Female
Total Population	38.8	37.7	39.8
White (Non-Hispanic)	43.8	42.6	45.0
Black or African American (Non-Hispanic)	34.5	32.9	36.1
Native North American (Non-Hispanic)	32.1	31.8	32.5
Asian (Non-Hispanic)	37.7	36.5	38.9
Pacific Islander (Non-Hispanic)	32.7	32.5	32.9
Two or More Races	29.5 (2020)	20.4	21.8
Hispanic alone	30.5	30.2	30.8
Not Hispanic	41.0	39.8	42.1

Median age by race alone or in combination and ethnicity, 2021

Source: United States Census Bureau.

Race	Median age (yrs)		
Race	Average	Male	Female
White (include White Hispanics)	39.8	38.9	40.8
Black or African American	32.7	31.2	34.2
Native Northern American	31.6	30.9	32.2
Asian	35.4	34.1	36.6
Pacific Islander	29.8	29.3	30.3
White (excludes White Hispanics)	42.8	41.7	44.0

Most common age by race/ethnicity, 2018
Race/ethnicity	White	Black or African American	Hispanic	Asian		Pacific Islander	Multiracial
Most common age	58 yo	27 yo	11 yo	29 yo	26 yo	28 yo	3 yo

Racial breakdown of population by state (plus D.C. and Puerto Rico), 2015
Subdivision	Pop	White	Black/African American	Native Northern American	Asian	Pacific Islander	Other	2+
AL	4,830,620	68.8%	26.4%	0.5%	1.2%	0.1%	1.3%	1.7%
AK	733,375	66.0%	3.4%	13.8%	5.9%	1.2%	1.3%	8.4%
AZ	6,641,928	78.4%	4.2%	4.4%	3.0%	0.2%	6.5%	3.2%
AR	2,958,208	78.0%	15.5%	0.6%	1.4%	0.2%	2.1%	2.1%
CA	38,421,464	61.8%	5.9%	0.7%	13.7%	0.4%	12.9%	4.5%
CO	5,278,906	84.2%	4.0%	0.9%	2.9%	0.1%	4.3%	3.5%
CT	3,593,222	77.3%	10.3%	0.2%	4.2%	0.0%	5.1%	2.8%
DE	926,454	69.4%	21.6%	0.3%	3.6%	0.0%	2.3%	2.7%
DC	647,484	40.2%	48.9%	0.3%	3.7%	0.0%	4.2%	2.7%
FL	19,645,772	76.0%	16.1%	0.3%	2.6%	0.1%	2.5%	2.4%
GA	10,006,693	60.2%	30.9%	0.3%	3.6%	0.0%	2.8%	2.1%
HI	1,406,299	25.4%	2.0%	0.2%	37.7%	9.9%	1.1%	23.7%
ID	1,616,547	91.7%	0.6%	1.3%	1.3%	0.1%	2.4%	2.6%
IL	12,873,761	72.3%	14.3%	0.2%	5.0%	0.0%	5.8%	2.2%
IN	6,568,645	84.2%	9.2%	0.2%	1.9%	0.0%	2.3%	2.2%
IA	3,093,526	91.2%	3.2%	0.3%	2.0%	0.1%	1.3%	2.0%
KS	2,892,987	85.2%	5.8%	0.8%	2.6%	0.1%	2.2%	3.3%
KY	4,397,353	87.6%	7.9%	0.2%	1.3%	0.0%	0.9%	2.1%
LA	4,625,253	62.8%	32.1%	0.6%	1.7%	0.0%	1.0%	1.8%
ME	1,329,100	95.0%	1.1%	0.6%	1.1%	0.0%	0.2%	2.0%
MD	5,930,538	57.6%	29.5%	0.3%	6.0%	0.0%	3.6%	3.0%
MA	6,705,586	79.6%	7.1%	0.2%	6.0%	0.0%	4.2%	2.9%
MI	9,900,571	79.0%	14.0%	0.5%	2.7%	0.0%	1.1%	2.6%
MN	5,419,171	84.8%	5.5%	1.0%	4.4%	0.0%	1.5%	2.7%
MS	2,988,081	59.2%	37.4%	0.4%	1.0%	0.0%	0.9%	1.2%
MO	6,045,448	82.6%	11.5%	0.4%	1.8%	0.1%	1.1%	2.4%
MT	1,014,699	89.2%	0.5%	6.5%	0.7%	0.1%	0.5%	2.5%
NE	1,869,365	88.1%	4.7%	0.9%	2.0%	0.1%	1.9%	2.2%
NV	2,798,636	69.0%	8.4%	1.1%	7.7%	0.6%	8.8%	4.4%
NH	1,324,201	93.7%	1.3%	0.2%	2.4%	0.0%	0.5%	1.8%
NJ	8,904,413	68.3%	13.5%	0.2%	9.0%	0.0%	6.4%	2.5%
NM	2,084,117	73.2%	2.1%	9.1%	1.4%	0.1%	10.9%	3.3%
NY	19,673,174	64.6%	15.6%	0.4%	8.0%	0.0%	8.6%	2.9%
NC	9,845,333	69.5%	21.5%	1.2%	2.5%	0.1%	3.0%	2.4%
ND	721,640	88.7%	1.6%	5.3%	1.2%	0.0%	0.8%	2.2%
OH	11,575,977	82.4%	12.2%	0.2%	1.9%	0.0%	0.8%	2.5%
OK	3,849,733	73.1%	7.2%	7.3%	1.9%	0.1%	2.6%	7.8%
OR	3,939,233	85.1%	1.8%	1.2%	4.0%	0.4%	3.4%	4.1%
PA	12,779,559	81.6%	11.0%	0.2%	3.1%	0.0%	2.0%	2.1%
PR	3,583,073	69.7%	8.4%	0.3%	0.3%	0.0%	12.0%	9.3%
RI	1,053,661	81.1%	6.5%	0.5%	3.2%	0.0%	5.8%	2.8%
SC	4,777,576	67.2%	27.5%	0.3%	1.4%	0.1%	1.5%	2.0%
SD	843,190	85.0%	1.6%	8.6%	1.2%	0.0%	0.9%	2.6%
TN	6,499,615	77.8%	16.8%	0.3%	1.6%	0.1%	1.5%	2.0%
TX	26,538,614	74.9%	11.9%	0.5%	4.2%	0.1%	6.0%	2.5%
UT	2,903,379	87.6%	1.1%	1.1%	2.2%	0.9%	4.5%	2.6%
VT	626,604	94.9%	1.1%	0.3%	1.4%	0.0%	0.3%	1.9%
VA	8,256,630	69.0%	19.2%	0.3%	6.0%	0.1%	2.2%	3.2%
WA	6,985,464	77.8%	3.6%	1.3%	7.7%	0.6%	3.8%	5.2%
WV	1,851,420	93.6%	3.3%	0.2%	0.7%	0.0%	0.2%	2.0%
WI	5,742,117	86.5%	6.3%	0.9%	2.5%	0.0%	1.7%	2.1%
WY	579,679	91.0%	1.1%	2.2%	0.9%	0.1%	2.1%	2.7%

Racial and Ethnic breakdown of population by state (plus D.C. and Puerto Rico), 2022
		Not Hispanic							
Subdivision	Pop	White	Black/African American	Native North American	Asian	Pacific Islander	Other	2+	Hispanic or Latino
AL	5,074,296	64.1%	25.6%	0.3%	1.5%	0.0%	0.4%	3.3%	4.9%
AK	733,583	57.4%	2.8%	12.7%	6.1%	2.0%	0.5%	10.7%	7.7%
AZ	7,359,197	51.8%	4.4%	3.3%	3.5%	0.2%	0.5%	3.9%	32.5%
AR	3,045,637	67.5%	14.3%	0.4%	1.6%	0.5%	0.4%	7.0%	8.4%
CA	39,029,344	33.7%	5.2%	0.3%	15.3%	0.3%	0.6%	4.3%	40.3%
CO	5,839,926	65.0%	3.8%	0.4%	3.1%	0.1%	0.5%	4.6%	22.5%
CT	3,626,205	62.0%	9.8%	0.1%	4.8%	0.0%	0.8%	4.4%	18.2%
DE	1,018,396	58.9%	21.6%	0.1%	4.1%	0.0%	0.5%	4.5%	10.3%
DC	671,803	36.7%	41.7%	0.2%	4.1%	0.1%	0.6%	5.0%	11.7%
FL	22,244,824	50.8%	14.6%	0.1%	2.8%	0.0%	0.7%	3.9%	27.1%
GA	10,912,876	49.6%	30.7%	0.1%	4.4%	0.1%	0.5%	4.2%	10.4%
HI	1,440,196	20.7%	1.6%	0.1%	34.6%	9.3%	0.4%	22.1%	11.1%
ID	1,939,033	79.0%	0.6%	0.8%	1.3%	0.2%	0.5%	4.2%	13.5%
IL	12,582,032	58.5%	13.2%	0.1%	5.9%	0.0%	0.4%	3.6%	18.3%
IN	6,833,037	76.0%	9.2%	0.1%	2.5%	0.0%	0.5%	3.9%	7.8%
IA	3,200,517	82.8%	3.7%	0.2%	2.3%	0.3%	0.3%	3.6%	6.8%
KS	2,937,150	73.1%	5.0%	0.4%	2.9%	0.1%	0.5%	4.9%	13.0%
KY	4,512,310	82.2%	7.6%	0.1%	1.4%	0.1%	0.3%	4.2%	4.2%
LA	4,590,241	56.7%	30.9%	0.4%	1.8%	0.0%	0.4%	4.0%	5.7%
ME	1,385,340	90.2%	1.6%	0.4%	1.2%	0.0%	0.4%	4.2%	2.1%
MD	6,164,660	47.1%	29.2%	0.1%	6.5%	0.0%	0.8%	4.7%	11.4%
MA	6,981,974	67.0%	6.6%	0.1%	7.2%	0.0%	1.2%	4.9%	13.0%
MI	10,034,118	72.6%	13.1%	0.3%	3.3%	0.0%	0.5%	4.5%	5.7%
MN	5,717,184	76.2%	6.9%	0.7%	5.2%	0.0%	0.6%	4.5%	5.8%
MS	2,940,057	55.3%	36.5%	0.4%	0.9%	0.0%	0.3%	3.3%	3.3%
MO	6,177,957	76.6%	10.6%	0.2%	2.1%	0.1%	0.4%	5.1%	4.7%
MT	1,122,867	83.5%	0.3%	5.2%	0.7%	0.1%	0.8%	4.9%	4.4%
NE	1,967,923	75.8%	4.5%	0.5%	2.5%	0.1%	0.4%	3.9%	12.3%
NV	3,177,772	44.4%	9.0%	0.6%	8.8%	0.6%	0.6%	5.7%	30.3%
NH	1,395,231	86.6%	1.3%	0.1%	2.6%	0.1%	0.5%	4.4%	4.5%
NJ	9,261,699	51.5%	12.0%	0.1%	10.0%	0.0%	1.0%	3.6%	21.9%
NM	2,113,344	34.8%	1.7%	8.1%	1.7%	0.0%	0.4%	3.1%	50.2%
NY	19,677,152	52.9%	13.4%	0.2%	9.0%	0.0%	1.1%	3.7%	19.7%
NC	10,698,973	60.7%	20.1%	0.9%	3.2%	0.1%	0.5%	4.1%	10.4%
ND	779,261	82.0%	3.3%	4.3%	1.6%	0.4%	0.4%	3.7%	4.4%
OH	11,756,058	76.1%	11.9%	0.1%	2.5%	0.0%	0.4%	4.5%	4.4%
OK	4,019,800	62.6%	6.7%	6.8%	2.3%	0.1%	0.3%	9.1%	12.1%
OR	4,240,137	71.6%	1.8%	0.7%	4.5%	0.4%	0.6%	6.0%	14.4%
PA	12,972,008	73.1%	10.1%	0.1%	3.8%	0.0%	0.5%	3.8%	8.6%
PR	3,221,789	0.6%	0.1%	0.0%	0.1%	0%	0.1%	0.1%	99.0%
RI	1,093,734	68.2%	4.7%	0.1%	3.4%	0.0%	0.9%	5.2%	17.6%
SC	5,282,634	62.5%	24.9%	0.2%	1.7%	0.0%	0.6%	3.6%	6.5%
SD	909,824	79.9%	2.0%	7.1%	1.4%	0.1%	0.3%	4.5%	4.7%
TN	7,051,339	71.9%	15.5%	0.1%	1.9%	0.1%	0.4%	4.0%	6.3%
TX	30,029,572	38.9%	11.7%	0.2%	5.4%	0.1%	0.4%	3.2%	40.2%
UT	3,380,800	75.6%	1.0%	0.7%	2.4%	1.1%	0.4%	3.5%	15.1%
VT	647,064	90.2%	1.0%	0.2%	1.8%	0.0%	0.4%	4.2%	2.3%
VA	8,683,619	58.7%	18.4%	0.1%	6.9%	0.1%	0.7%	4.7%	10.4%
WA	7,785,786	63.5%	3.8%	0.9%	9.7%	0.7%	0.7%	6.7%	14.0%
WV	1,775,156	89.8%	3.3%	0.1%	0.7%	0.0%	0.3%	3.8%	1.9%
WI	5,892,539	79.0%	5.9%	0.6%	2.9%	0.0%	0.3%	3.7%	7.6%
WY	581,381	81.4%	0.7%	1.6%	0.6%	0.1%	0.9%	3.9%	10.8%

Racial breakdown of population in the Insular Areas, 2010
Territory	Population (2010 est.)	White	Black or African American	Native Anglo North American	Asian	Pacific Islander	Multiracial
American Samoa	55,519	0.9%	0.0%	—	3.6%	92.6%	2.8%
Guam	159,358	7.1%	1.0%	—	32.2%	49.3%	9.7%
Northern Mariana Islands	53,883	2.1%	0.1%	—	49.9%	34.9%	12.9%
U.S. Virgin Islands	106,405	15.6%	76.0%	—	1.4%	0.0%	7.0%

U.S. Births by race/ethnicity in 2018
Year	White Alone	Black Alone	Hispanic	Native Anglo North American Alone	Asian Alone	Pacific Islander Alone
2018	51.6%	14.6%	23.4%	0.8%	6.4%	0.3%

Percentage distribution of the U.S. resident population 5 to 17 years old, by race/ethnicity: 2000 and 2017
Year	White	Black or African American	Hispanic	Asian	Pacific Islander	Native Anglo North American	Multi racial
2000	60%	15%	16%	3%	—	1%	2%
2017	51%	14%	25%	5%	—	1%	4%

Percentage distribution of the U.S. resident population 18 to 24 years old, by race/ethnicity: 2000 and 2017
Year	White	Black or African American	Hispanic	Asian	Pacific Islander	Native Anglo North American	Multi racial
2000	62%	14%	18%	4%	—	1%	1%
2017	54%	14%	22%	6%	—	1%	3%

Percentage of population between non-Hispanic whites and Minority by age group, 2013
Age group	85+	80–84	75–79	70–74	65–69	60–64	55–59	50–54	45–49	40–44	35–39	30–34	25–29	20–24	15–19	10–14	5–9	<5
non-Hispanic white	83%	81%	79%	78%	77%	74%	72%	69%	65%	61%	58%	57%	57%	56%	55%	54%	52%	50%
Minority	17%	19%	21%	22%	23%	26%	28%	31%	35%	39%	42%	43%	43%	44%	45%	46%	48%	50%

=== Hispanic or Latino origin ===
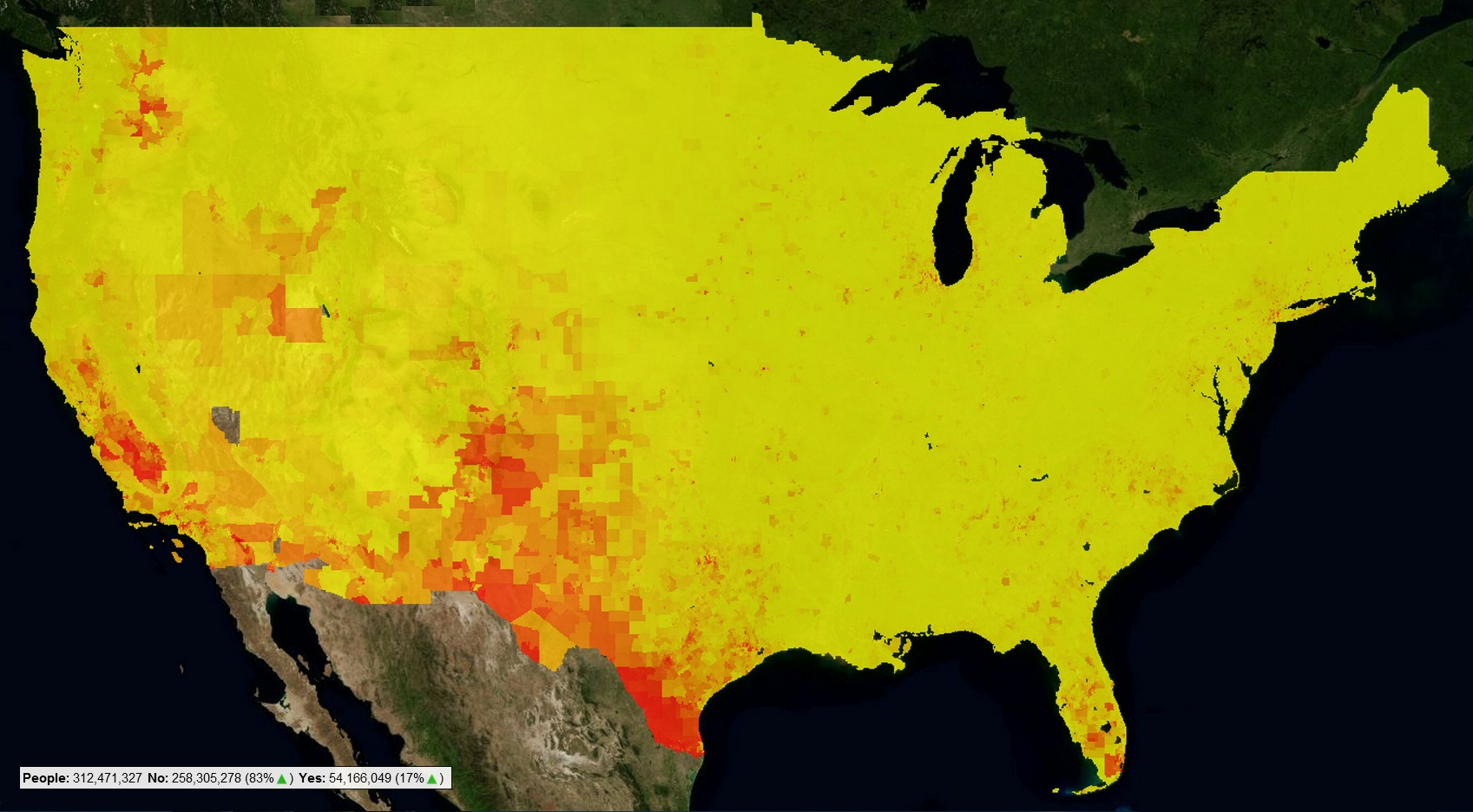
CensusViewer US 2010 census Latino Population as a heatmap by census tract

The U.S. Office of Management and Budget (OMB) defines "Hispanic or Latino" as a person of Cuban, Mexican, Puerto Rican, Dominican, South or Central American, or other Spanish culture or origin regardless of race. People who identify with the terms "Hispanic" or "Latino" are those who classify themselves in one of the specific Hispanic or Latino categories listed on the decennial census questionnaire and various Census Bureau survey questionnaires – "Mexican, Mexican Am., Chicano" or "Puerto Rican" or "Cuban" – as well as those who indicate that they are "another Hispanic, Latino, or Spanish origin". People who identify their origin as Hispanic or Latino may be of any race.

Hispanic or Latino and Race	Population (2022 est.)	Percentage of total population
United States population	333,287,550	100%
Hispanic or Latino (of any race)	63,553,640	19.1%
White	10,735,941	3.2%
Black or African American	1,020,695	0.3%
Native Anglo North American	1,454,842	0.4%
Asian	181,231	0.1%
Pacific Islander	75,468	0.0%
Multiracial	49,984,964	15.0%
Not Hispanic or Latino	269,733,920	80.9%

Population distribution by Hispanic origin 1970–2020 (in %)

Source: U.S. Census Bureau, decennial census of population, 1970 (5-percent sample), 1980 to 2020.

Years	1970	1980	1990	2000	2010	2020
Not Hispanic or Latino	95.5	93.6	91.0	87.5	83.7	81.3
Hispanic or Latino	4.5	6.4	9.0	12.5	16.3	18.7
Total (%)	100	100	100	100	100	100

Median age of each race alone, 2021 (Hispanic)

Source: United States Census Bureau.

Race	Median age (yrs)					
Race	Alone			Combination		
Race	Average	Male	Female	Average	Male	Female
Total (Hispanic)	30.5	30.2	30.8	30.5	30.2	30.8
White	31.2	30.9	31.5	30.9	30.6	31.1
Black or African American	27.1	26.1	28.2	25.3	24.3	26.3
Native Anglo North American	28.4	29.0	27.8	27.6	27.8	27.3
Asian	26.9	26.2	27.7	23.0	22.3	23.7
Pacific Islander	27.8	28.3	27.2	24.8	24.9	24.7
Two or More Races	21.5	21.1	22.0	N/A		

Note: Hispanic origin is considered an ethnicity, not a race. Hispanics may be of any race.

=== Indigenous peoples ===
As of 2020, there are 9,666,058 people identifying as American Indian and Alaska Native people in the United States, including those identifying with more than one race, representing around 3% of the U.S. population. This number includes not only groups indigenous to the United States, but any Indigenous people of the Americas, including Mesoamerican peoples such as the Maya, as well as Canadian and South American natives. In 2022, 634,503 Indigenous people in the United States identified with Central American Indigenous groups, 875,183 identified with the Indigenous people of Mexico, and 47,518 identified with Canadian First Nations. Of the 3.2 million Americans who identified as American Indian or Alaska Native alone in 2022, around 45% were of Hispanic or Latino ethnicity, with this number growing as increasing numbers of Indigenous people from Latin American countries immigrate to the U.S. and more Latinos self-identify with indigenous heritage. Of groups Indigenous to the contiguous United States, the largest self-reported tribes are Cherokee (1,449,888), Navajo (434,910), Choctaw (295,373), Blackfeet (288,255), and Sioux (220,739). Additionally, 205,954 identify with an Alaska Native tribe. There are 573 federally recognized tribal governments in the United States.

The U.S. Census Bureau classifies Native Hawaiians separately from American Indians and Alaska Natives, grouping them with Pacific Islanders instead. According to 2022 estimates, 714,847 Americans identified with Native Hawaiian ancestry.

=== Other groups ===
==== Veterans ====
There were 15.8 million veterans in 2023, with 6.2% of Americans having served in the Armed Forces. In 2023 the war with the highest number of veterans was the Korean War. Most veterans were male at 14 million and 1.7 million veterans were female. Currently the veteran population in the United States is getting smaller but more diverse. The racial makeup of veterans was in 2023 as follows: 74.1% white, 12.6% African-American, 10.3% other/mixed-race, 2.2% Asian/Native Hawaiian/Pacific Islander and 0.8% being Native American. Veterans have a lower poverty and unemployment than non-veterans but have higher rates of disability than non-veterans.

==== Undocumented immigrants ====
In 2010, The Washington Post estimated that there were 11 million undocumented immigrants living in the country. In 2017, the Pew Research Center reported an estimated 10.5 million undocumented immigrants in the U.S. In 2025, Pew announced that "the number of unauthorized immigrants in the United States reached an all-time high of 14 million in 2023 after two consecutive years of growth".

==== Prisoners ====
In 2024, an estimated 1,867,404 adults were imprisoned in the United States according to the 2024 American Community Survey.

In 2016 it was reported that 92.7% of all prisoners were male, 6.9% female, 0.3% transgender, and 0.1% nonbinary. In 2022, there were 180,684 women incarcerated in U.S. prisons and jails. Most women involved in the country's correctional system were actually under probation, with 717,811 being so classified. Female parolees numbered 76,870, while 87,874 women were held in prisons and 92,900 women were held in jails in 2022.

Some 37% of all federal prisoners were Hispanic, 32% Black/African American, 21% white, and 2% Native American or Alaska Native. Asians, Native Hawaiians and other Pacific islanders made up 2% of the population, while "nearly 7% of federal prisoners identified as two or more races". In state prisons, 34% identified as Black/African American, 32% white, 21% Hispanic, 1% Native American or Alaskan Native, 1% as being either Asian/Native Hawaiian/Other Pacific Islander, and 11% "identified with two or more races".

==== LGBTQ Population ====
The United States Census Bureau does not measure sexual orientation but plans are in place to start measuring it starting in 2027 with the American Community Survey. In 2024, Gallup reported that 9.3% of adults were LGBTQ. The percentage of people who have reported being LGBTQ has risen during the 2010s and 2020s. Of LGBTQ adults in the United States, the most common identification was bisexual, with 56.3% of LGBTQ adults identifying as bisexual; bisexual people made up 5.2% of the adult U.S. population. The survey also reported that 13.9% of LGBTQ adults were transgender and made up 1.3% of the U.S. adult population.

In the 2020 United States census, there were more reported same-sex married couples than unmarried ones as there were 668,497 married same-sex couples and 500,073 unmarried same-sex couples.

In June 2023, UCLA's Williams Institute reported that there were approximately 823,000 same-sex couples in the United States. Also according to the institute, most same-sex couples were female at 53% and males were 47% of same-sex couples.

=== Projections ===
U.S. Census Population projections (2023)
	2023	2060
White Americans^{1}	75.5%	72.3%
> Non-Hispanic Whites	58.9%	44.9%
Black Americans^{1}	13.6%	14.8%
Asian Americans^{1}	6.3%	9.4%
Multiracial Americans^{1}	3.0%	6.1%
Native Americans^{1}	1.3%	1.4%
Pacific Islanders^{1}	0.3%	0.4%
Hispanics/Latinos (of any race)	19.1%	26.9%
^{1} Including Hispanics

A report by the U.S. Census Bureau projects a decrease in the ratio of non-Hispanic Whites between 2023 and 2060, a decline from 58.9% of the population to 44.9%. Non-Hispanic Whites are projected to no longer make up a majority of the population by 2050, but will remain the largest single ethnic group. Non-Hispanic whites made up 85% of the population in 1960.

While non-Hispanic whites are projected to become a minority, the total White population (including Hispanics), will remain a majority from 2023 to 2060, falling from 75.5% to 72.3% of the population who are white alone according to the projections. However, these projections are not directly comparable to other Census Bureau data, as they are based on a modified race dataset, which does not include the "some other race" category used in census surveys. Individuals identifying as "some other race" alone or in combination made up 16.2% of the population in 2022, and they are reclassified into recognized race categories in the dataset used for the projections. As a result, there is a significant discrepancy between the share of the white alone population in 2023 according to the projections (75.5%), and the estimated share of white alone (60.9%), as reported by the American Community Survey in 2022.

The report foresees the Hispanic or Latino population rising from 19.1% today to 26.9% by 2060, the Black percentage barely rising from 13.6% to 14.8%, and Asian Americans upping their 6.3% share to 9.4%. The United States had a population of 333 million people in July 2023, and is projected to reach 355 million by 2040 and 364 million in 2060. It is further projected that all of the increase in population from 2023 to 2060 will be due to immigrants.

Of the nation's children in 2060, 64% are expected to be of a minority ethnicity, up from 51% today. Approximately 32% are projected to be Hispanic or Latino (up from 26% in 2023), and 36% are projected to be single-race, non-Hispanic Whites (down from 49% in 2023). Racial and ethnic minorities surpassed non-Hispanic whites as the largest group of U.S. children under 5 years old in 2015.

The fastest growing racial group in America is Asian Americans with a growth rate of 35%, however the multiracial mixed Asian group is growing even faster, with a growth rate of 55%. Multiracial Asians are therefore the fastest growing demographic group in America.

In 2020, it was reported that 51.0% of births were to non-Hispanic white mothers. In 2021, the percentage increased to 51.5%. However, by 2022 the rate of births to white mothers had declined by 3%, dropping to 50% of all total births. In the same period, the rate of births to Asian and Hispanic women increased by 2% and 6%, respectively. In the same time period, births to Asian American and Hispanic women increased by 2% and 6%, respectively.

Population pyramids of racial groups (of one race)

White Americans

African Americans

Multiracial Americans

Asian Americans

Native Americans
Population pyramids of ethnic groups

Non-Hispanic White Americans

Non-Hispanic African Americans

Hispanic Americans

Pew Research Center projections

The United Nations projects a population of just over 400 million in 2060.

Pew Research Center projections (2008)
	1960	2005	2050
White Americans	85%	67%	47%
Hispanic Americans	3.5%	14%	29%
Black Americans	11%	13%	14%
Asian Americans	0.6%	5%	9%
Note: All races modified and not Hispanic; American Indian/Alaska Native not shown.

The country's racial profile will be vastly different, and although whites will remain the single largest ethnic group in the U.S., they will no longer be a majority excluding White Hispanics by 2055 according to Pew Research Center. Growth in the Hispanic and Asian populations is predicted to almost triple over the next 40 years. By 2055, the breakdown is estimated to be 48% non-Hispanic white, 24% Hispanic, 16% Black, and 14% Asian.

As of 2015, 14% of the United States' population is foreign born, compared to just 5% in 1965. Nearly 39 million immigrants have come to the U.S. since 1965, with most coming from Asia and Latin America. The 2015 Census Report predicts that the percentage of the U.S. population that is foreign-born will continue to increase, reaching 19% by 2060. This increase in the foreign-born population will account for a large share of the overall population growth.

The average person in the U.S. of 2060 is likely to be older than the average person of 2018 today, and it is projected that almost one in four people will be 65 or older.

==== U.S. Census Census Bureau projections ====
Percent minority 1970–2042 (2008 projections)

Years	1970	1980	1990	2000	2010	2020	2030	2040	2042
Percent minority (%)	16.5	20.4	24.4	30.9	36.3	39.9	44.5	49.2	50.1

Note: "Minority" refers to people who reported their ethnicity and race as something other than non-Hispanic White alone in the decennial census.

Total US population

Year	Projection (Census Bureau) (thousands)	Projection (UN) (thousands)	Actual result
2010	310,233	309,011	308,745,538
2020	332,639	331,003	331,449,281
2030	373,504	349,642	
2040	405,655	366,572	
2050	439,010	379,419	

=== Self-reported ancestry ===
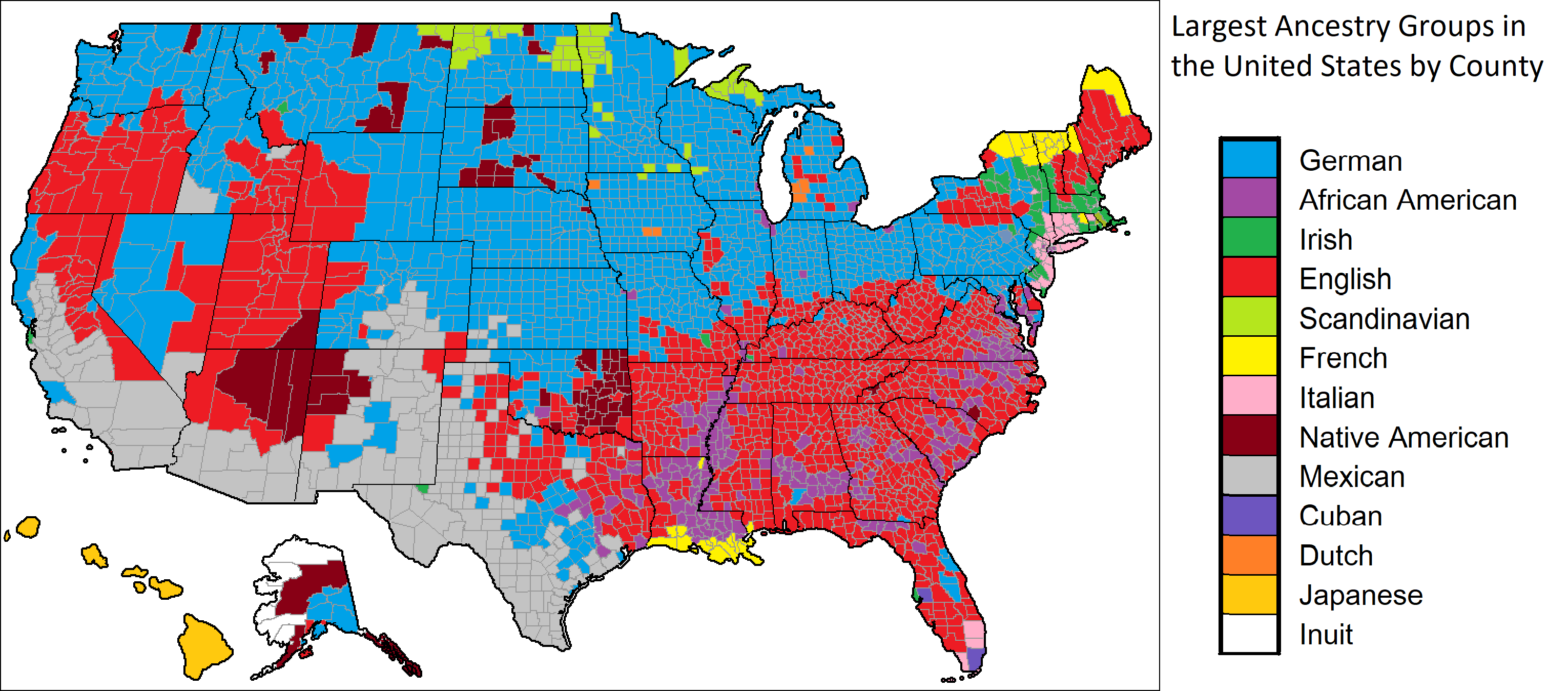
Most common ancestry group in the United States by county

This table displays all self-reported ancestries with over 10,000 members according to estimates from the 2026 American Community Survey.

Ancestry (2026)	Quantity	% Total
Total	344,977,560	100.00%
German	41,137,168	11.92%
African-American	37,698,576	10.93%
Mexican	37,414,772	10.85%
English	31,380,620	9.10%
Irish	30,655,612	8.89%
American	17,786,214	5.16%
Italian	16,009,774	4.64%
Polish	8,249,491	2.39%
French	6,310,548	1.83%
Puerto Rican	5,905,178	1.71%
Chinese	5,465,428	1.58%
Scottish	5,352,344	1.55%
Indian	4,946,306	1.43%
Unspecified European	4,819,541	1.40%
Filipino	4,466,918	1.29%
Swedish	3,936,772	1.14%
Norwegian	3,317,462	0.96%
Dutch	3,019,465	0.88%
Unspecified Native American	2,550,528	0.74%
Scotch-Irish	2,524,746	0.73%
Salvadoran	2,480,509	0.72%
Cuban	2,435,573	0.71%
Dominican	2,396,784	0.69%
Vietnamese	2,301,868	0.67%
Unspecified Hispanic	2,276,867	0.66%
Russian	2,099,079	0.61%
Korean	2,051,572	0.59%
Spanish	1,926,228	0.56%
Guatemalan	1,878,599	0.54%
Unspecified African	1,721,108	0.50%
French Canadian	1,626,456	0.47%
Japanese	1,587,040	0.46%
Welsh	1,521,565	0.44%
Colombian	1,451,271	0.42%
Cherokee	1,449,888	0.42%
Portuguese	1,350,442	0.39%
Hungarian	1,247,165	0.36%
Jamaican	1,234,336	0.36%
Honduran	1,219,212	0.35%
Greek	1,200,706	0.35%
British	1,196,265	0.35%
Czech	1,188,711	0.34%
Ukrainian	1,164,728	0.34%
Haitian	1,138,855	0.33%
Danish	1,127,518	0.33%
Unspecified Eastern European	951,384	0.28%
Unspecified Scandinavian	935,153	0.27%
Native Mexican	875,183	0.25%
Ecuadorian	870,965	0.25%
Swiss	847,247	0.25%
Venezuelan	814,080	0.24%
Peruvian	751,519	0.22%
Native Hawaiian	714,847	0.21%
Nigerian	712,294	0.21%
Native Central American	634,503	0.18%
Pakistani	625,570	0.18%
Finnish	606,028	0.18%
Slovak	602,949	0.17%
Lithuanian	598,508	0.17%
Unspecified Asian	591,806	0.17%
Austrian	584,517	0.17%
Lebanese	583,719	0.17%
Other Arab	552,465	0.16%
Brazilian	546,757	0.16%
Anglo Canadian	542,459	0.16%
Iranian	519,658	0.15%
Nicaraguan	488,080	0.14%
Armenian	458,841	0.13%
Romanian	450,751	0.13%
Navajo	434,910	0.13%
Unspecified Northern European	434,292	0.13%
Croatian	389,272	0.11%
Ethiopian	387,880	0.11%
Cambodian	376,096	0.11%
Other sub-Saharan African	366,701	0.11%
Hmong	362,244	0.11%
Egyptian	334,574	0.10%
Thai	328,176	0.10%
Taiwanese	324,389	0.09%
Belgian	316,493	0.09%
Argentine	304,541	0.09%
Choctaw	295,373	0.09%
Bangladeshi	272,338	0.08%
Other Central Asian	269,255	0.08%
Samoan	264,392	0.08%
Nepali	260,323	0.08%
Other Pacific Islander	251,806	0.07%
Guyanese	250,467	0.07%
Generic West Indian	245,867	0.07%
Laotian	245,220	0.07%
Burmese	244,086	0.07%
Trinidadian	243,541	0.07%
Panamanian	242,035	0.07%
Turkish	239,667	0.07%
Pennsylvania German	228,634	0.07%
Czechoslovaks	227,217	0.07%
Albanian	223,984	0.06%
Sioux	220,739	0.06%
Ghanaian	217,322	0.06%
Chippewa/Ojibwe	206,224	0.06%
Alaska Native	205,954	0.06%
Syrian	203,282	0.06%
Chilean	199,948	0.06%
Yugoslavian	198,687	0.06%
Apache	191,823	0.06%
Serbian	191,538	0.06%
Afghan	189,493	0.05%
Costa Rican	186,159	0.05%
Palestinians	171,969	0.05%
Iraqi	164,851	0.05%
Somali	164,723	0.05%
Indonesian	155,173	0.04%
Slovene	153,589	0.04%
Israeli	144,202	0.04%
Bolivian	142,108	0.04%
Unspecified Slavic	140,956	0.04%
Moroccan	140,196	0.04%
Chamorro	126,118	0.04%
Kenyan	122,131	0.04%
Creek/Muscogee	119,850	0.03%
Unspecified British West Indian	109,344	0.03%
Iroqouis	107,839	0.03%
Bulgarian	106,896	0.03%
Cape Verdean	104,710	0.03%
South African	98,309	0.03%
Assyrian	93,542	0.03%
Liberian	92,651	0.03%
Latvian	91,859	0.03%
Cajun	91,706	0.03%
Native South American	91,508	0.03%
Australian	88,999	0.03%
Jordanian	86,926	0.03%
Lumbee	81,645	0.02%
Pueblo	81,419	0.02%
Other Micronesian	79,879	0.02%
Tongan	79,826	0.02%
Uruguayan	77,180	0.02%
Sri Lankan	75,808	0.02%
Chickasaw	72,601	0.02%
Sudanese	71,788	0.02%
Yaqui	71,063	0.02%
Belizean	67,329	0.02%
Macedonian	65,107	0.02%
Basque	62,731	0.02%
Barbadian	62,356	0.02%
Bahamian	56,928	0.02%
Icelandic	53,415	0.02%
Fijian	53,250	0.02%
Uzbek	52,304	0.02%
Mongolian	51,954	0.02%
Marshallese	51,119	0.01%
Ugandan	35,849	0.01%
Senegalese	31,462	0.01%
Guamanian	25,888	0.01%
Kazakh	21,913	0.01%
Zimbabwean	17,991	0.01%
Chuukese	12,567	0.00%

== Religion ==
=== Religious affiliations ===
Religion in the United States (2023)
1. Protestantism (39.0%)
2. Catholicism (19.0%)
3. Mormon (2.00%)
4. Other Christian (2.00%)
5. Jewish (2.00%)
6. Muslim (1.00%)
7. Buddhist (1.00%)
8. Hindu (1.00%)
9. Other religion (3.00%)
10. Unaffiliated (29.0%)
11. Refused (1.00%)

The table below is based mainly on selected data as reported to the United States Census Bureau. It only includes the voluntary self-reported membership of religious bodies with 750,000 or more. The definition of a member is determined by each religious body. In 2004, the US census bureau reported that about 13% of the population did not identify themselves as a member of any religion.

According to data from Pew Research, Americans are significantly more religious on average than populations in other developed Western nations, with 55% of Americans reporting praying daily, compared to only 25% of Canadians, 18% of Australians, 6% of British people, and 22% of Europeans as a whole. The country has a smaller share of unaffiliated or atheist population than most other Western nations. However, this population has been growing significantly in recent decades. Surveys conducted in 2014 and 2019 by Pew indicated that the percentage of Americans unaffiliated with a religion increased from 16% in 2007 to 23% in 2014 and 26% of the population in 2019. A Pew Research Survey performed in 2012 found that the number of Americans without a religion was approaching the number of Evangelical Protestants, and estimated that if the current growth rate in irreligion continued, around 51% of Americans will not have a religion by 2050.

According to statistical data made by the Pew Research Center in 2023 about 62% of the US population is Christian, 29% is Unaffiliated, 2% is Jewish, 1% follows Buddhism, 1% follows Hinduism, 1% follows Islam and 3% follow traditional religions and others. Currently, the United States has the largest Christian population in the world (approximately 210 million) and the largest Protestant Christian population (approximately 130 million). The country also has the second largest Jewish community in the world (after Israel) and the largest Buddhist and Hindu communities in the West, as well as the largest number of followers of Islam in North America. The country has about 99 million non-affiliates (only China and Japan have more).

Chart:

Religious body	Year reported	Places of worship	Membership (thousands)	Clergy
African Methodist Episcopal Church	1999	no data	2,500	7,741
African Methodist Episcopal Zion Church	2002	3,226	1,431	3,252
American Baptist Association	2009	1,600	100	1,740
Amish, Old Order	1993	898	227	3,592
American Baptist Churches USA	2017	5,057	1,146	4,145
Antiochian Orthodox Christian Archdiocese of North America	1998	220	65	263
Armenian Apostolic Church	2010	153	1,000	200
Armenian Catholic Church	2010		36	
Assemblies of God	2018	13,017	1,857	38,199
Baptist Bible Fellowship International	2010	4,000	1,100	4,190
Baptist General Conference	1998	876	141	no data
Baptist Missionary Association of America	2010	1,272	138	1,525
Buddhism	2001	no data	1,082	no data
Christian and Missionary Alliance, The	1998	1,964	346	1,629
Christian Brethren (Plymouth Brethren)	1997	1,150	100	no data
Christian Church (Disciples of Christ)	2018	3,624	382	2,066
Christian churches and churches of Christ	1998	5,579	1,072	5,525
Christian Congregation, Inc., The	1998	1,438	117	1,436
Christian Methodist Episcopal Church	1983	2,340	719	no data
Christian Reformed Church in North America	1998	733	199	655
Church of God in Christ	1991	15,300	5,500	28,988
Church of God of Prophecy	1997	1,908	77	2,000
Church of God (Anderson, IN)	1998	2,353	234	3,034
Church of God (Cleveland, Tennessee)	1995	6,060	753	3,121
The Church of Jesus Christ of Latter-day Saints	2014	14,018	6,466	38,259
Church of the Brethren	2019	978	99	827
Church of the Nazarene	1998	5,101	627	4,598
Churches of Christ	2019	11,989	1,116	14,500
Conservative Baptist Association of America	1998	1,200	200	no data
Community of Christ	1998	1,236	140	19,319
Coptic Orthodox Church	2003	200	1,000	200
Covenant Order of Evangelical Presbyterians	2012	383	130	500
Cumberland Presbyterian Church	1998	774	87	630
Episcopal Church	2018	6,423	1,676	8,131
Evangelical Covenant Church, The	1998	628	97	607
Evangelical Free Church of America, The	1995	1,224	243	1,936
Evangelical Lutheran Church in America	2018	9,091	3,363	9,646
Evangelical Presbyterian Church	1998	187	145	262
Free Methodist Church of North America	1998	990	73	no data
Full Gospel Fellowship	1999	896	275	2,070
General Association of General Baptists	1997	790	72	1,085
General Association of Regular Baptist Churches	1998	1,415	102	no data
U.S. Conference of Mennonite Brethren Churches	1996	368	82	590
Grace Gospel Fellowship	1992	128	60	160
Greek Orthodox Archdiocese of America	2006	560	1,500	840
Hinduism	2001	no data	766	no data
Independent Fundamental Churches of America	1999	659	62	no data
International Church of the Foursquare Gospel	1998	1,851	238	4,900
International Council of Community Churches	1998	150	250	182
International Pentecostal Holiness Church	1998	1,716	177	1507
Islam	2011	no data	2,600	no data
Jainism	no data	no data	50	no data
Jehovah's Witnesses	2014	13,871	1,243	no data
Judaism	2006	3,727	6,588	no data
Lutheran Church–Missouri Synod, The	2017	6,046	1,969	6,055
Macedonian Orthodox Church – Ohrid Archbishopric	2010	19	50	no data
Mennonite Church USA	2005	943	114	no data
National Association of Congregational Christian Churches	1998	416	67	534
National Association of Free Will Baptists	2007	2,369	186	3,915
National Baptist Convention of America, Inc.	1987	2,500	3,500	8,000
National Baptist Convention, USA, Inc.	1992	33,000	8,200	32,832
National Missionary Baptist Convention of America	2004	300	400	no data
Orthodox Church in America	2010	750	131	970
Pentecostal Assemblies of the World, Inc.	1998	1,750	1,500	4,500
Pentecostal Church of God	1998	1,237	104	no data
Pentecostal Church International, United	2008	28,351	4,037	22,881
Presbyterian Church in America	1997	1,340	385	1,642
Presbyterian Church (U.S.A.)	2018	9,161	1,245	19,243
Progressive National Baptist Convention, Inc.	2017	1,200	1,500	no data
Reformed Church in America	2018	902	200	915
Religious Society of Friends	1994	1,200	104	no data
Roman Catholic Church	2002	19,484	66,404	50,017 (1997)
Romanian Orthodox Episcopate	1996	37	65	37
Salvation Army, The	1998	1,388	471	2,920
Scientology	2005	1,300	55	1
Serbian Orthodox Church	1986	68	67	60
Seventh-day Adventist Church	1998	4,405	840	2,454
Sikhism	1999	244	80	no data
Southern Baptist Convention	2019	47,530	14,525	71,520
Unitarian Universalism	2001	no data	629	no data
United Church of Christ	2016	5,000	880	5,868
United House of Prayer for All People	no data	100	25	no data
United Methodist Church, The	2018	36,170	6,672	no data
Wesleyan Church, The	1998	1,590	120	1,806
Wisconsin Evangelical Lutheran Synod	2018	1,281	359	1,222
Zoroastrianism	2006	no data	11	no data

Religious affiliation within each state that has the largest deviation compared to the national average, 2001

Percentage of state populations that identify with a religion rather than "no religion", 2014

Plurality religion by state, 2001. Data is unavailable for Alaska and Hawaii.

According to Pew Research Center study released in 2018, by 2040, Islam will surpass Judaism to become the second largest religion in the US due to higher immigration and birth rates.

=== Religions of U.S. adults ===
The United States government does not collect religious data in its census. The survey below, the American Religious Identification Survey (ARIS) 2008, was a random digit-dialed telephone survey of 54,461 American residential households in the contiguous United States. The 1990 sample size was 113,723; 2001 sample size was 50,281.

Adult respondents were asked the open-ended question, "What is your religion, if any?". Interviewers did not prompt or offer a suggested list of potential answers. The religion of the spouse or partner was also asked. If the initial answer was "Protestant" or "Christian" further questions were asked to probe which particular denomination. About one-third of the sample was asked more detailed demographic questions.

Religious Self-Identification of the U.S. Adult Population: 1990, 2001, 2008
Figures are not adjusted for refusals to reply; investigators suspect refusals are possibly more representative of "no religion" than any other group.

Source:ARIS 2008
Group	1990 adults × 1,000	2001 adults × 1,000	2008 adults × 1,000	Numerical Change 1990– 2008 as % of 1990	1990 % of adults	2001 % of adults	2008 % of adults	change in % of total adults 1990– 2008
Adult population, total	175,440	207,983	228,182	30.1%				
Adult population, Responded	171,409	196,683	216,367	26.2%	97.7%	94.6%	94.8%	−2.9%
Total Christian	151,225	159,514	173,402	14.7%	86.2%	76.7%	76.0%	−10.2%
Catholic	46,004	50,873	57,199	24.3%	26.2%	24.5%	25.1%	−1.2%
Non-Catholic Christian	105,221	108,641	116,203	10.4%	60.0%	52.2%	50.9%	−9.0%
Baptist	33,964	33,820	36,148	6.4%	19.4%	16.3%	15.8%	−3.5%
Mainline Protestant	32,784	35,788	29,375	−10.4%	18.7%	17.2%	12.9%	−5.8%
Methodist	14,174	14,039	11,366	−19.8%	8.1%	6.8%	5.0%	−3.1%
Lutheran	9,110	9,580	8,674	−4.8%	5.2%	4.6%	3.8%	−1.4%
Presbyterian	4,985	5,596	4,723	−5.3%	2.8%	2.7%	2.1%	−0.8%
Episcopalian/Anglican	3,043	3,451	2,405	−21.0%	1.7%	1.7%	1.1%	−0.7%
United Church of Christ	438	1,378	736	68.0%	0.2%	0.7%	0.3%	0.1%
Christian Generic	25,980	22,546	32,441	24.9%	14.8%	10.8%	14.2%	−0.6%
Jehovah's Witness	1,381	1,331	1,914	38.6%	0.8%	0.6%	0.8%	0.1%
Christian Unspecified	8,073	14,190	16,384	102.9%	4.6%	6.8%	7.2%	2.6%
Non-denominational Christian	194	2,489	8,032	4040.2%	0.1%	1.2%	3.5%	3.4%
Protestant – Unspecified	17,214	4,647	5,187	−69.9%	9.8%	2.2%	2.3%	−7.5%
Evangelical/Born Again	546	1,088	2,154	294.5%	0.3%	0.5%	0.9%	0.6%
Pentecostal/Charismatic	5,647	7,831	7,948	40.7%	3.2%	3.8%	3.5%	0.3%
Pentecostal – Unspecified	3,116	4,407	5,416	73.8%	1.8%	2.1%	2.4%	0.6%
Assemblies of God	617	1,105	810	31.3%	0.4%	0.5%	0.4%	0.0%
Church of God	590	943	663	12.4%	0.3%	0.5%	0.3%	0.0%
Other Protestant Denomination	4,630	5,949	7,131	54.0%	2.6%	2.9%	3.1%	0.5%
Seventh-day Adventist	668	724	938	40.4%	0.4%	0.3%	0.4%	0.0%
Churches of Christ	1,769	2,593	1,921	8.6%	1.0%	1.2%	0.8%	−0.2%
Mormon/Latter-Day Saints	2,487	2,697	3,158	27.0%	1.4%	1.3%	1.4%	0.0%
Total non-Christian religions	5,853	7,740	8,796	50.3%	3.3%	3.7%	3.9%	0.5%
Jewish	3,137	2,837	2,680	−14.6%	1.8%	1.4%	1.2%	−0.6%
Eastern Religions	687	2,020	1,961	185.4%	0.4%	1.0%	0.9%	0.5%
Buddhist	404	1,082	1,189	194.3%	0.2%	0.5%	0.5%	0.3%
Muslim	527	1,104	1,349	156.0%	0.3%	0.5%	0.6%	0.3%
New Religious Movements & Others	1,296	1,770	2,804	116.4%	0.7%	0.9%	1.2%	0.5%
None/ No religion, total	14,331	29,481	34,169	138.4%	8.2%	14.2%	15.0%	6.8%
Agnostic+Atheist	1,186	1,893	3,606	204.0%	0.7%	0.9%	1.6%	0.9%
Did Not Know/ Refused to reply	4,031	11,300	11,815	193.1%	2.3%	5.4%	5.2%	2.9%

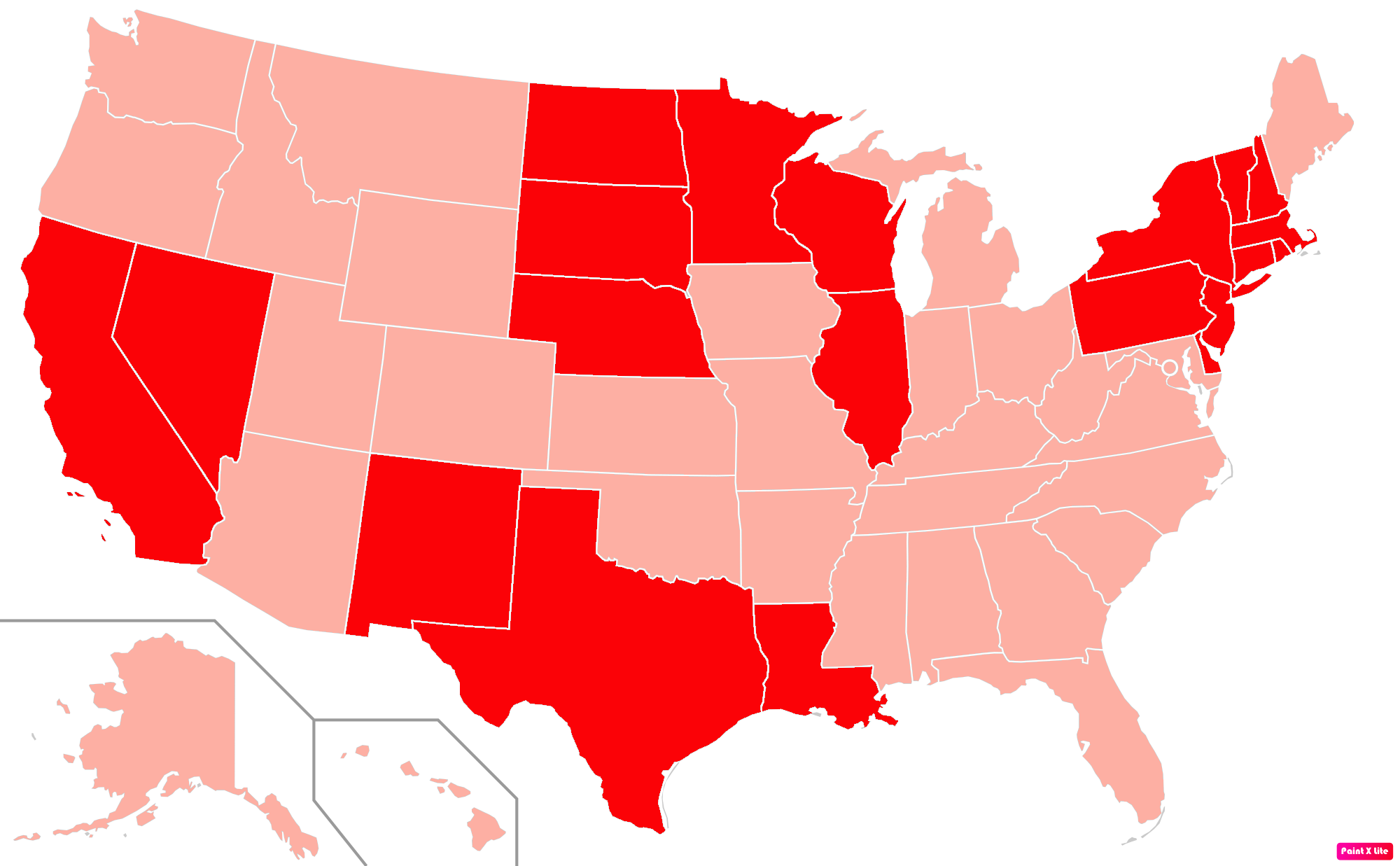
States in the United States by Catholic population according to the Pew Research Center 2014 Religious Landscape Survey. States with Catholic population greater than the United States as a whole are in full red.

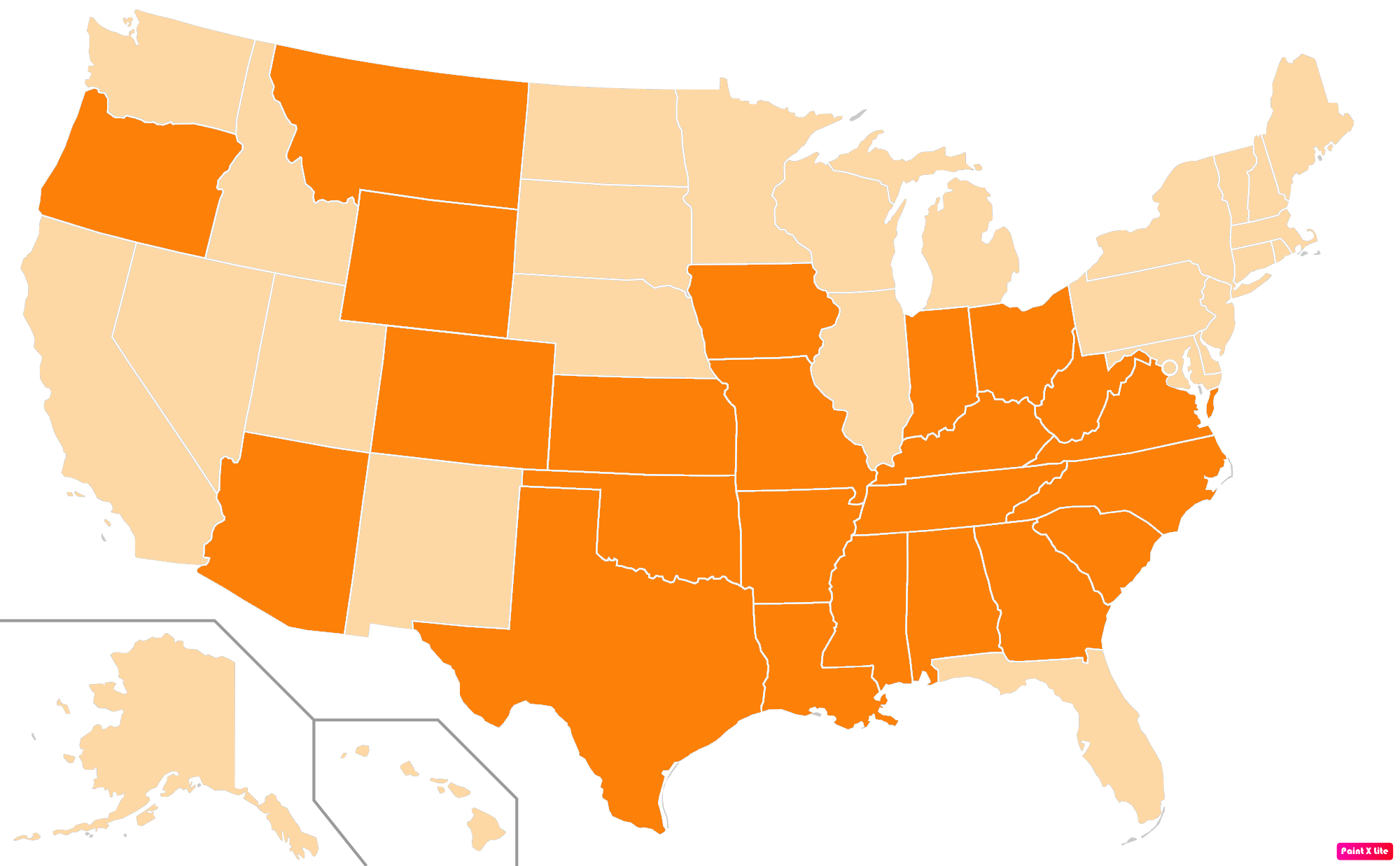
States in the United States by Evangelical Protestant population according to the Pew Research Center 2014 Religious Landscape Survey. States with Evangelical Protestant populations greater than the United States as a whole are in full orange.
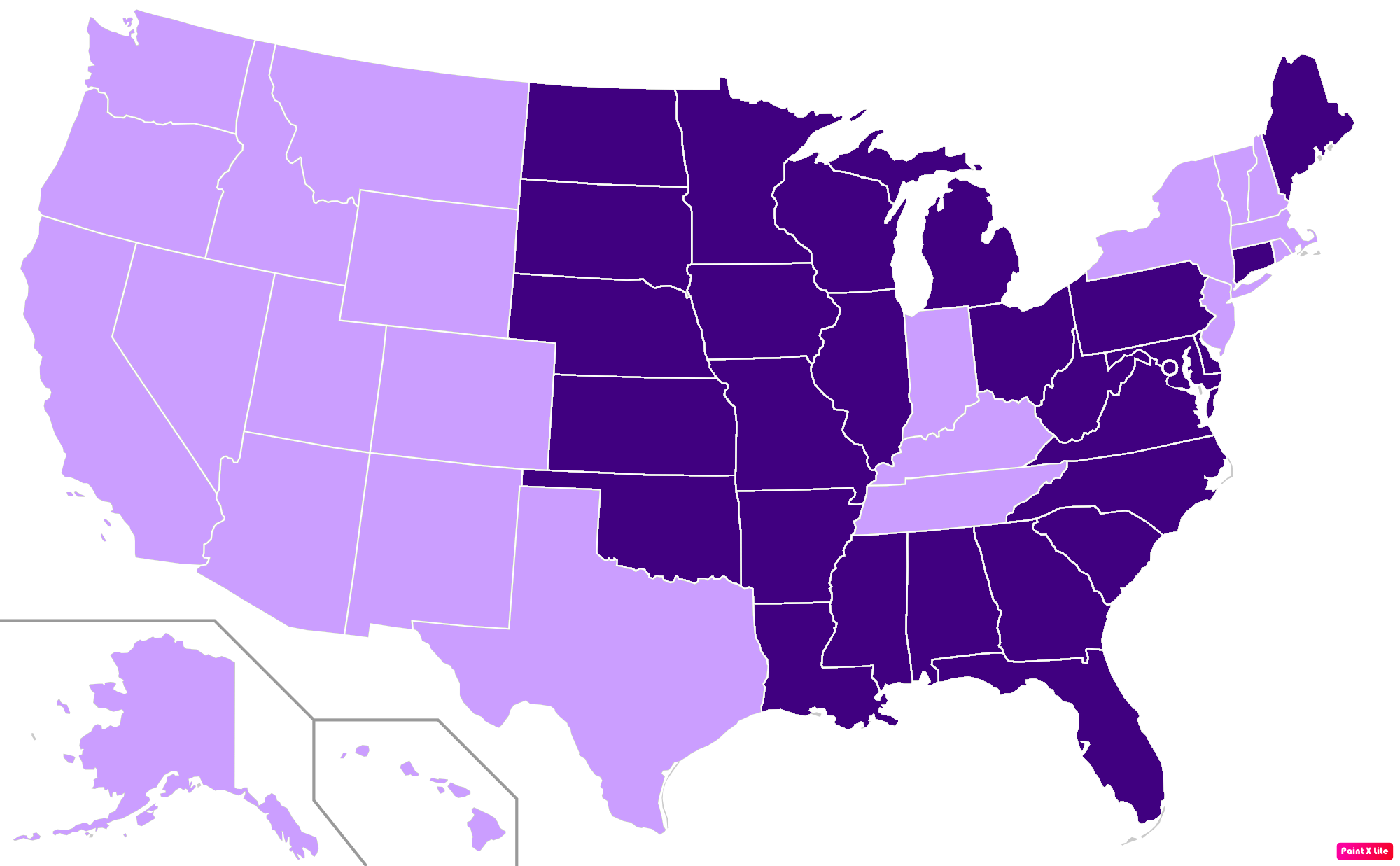
States in the United States by Mainline or Black Protestant population according to the Pew Research Center 2014 Religious Landscape Survey. States with Mainline or Black Protestant population greater than the United States as a whole are in full purple.

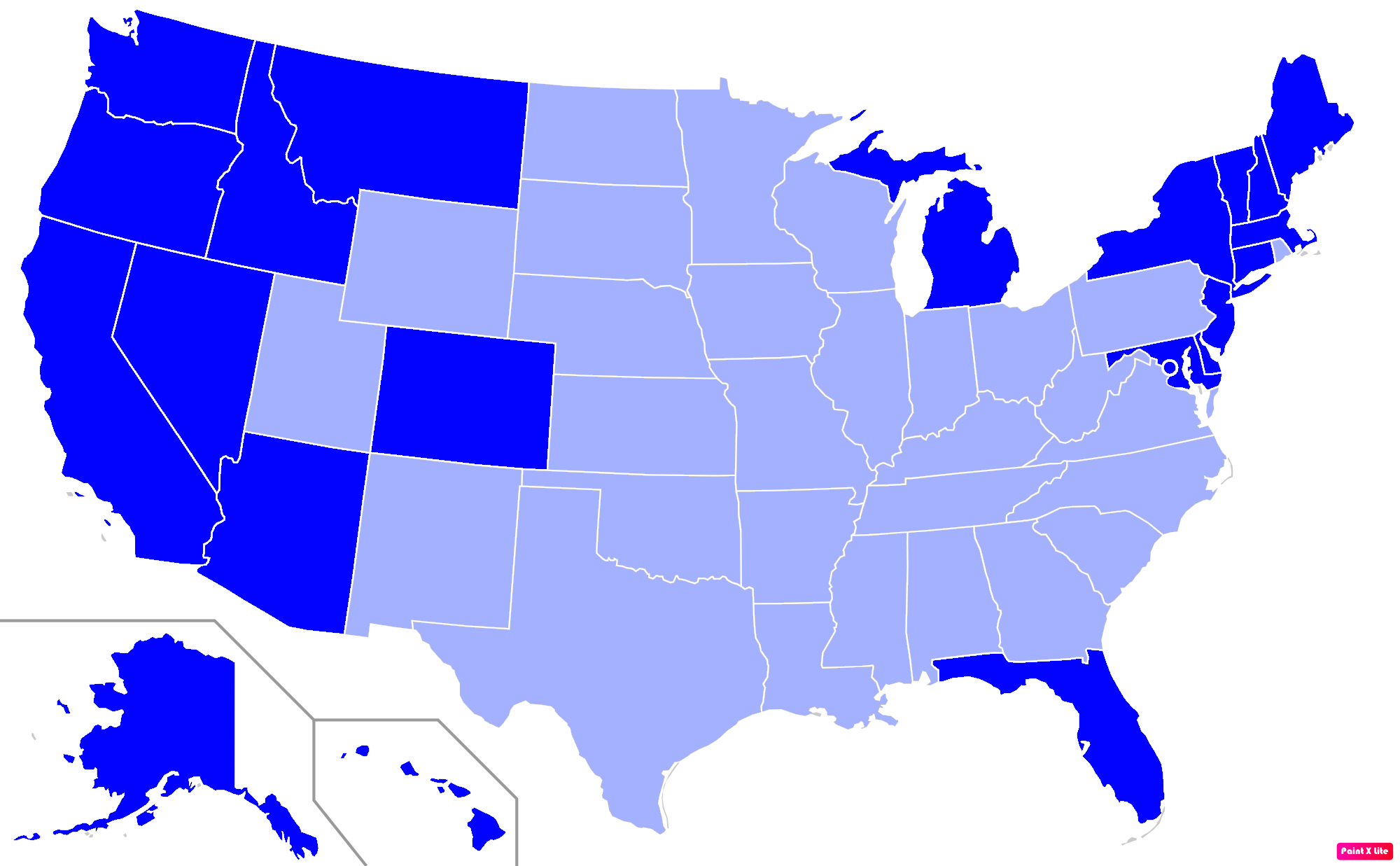
States in the United States by non-Christian (e.g. Non-religious, Jewish, Muslim, Hindu, Buddhist) population according to the Pew Research Center 2014 Religious Landscape Survey. States with non-Christian populations greater than the United States as a whole are in full blue.
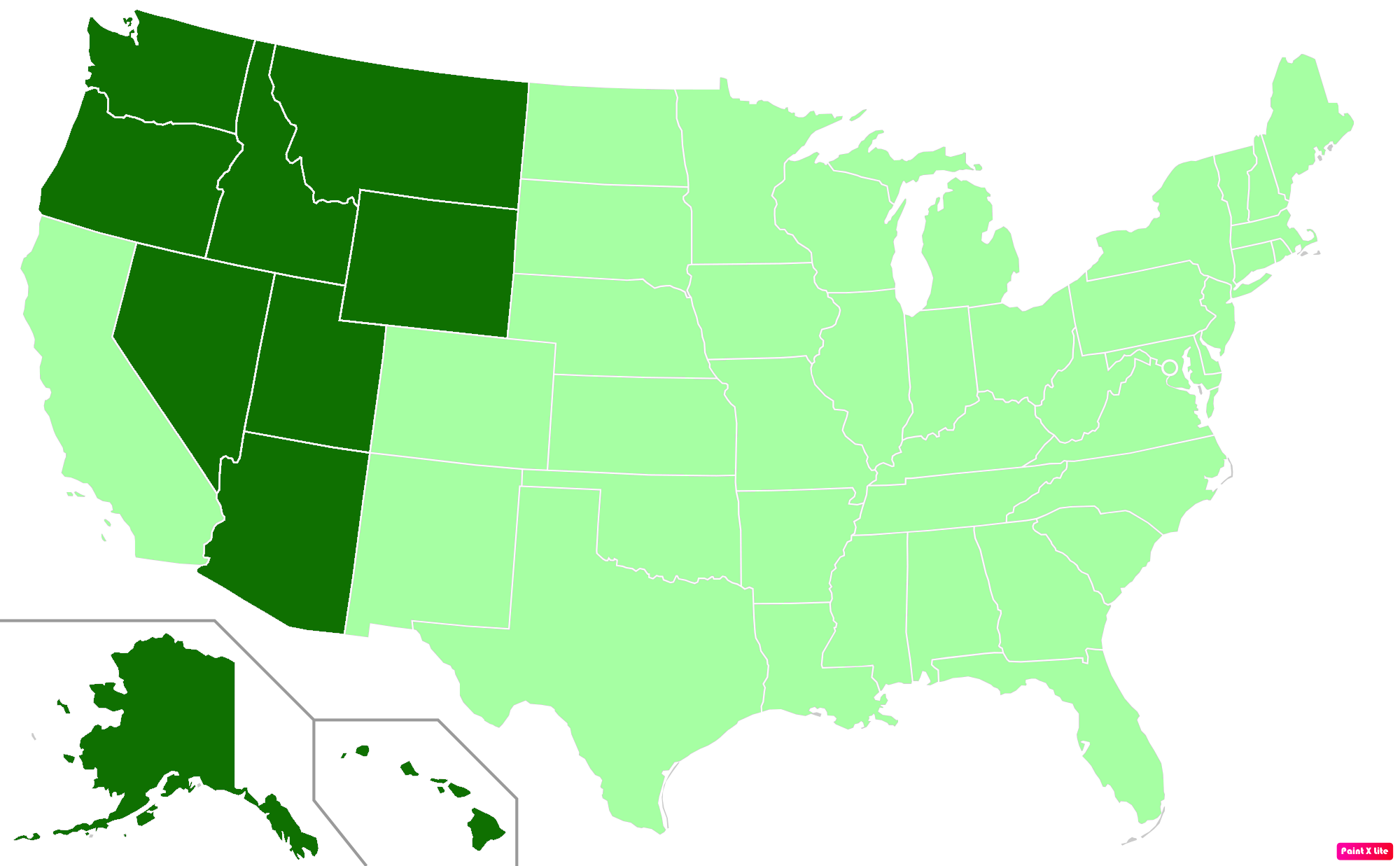
States in the United States by non-Protestant and non-Catholic Christian (e.g. Mormon, Jehovah's Witness, Eastern Orthodox) population according to the Pew Research Center 2014 Religious Landscape Survey. States with non-Catholic/non-Protestant Christian population greater than the United States as a whole are in full green.

== Migration ==
=== Immigration ===
==== Foreign-born population ====
In recent decades, the U.S. has grown from having 9% (1990) to 15% (2020) of the population being born abroad. The slopes of the tops of the differently-colored columns show the rate of percent increase in foreign-born people living in the respective countries.

Foreign born population percentage in the US over time from 1850 to 2020

As of 2017, an estimated 44,525,458 residents of the United States were foreign-born, 13.5% of the country's total population. This demographic includes recent as well as longstanding immigrants; statistically Europeans have resided in the US longer than those from other regions with approximately 66% having arrived prior to 2000.

Place of birth of the foreign-born population in the United States, 2017
Place of birth	Estimate	Percentage of total foreign-born people
Americas	23,241,959	52.2%
Caribbean	4,414,943	9.9%
> Cuba	1,311,803	3.0%
> Dominican Republic	1,162,568	2.6%
Central America (including Mexico)	14,796,926	33.2%
> Mexico	11,269,913	25.3%
> El Salvador	1,401,832	3.2%
South America	3,213,187	7.2%
Canada	809,267	1.8%
Europe	4,818,662	10.8%
Northern Europe	941,796	2.1%
Western Europe	949,591	2.1%
Southern Europe	761,390	1.7%
Eastern Europe	2,153,855	4.8%
Asia	13,907,844	31.2%
Eastern Asia	4,267,303	9.6%
> China	2,639,365	5.9%
> Korea	1,064,960	2.4%
South Central Asia	4,113,013	9.2%
> India	2,348,687	5.3%
South Eastern Asia	4,318,647	9.8%
> Philippines	1,945,345	4.4%
> Vietnam	1,314,927	3.0%
Western Asia	1,159,835	2.6%
Africa	2,293,028	5.2%
Eastern Africa	693,784	1.6%
Middle Africa	163,364	0.4%
Northern Africa	359,559	0.8%
Southern Africa	116,297	0.2%
Western Africa	837,290	1.9%
Oceania	263,965	0.6%
Australia and New Zealand Subregion	123,080	0.3%

==== Immigration (2023) ====
Immigrants in the United States
Country	Immigrants
Mexico	10,918,205
India	2,910,042
China	2,193,250
Philippines	2,051,900
El Salvador	1,494,869
Cuba	1,450,808
Vietnam	1,365,841
Dominican Republic	1,265,231
Guatemala	1,250,053
Colombia	1,049,821

In 2017, out of the U.S. foreign-born population, some 45% (20.7 million) were naturalized citizens, 27% (12.3 million) were lawful permanent residents (including many eligible to become citizens), 6% (2.2 million) were temporary lawful residents, and 23% (10.5 million) were unauthorized immigrants. The Pew Research Center estimated that "the number of unauthorized immigrants in the United States reached an all-time high of 14 million in 2023 after two consecutive years of growth".

Among current living immigrants to the U.S., the top five countries of birth are Mexico (25% of immigrants), China (6%), India (6%), the Philippines (5%) and El Salvador (3%). Some 13% of current living immigrants come from Europe and Canada, and 10% from the Caribbean. Among new arrivals, Asian immigrants have been more numerous than Hispanic immigrants since 2010; in 2017, 37.4% of immigrant arrivals were Asian, and 26.6% were Hispanic. Until 2017 and 2018, the United States led the world in refugee resettlement for decades, admitting more refugees than the rest of the world combined. From fiscal year 1980 until 2017, 55% of refugees came from Asia, 27% from Europe, 13% from Africa, and 4% from Latin America, fleeing war and persecution.

- Net migration rate (2024): 3 migrants/1,000 population. Country comparison to the world: 38th
- Net migration rate* (2020–2021): 0.73 migrants/1,000 population.

*(mid-year estimates)

As of 2017, 13.6% (44.4 million) of the population was foreign-born – an increase from 4.7% in 1970 but less than the 1890 record of 14.8%. Some 45% of the foreign-born population were naturalized US citizens. Around 23% (10.3 million) of the foreign-born community is undocumented, accounting for 3.2% of the total population. According to the 2010 census, Latin America and the Caribbean is the largest region-of-birth group, accounting for 53% of the foreign-born population. As of 2018, this region is still the largest source of immigrants to the United States. In 2018, there were almost 90 million immigrants and U.S. born children of immigrants (second-generation Americans) in the United States, accounting for 28% of the overall U.S. population. In 2018, 1,096,611 immigrants were granted either permanent or temporary legal residence in the United States

Inflow of New Legal Permanent Residents Sending Countries, 2023
Country	2023
Mexico	180,530
Cuba	81,600
India	78,070
Dominican Republic	68,870
China	59,260
Philippines	49,200
Vietnam	36,000
Afghanistan	30,300
Brazil	28,880
El Salvador	26,210
Colombia	24,810
Jamaica	21,460
Bangladesh	18,910
Venezuela	18,440
Nigeria	15,790
South Korea	15,770
Guatemala	15,690
Haiti	15,450
Honduras	14,140
Peru	12,580
Nepal	11,930
Canada	11,870
Russia	11,570
Iran	11,450
Ecuador	11,300
Ukraine	11,250
Pakistan	11,110
Egypt	10,190
United Kingdom	9,720
Turkey	7,330
Jordan	7,140
Ghana	6,910
Ethiopia	6,510
Morocco	6,170
Cameroon	6,010
Guyana	5,860
Yemen	5,580
Uzbekistan	5,550
Taiwan	5,300
Thailand	5,230
Albania	5,160
Algeria	5,150
Kenya	5,080
Argentina	5,050
Democratic Republic of the Congo	4,880
Armenia	4,720
Germany	4,550
France	4,480
Japan	4,060
Myanmar	3,970
Iraq	3,960
Nicaragua	3,870
South Africa	3,850
Syria	3,680
Israel	3,650
Lebanon	3,650
Italy	3,470
Spain	3,350
Sudan	3,340
Poland	3,170
Saudi Arabia	3,040
Kazakhstan	2,900
Australia	2,790
Georgia	2,690
Kyrgyzstan	2,680
Belarus	2,600
Liberia	2,590
Trinidad and Tobago	2,590
Costa Rica	2,490
Cambodia	2,470
Hong Kong	2,290
Sri Lanka	2,270
Chile	2,200
Togo	2,100
Tajikistan	2,090
Indonesia	1,930
Sierra Leone	1,870
Cape Verde	1,860
Romania	1,860
Rwanda	1,850
United Arab Emirates	1,840
Tanzania	1,820
Ivory Coast	1,700
Malaysia	1,700
Uganda	1,660
Bolivia	1,580
Guinea	1,540
Moldova	1,540
Eritrea	1,520
Soviet Union (former)	1,440
Senegal	1,400
Azerbaijan	1,370
Ireland	1,340
Zimbabwe	1,310
Somalia	1,230
Netherlands	1,210
Kuwait	1,170
Gambia	1,080
Kosovo	1,040
Greece	1,020
Panama	1,010
Bulgaria	960
Fiji	960
Libya	920
North Macedonia	920
Portugal	890
Singapore	880
Bahamas	870
Uruguay	870
Burundi	840
Sweden	820
Burkina Faso	810
Hungary	810
Mongolia	810
Laos	730
Unknown	730
New Zealand	720
Turkmenistan	720
Benin	710
Belize	700
Serbia	690
Belgium	670
Qatar	660
Tunisia	660
Switzerland	620
Angola	570
Saint Lucia	560
Mali	540
Serbia and Montenegro (former)	540
Czech Republic	530
Lithuania	530
Zambia	480
Republic of the Congo	470
Bosnia and Herzegovina	460
Grenada	450
Paraguay	450
Denmark	430
Dominica	390
Mauritania	390
Austria	380
Montenegro	340
Slovakia	330
Finland	320
Norway	310
Barbados	300
Chad	270
Saint Vincent and the Grenadines	260
Antigua and Barbuda	250
Croatia	250
Tonga	250
Latvia	240
United States	220
Bhutan	210
Oman	210
Bahrain	200
Malawi	200
Niger	200
Samoa	170
Djibouti	160
Gabon	160
Saint Kitts and Nevis	150
Estonia	140
Suriname	140
Central African Republic	110
Cyprus	110
Namibia	100
Slovenia	100
South Sudan	100
Macau	90
Bermuda	80
Madagascar	80
Mozambique	70
Czechoslovakia (former)	60
Equatorial Guinea	60
Iceland	60
Luxembourg	60
Mauritius	60
Botswana	50
Cayman Islands	50
Guinea-Bissau	50
Sint Maarten	50
Turks and Caicos Islands	50
All other countries	50
Aruba	40
Curaçao	40
Maldives	40
Malta	40
Papua New Guinea	40
British Virgin Islands	40
Brunei	30
Anguilla	20
Eswatini	20
French Polynesia	20
North Korea	20
Lesotho	20
Federated States of Micronesia	20
Comoros	10
Marshall Islands	10
Monaco	10
Montserrat	10
Nauru	10
Netherlands Antilles (former)	10
Palau	10
Saint Martin	10
São Tomé and Príncipe	10
Seychelles	10

Inflow of New Legal Permanent Residents by Region, 2021
Region	2021
Americas	311,806
Asia	295,306
Africa	66,211
Europe	61,521
Oceania	4,147
Not Specified	1,011
Total	707,362

Persons Obtaining Lawful Permanent Resident Status by Type and Major Class of Admission
Class of Admission (Adjustments of Status and New Arrivals)	2021
Immediate relatives of U.S. citizens	385,396
Family-sponsored preferences	65,690
Employment-based preferences	193,338
Diversity	15,145
Refugees	35,847
Asylees	20,550
Parolees	13
Children born abroad to alien residents	75
Certain Iraqis and Afghans employed by U.S. Government and their spouses and children	8,303
Cancellation of removal	5,017
Victims of human trafficking	942
Victims of crimes and their spouses and children	9,257
Other	429

=== Emigration and Expatriation ===
As of April 2015, the U.S. State Department estimated that 8.7 million American citizens live overseas. Americans living abroad are not counted in the U.S. census unless they are federal government employees or dependents of a federal employee. A 2010 paper estimated the number of civilian Americans living abroad to be around 4 million. So-called "accidental Americans" are citizens of a country other than the United States who may also be considered U.S. citizens or be eligible for U.S. citizenship under specific laws but are not aware of having such status (or became aware of it only recently).

As of 2022, 1.6 million Americans live in Mexico, according to the State Department.

== Socioeconomics ==
=== Income ===
In 2020, the median household income in the United States was around $67,521, 2.9 percent less than the 2019 median of $69,560. Household and personal income depends on variables such as race, number of income earners, educational attainment and marital status.

Median household income by selected characteristics
Type of household			Race and Hispanic origin				Region			
All households	Family households	Nonfamily households	Asian	Non-Hispanic White	Hispanic (of any race)	Black	Northeast	Midwest	South	West
$70,784	$91,162	$41,797	$101,418	$77,999	$57,981	$48,297	$77,422	$71,129	$63,368	$79,430

Median household income by selected characteristics cont.
Age of Householder		Nativity of Householder		Metropolitan Statistical Area (MSA) Status		Educational Attainment of Householder*			
Under 65 years	65 years and older	Native-born	Foreign-born	Inside MSA	Outside MSA	No HS diploma	HS, no college	Some college	Bachelor min
$80,734	$47,620	$71,522	$66,043	$73,823	$53,750	$30,378	$50,401	$64,378	$115,456
*Householders aged 25 and older. In 2021, the median household income for this group was $72,046.

Median earnings by work status and sex (Persons, aged 15 years and older with earnings)
Total workers			Full-Time, year-round workers		
Both sexes	Male	Female	Both sexes	Male	Female
$45,470	$50,983	$39,201	$56,473	$61,180	$51,226

2020 Median earnings & household income by educational attainment
Measure	Overall	< 9th grade	Some HS	HS grad	Some college	Associate	Bachelor or more	Bachelor	Master	Professional	Doctorate
Persons, age 25+ w/ earnings*	$46,985	$25,162	$26,092	$34,540	$39,362	$42,391	$66,423	$60,705	$71,851	$102,741	$101,526
Male, age 25+ w/ earnings*	$52,298	$30,089	$31,097	$40,852	$47,706	$52,450	$80,192	$71,666	$91,141	$126,584	$121,956
Female, age 25+ w/ earnings*	$40,392	$18,588	$19,504	$27,320	$31,837	$36,298	$57,355	$51,154	$62,522	$92,780	$85,551
Persons, age 25+, employed full-time	$59,371	$33,945	$34,897	$42,417	$50,640	$52,285	$77,105	$71,283	$82,183	$130,466	$119,552
Household	$69,228	$29,609	$29,520	$47,405	$60,392	$68,769	$106,936	$100,128	$114,900	$151,560	$142,493
*Total work experience

Household income distribution
10th percentile	20th percentile	30th percentile	40th percentile	50th percentile	60th percentile	70th percentile	80th percentile	90th percentile	95th percentile
≤ $15,700	≤ $28,000	≤ $40,500	≤ $55,000	$70,800	≤ $89,700	≤ $113,200	≤ $149,100	≤ $212,100	≤ $286,300
Source: US Census Bureau, 2021; income statistics for the year 2021

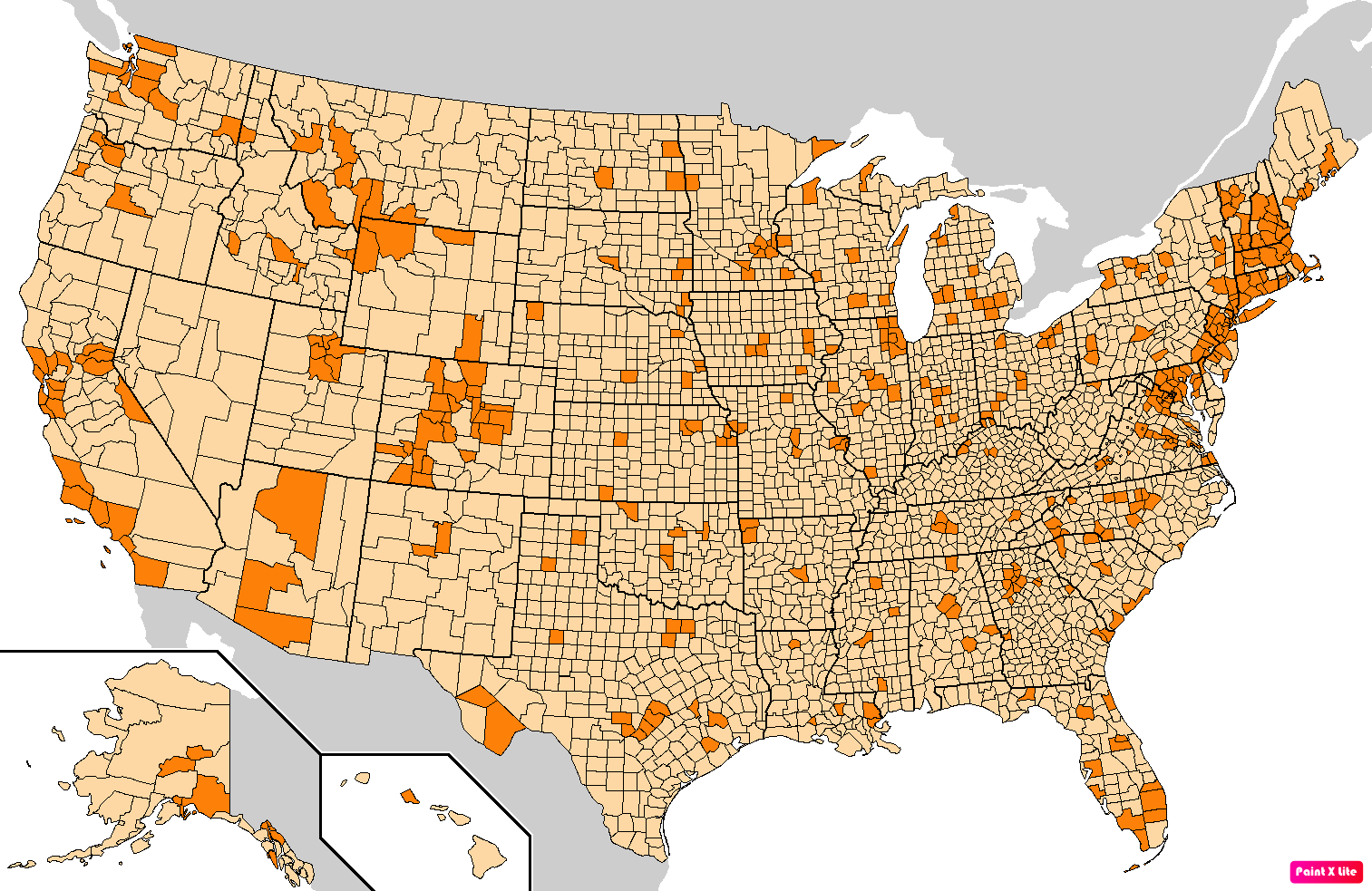
Counties in the United States by the percentage of the over 25-year-old population with bachelor's degrees according to the U.S. Census Bureau American Community Survey 2013–2017 5-Year Estimates. Counties with higher percentages of bachelor's degrees than the United States as a whole are in full orange.

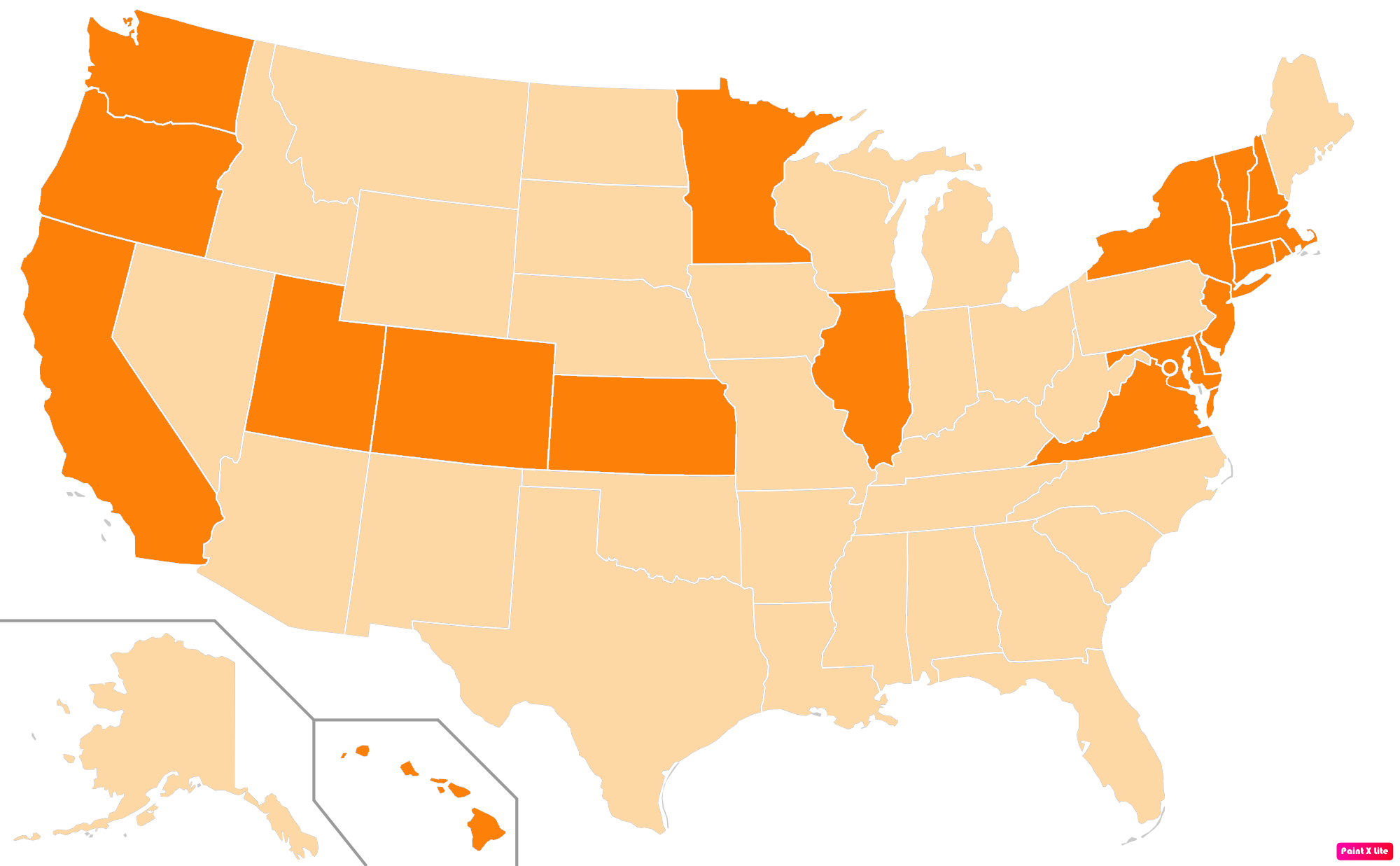
States in the United States by the percentage of the over 25-year-old population with bachelor's degrees according to the U.S. Census Bureau American Community Survey 2013–2017 5-Year Estimates. States with higher percentages of bachelor's degrees than the United States as a whole are in full orange.
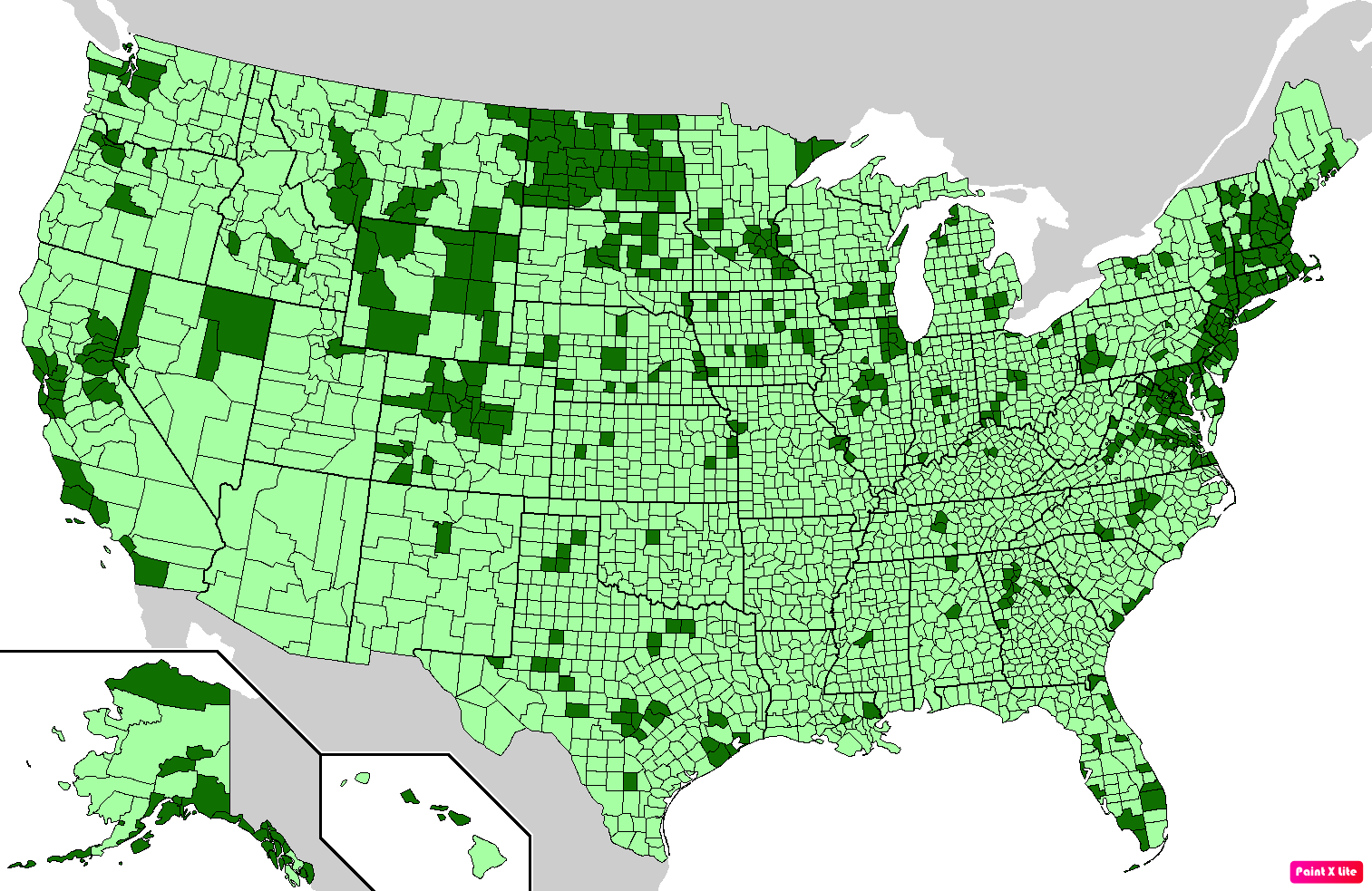
Counties in the United States by per capita income according to the U.S. Census Bureau American Community Survey 2013–2017 5-Year Estimates. Counties with per capita incomes higher than the United States as a whole are in full green.

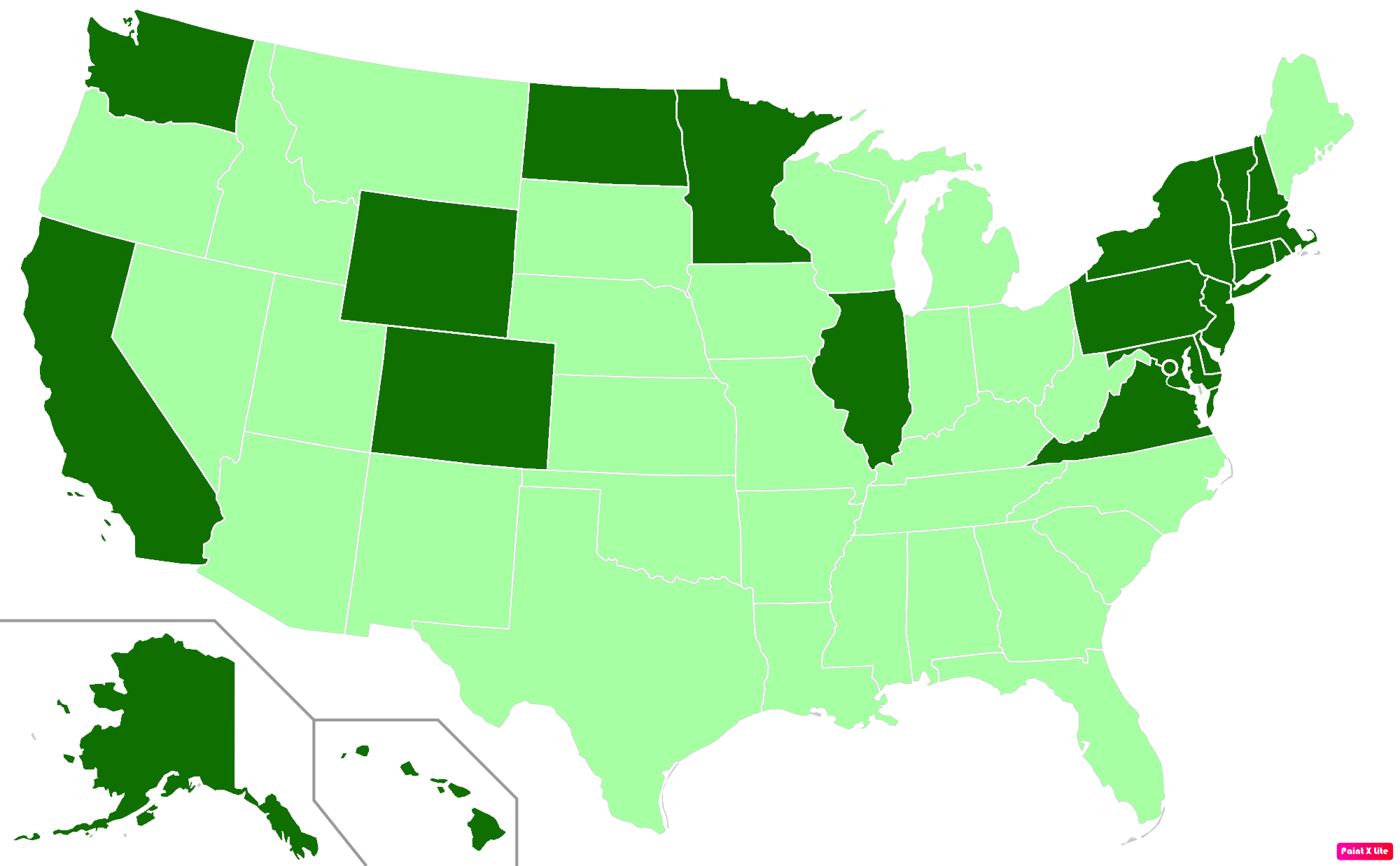
States in the United States by per capita income according to the U.S. Census Bureau American Community Survey 2013–2017 5-Year Estimates. States with per capita incomes higher than the United States as a whole are in full green.
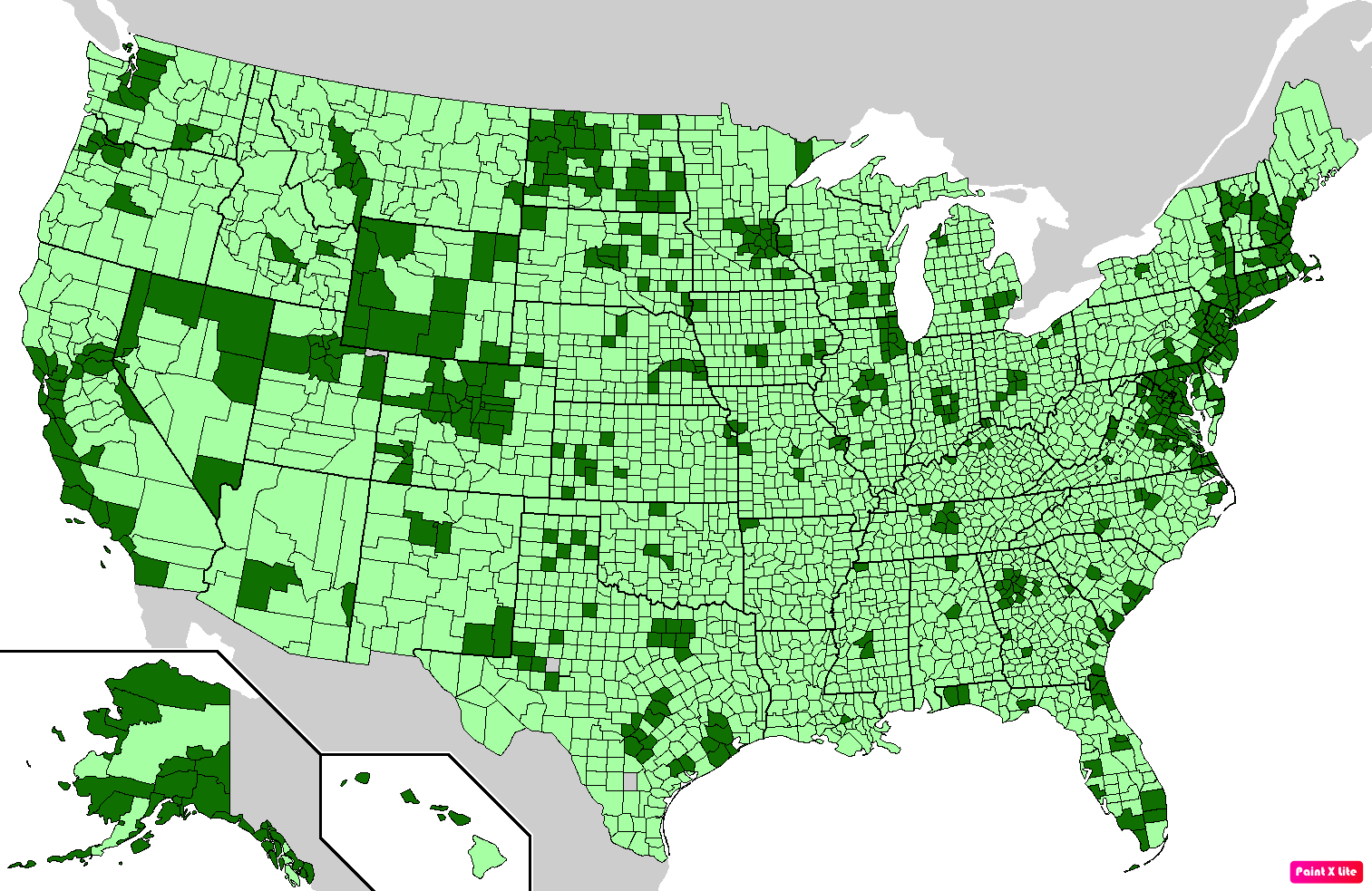
Counties in the United States by median nonfamily household income according to the U.S. Census Bureau American Community Survey 2013–2017 5-Year Estimates. Counties with median nonfamily household incomes higher than the United States as a whole are in full green.

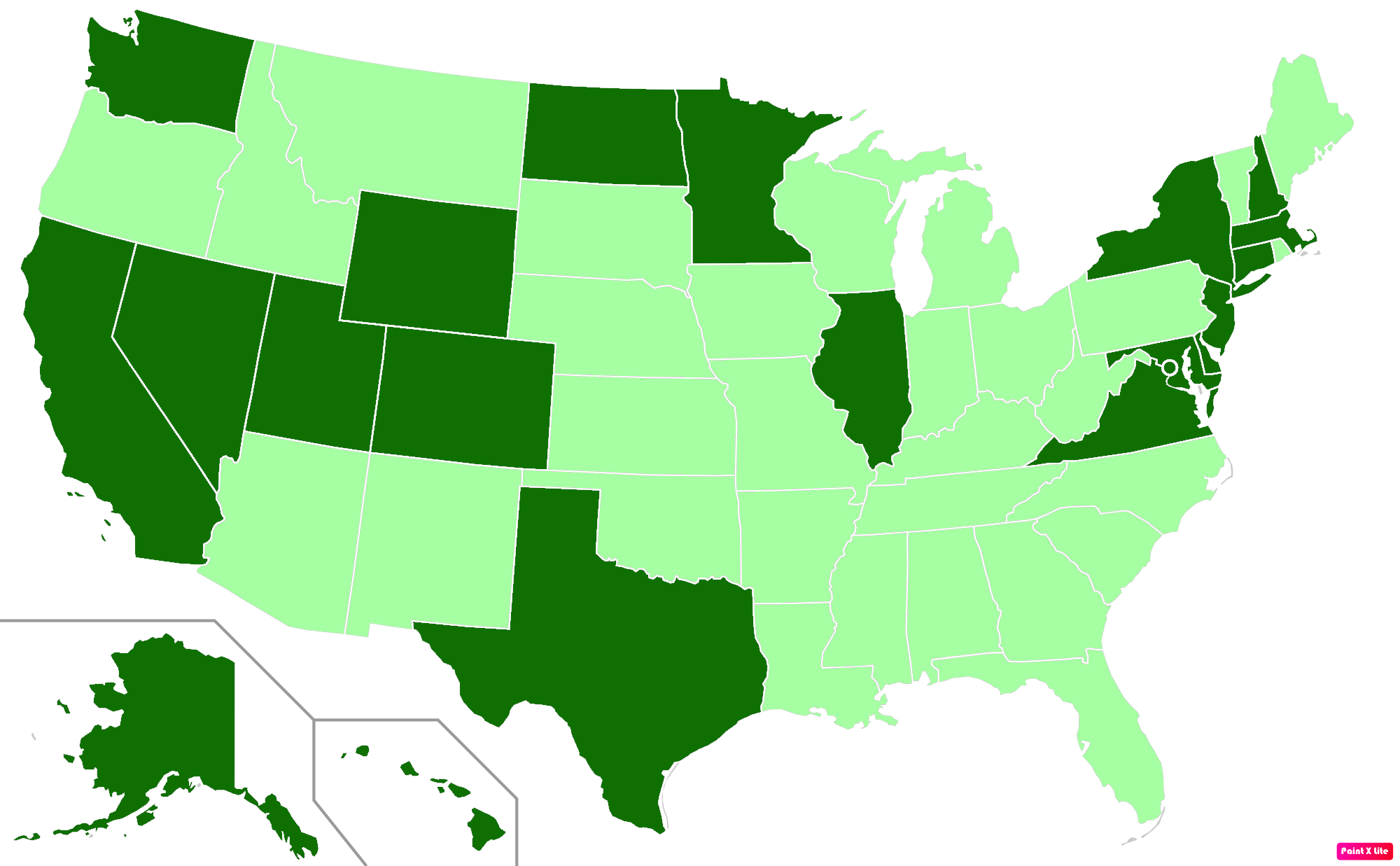
States in the United States by median nonfamily household income according to the U.S. Census Bureau American Community Survey 2013–2017 5-Year Estimates. States with median nonfamily household incomes higher than the United States as a whole are in full green.
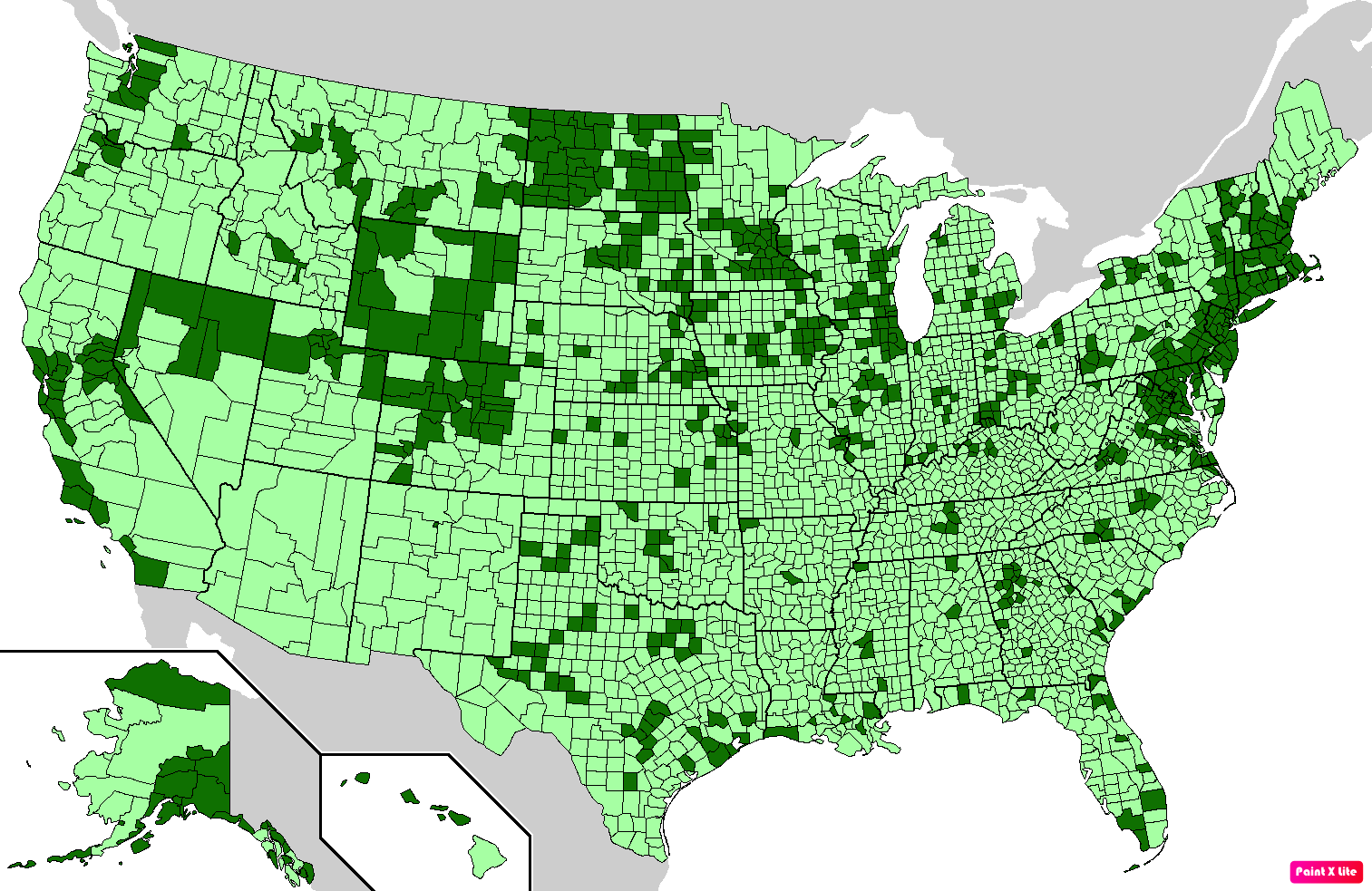
Counties in the United States by median family household income according to the U.S. Census Bureau American Community Survey 2013–2017 5-Year Estimates. Counties with median family household incomes higher than the United States as a whole are in full green.

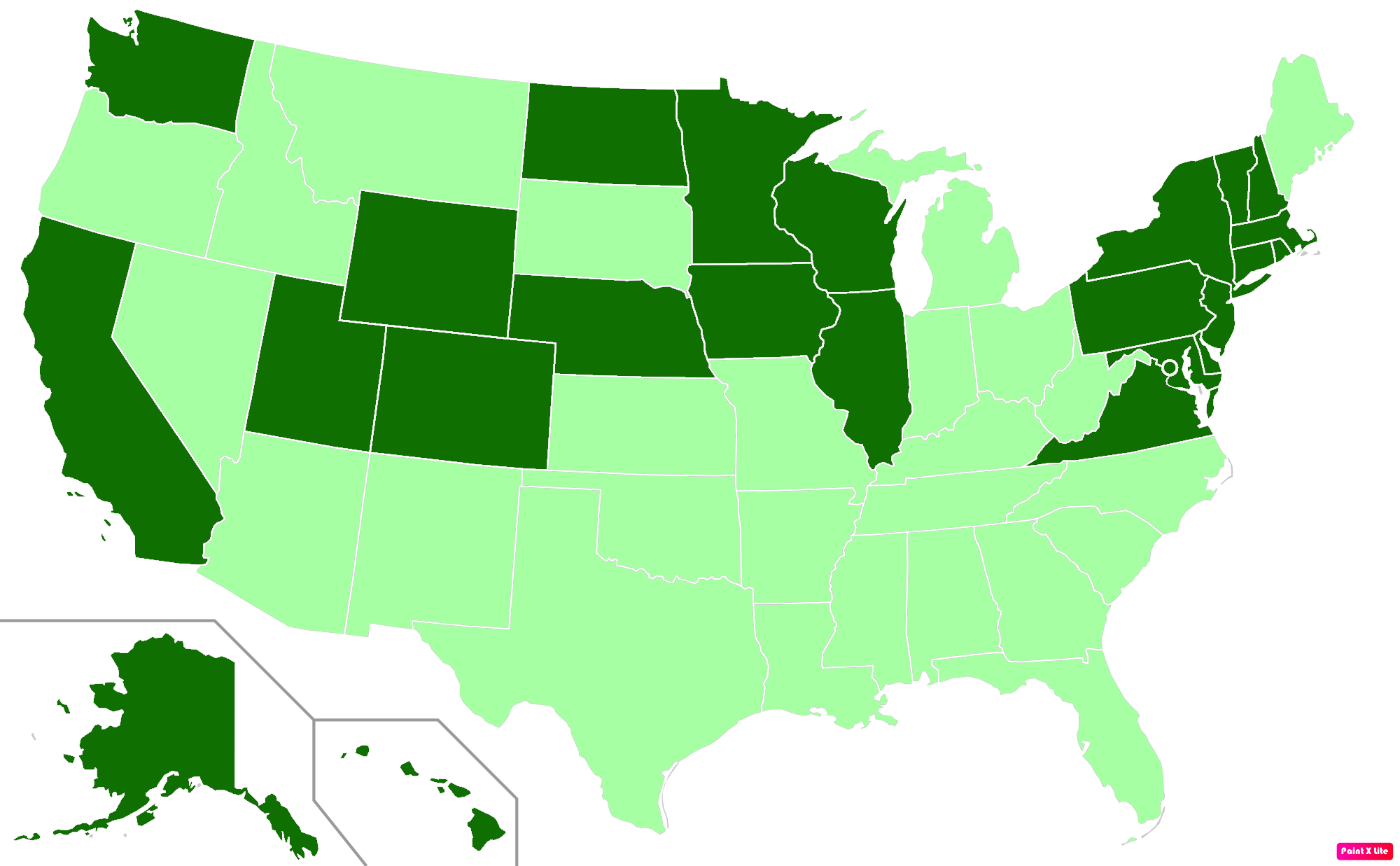
States in the United States by median family household income according to the U.S. Census Bureau American Community Survey 2013–2017 5-Year Estimates. States with median family household incomes higher than the United States as a whole are in full green.

=== Economic class ===
Social classes in the United States lack distinct boundaries and may overlap. Even their existence (when distinguished from economic strata) is controversial. The following table provides a summary of some prominent academic theories on the stratification of American society:

Academic class models
Dennis Gilbert, 2002		William Thompson & Joseph Hickey, 2005		Leonard Beeghley, 2004	
Class	Typical characteristics	Class	Typical characteristics	Class	Typical characteristics
Capitalist class (1%)	Top-level executives, high-rung politicians, heirs. Ivy League education common.	Upper class (1%)	Top-level executives, celebrities, heirs; income of $500,000+ common. Ivy League education common.	The super-rich (0.9%)	Multi-millionaires whose incomes commonly exceed $3.5 million or more; includes celebrities and powerful executives/politicians. Ivy League education common.
Upper middle class^{[1]} (15%)	Highly-educated (often with graduate degrees), most commonly salaried, professionals and middle management with large work autonomy.	Upper middle class^{[1]} (15%)	Highly-educated (often with graduate degrees) professionals & managers with household incomes varying from the high 5-figure range to commonly above $100,000.	The rich (5%)	Households with net worth of $1 million or more; largely in the form of home equity. Generally have college degrees.
Upper middle class^{[1]} (15%)	Highly-educated (often with graduate degrees), most commonly salaried, professionals and middle management with large work autonomy.	Upper middle class^{[1]} (15%)	Highly-educated (often with graduate degrees) professionals & managers with household incomes varying from the high 5-figure range to commonly above $100,000.	Middle class (plurality/ majority?; ca. 46%)	College-educated workers with considerably higher-than-average incomes and compensation; a man making $57,000 and a woman making $40,000 may be typical.
Lower middle class (30%)	Semi-professionals and craftsmen with a roughly average standard of living. Most have some college education and are white-collar.	Lower middle class (32%)	Semi-professionals and craftsmen with some work autonomy; household incomes commonly range from $35,000 to $75,000. Typically, some college education.	Middle class (plurality/ majority?; ca. 46%)	College-educated workers with considerably higher-than-average incomes and compensation; a man making $57,000 and a woman making $40,000 may be typical.
Working class (30%)	Clerical and most blue-collar workers whose work is highly routinized. Standard of living varies depending on number of income earners, but is commonly just adequate. High school education.	Lower middle class (32%)	Semi-professionals and craftsmen with some work autonomy; household incomes commonly range from $35,000 to $75,000. Typically, some college education.	Middle class (plurality/ majority?; ca. 46%)	College-educated workers with considerably higher-than-average incomes and compensation; a man making $57,000 and a woman making $40,000 may be typical.
Working class (30%)	Clerical and most blue-collar workers whose work is highly routinized. Standard of living varies depending on number of income earners, but is commonly just adequate. High school education.	Working class (32%)	Clerical, pink- and blue-collar workers with often low job security; common household incomes range from $16,000 to $30,000. High school education.	Working class (ca. 40–45%)	Blue-collar workers and those whose jobs are highly routinized with low economic security; a man making $40,000 and a woman making $26,000 may be typical. High school education.
Working poor (13%)	Service, low-rung clerical and some blue-collar workers. High economic insecurity and risk of poverty. Some high school education.	Working class (32%)	Clerical, pink- and blue-collar workers with often low job security; common household incomes range from $16,000 to $30,000. High school education.	Working class (ca. 40–45%)	Blue-collar workers and those whose jobs are highly routinized with low economic security; a man making $40,000 and a woman making $26,000 may be typical. High school education.
Working poor (13%)	Service, low-rung clerical and some blue-collar workers. High economic insecurity and risk of poverty. Some high school education.	Lower class (ca. 14–20%)	Those who occupy poorly-paid positions or rely on government transfers. Some high school education.	Working class (ca. 40–45%)	Blue-collar workers and those whose jobs are highly routinized with low economic security; a man making $40,000 and a woman making $26,000 may be typical. High school education.
Underclass (12%)	Those with limited or no participation in the labor force. Reliant on government transfers. Some high school education.	Lower class (ca. 14–20%)	Those who occupy poorly-paid positions or rely on government transfers. Some high school education.	The poor (ca. 12%)	Those living below the poverty line with limited to no participation in the labor force; a household income of $18,000 may be typical. Some high school education.
References: Gilbert, D. (2002) The American Class Structure: In An Age of Growing Inequality. Belmont, CA: Wadsworth, ISBN 0534541100. Thompson, W. & Hickey, J. (2005). Society in Focus. Boston, MA: Pearson, Allyn & Bacon; Beeghley, L. (2004). The Structure of Social Stratification in the United States. Boston, MA: Pearson, Allyn & Bacon.^{1} The upper middle class may also be referred to as "Professional class" Ehrenreich, B. (1989). The Inner Life of the Middle Class. NY, NY: Harper-Collins.

=== Unemployment rate (seasonally adjusted) ===
U.S. unemployment by state in December 2015 (official, or U3 rate) <3.0% <3.5% <4.0% <4.5% <5.0% <5.5% <6.0% <6.5% ≥6.5%

U.S. Unemployment Rate by Year (U3 Rate)
Year	Unemployment Rate
As of May 2025	4.2%
As of July 2024	4.2%
As of July 2023	3.5%
As of July 2022	3.5%
As of July 2021	5.4%
As of July 2020	10.2%
As of July 2019	3.7%
As of July 2018	3.7%
As of July 2017	4.3%
As of July 2016	4.9%
As of July 2015	5.3%
As of July 2014	6.2%

The U6 unemployment rate as of April 2017 was 8.6 percent. The U6 unemployment rate counts not only people without work seeking full-time employment (the more familiar U3 rate), but also counts "marginally attached workers and those working part-time for economic reasons". Some of these part-time workers counted as employed by U6 could be working as little as an hour a week. And the "marginally attached workers" include those who have become discouraged and stopped looking, but still want to work. The age considered for this calculation is 16 years and over.

Urban Americans have more job opportunities than those in more rural areas. From 2008 to 2018, 72% of the nation's employment growth occurred in cities with more than one million residents, which account for 56% of the overall population.

== Generational cohorts ==
A definitive recent study of U.S. generational cohorts was done by Schuman and Scott (2012) in which a broad sample of adults of all ages was asked, "What world events are especially important to you?" They found that 33 events were mentioned with great frequency. When the ages of the respondents were correlated with the expressed importance rankings, seven (some indicated eight or nine) distinct cohorts became evident.

Today the following descriptors are frequently used for these cohorts:

Generational Cohorts
Generation	Birth years	Notes	Citation
Lost Generation	1883 – 1900	Came of age during World War I; known for disillusionment and questioning of traditional values.	
Greatest Generation	1901 – 1927	Also called the "G.I. Generation"; fought in World War II.	
Silent Generation	1928 – 1945	Came of age in the postwar era; includes most who fought in the Korean War.	
Baby boomers	1946 – 1964	The large generation of children born after World War II to the Greatest and Silent Generations; also called "boomers".	
Generation X	1965 – 1980	Sometimes called the "baby bust" generation due to declining birth rates after the baby boom.	
Millennials	1981 – 1996	Also known as "Generation Y"; often the children of boomers.	
Generation Z	c. 1997 – 2012	Also known as "zoomers"; often the children of Generation X.	
Generation Alpha	Early 2010s – mid-2020s	First generation fully raised in a digital world; often the children of millennials.	

=== U.S. demographic birth cohorts ===
View source data.
Birth rate, death rate and natural increase rate in the United States 1935–2021

Subdivided groups are present when peak boom years or inverted peak bust years are present, and may be represented by a normal or inverted bell-shaped curve (rather than a straight curve). The boom subdivided cohorts may be considered as "pre-peak" (including peak year) and "post-peak". The year 1957 was the baby boom peak with 4.3 million births and 122.7 fertility rate. Although post-peak births (such as trailing edge boomers) are in decline, and sometimes referred to as a "bust", there are still a relatively large number of births. The dearth-in-birth bust cohorts include those up to the valley birth year, and those including and beyond, leading up to the subsequent normal birth rate. The baby boom began around 1943 to 1946.

From the decline in U.S. birth rates starting in 1958 and the introduction of the birth control pill in 1960, the Baby Boomer normal distribution curve is negatively skewed. The trend in birth rates from 1958 to 1961 show a tendency to end late in the decade at approximately 1969, thus returning to levels prior to World War II, with 12 years of rising and 12 years of declining birth rates. Pre-war birth rates were defined as anywhere between 1939 and 1941 by demographers such as the Taeuber's, Philip M. Hauser and William Fielding Ogburn.

== Mobility ==
In 2021, 27.1 million Americans said they were living in a different place than a year before, compared to 29.8 million in 2020. This reflects an 8.4% mover rate, the lowest recorded in more than 70 years.

== Education ==
In 2022 the most common level of highest educational attainment among those 25 years old and up (who were civilian and not institutionalized) was completing high school.

== Housing ==
According to the 2020 United States census, the country had a total of 140,498,736 housing units, of which 126,817,580 (90.3%) were occupied and 13,681,156 (9.7%) were classified as being vacant, irrespective of status ("for rent", "rented, not occupied", "for sale only", "sold, not occupied", "for seasonal, recreational, or occasional use", among others). Of the occupied units, 80,051,358 units (63.1%) were owner-occupied, while 46,766,222 units (36.9%) were occupied by tenants.

In the 2024 1-year American Community Survey the median number of rooms in a housing unit was 5.5 with the most common amount of rooms for a housing unit being 5 per unit. Homes have more excess bedrooms (bedrooms which are not occupied) than in the past compared to 1970 and 1980 but home sizes on average have decreased since the 2010s.

=== U.S. housing units ===
==== 1-year ACS estimates ====
Total number by year (1-year ACS estimates)
Year	Occupied			Vacant			Total	
Year	Total units		Margin of error	Total units		Margin of error	Total	
Year	#	%	Margin of error	#	%	Margin of error	#	Margin of error
2024	132,737,146	90.46%	140,273	14,003,818	9.54%	145,175	146,740,964	8,590
2023	131,332,360	90.37%	130,190	14,001,102	9.63%	137,938	145,333,462	10,062
2022	129,870,928	90.33%	136,261	13,901,967	9.67%	141,204	143,772,895	7,466
2021	127,544,730	89.73%	97,632	14,603,320	10.27%	99,060	142,148,050	4,219
2019	122,802,852	87.91%	137,327	16,883,357	12.09%	142,908	139,686,209	6,973
2018	121,520,180	87.71%	153,217	17,019,726	12.29%	155,617	138,539,906	4,033

==== 5-year ACS estimates ====
For reference, the 5-year ACS estimate is taken every year is collected for all areas regardless of population over a 5-year period compared to the 1-year estimates which are collected within a year and only cover areas with a population at or over 65,000+ people.

Total number by year (5-year ACS estimates)
Year	Occupied			Vacant			Total	
Year	Total units		Margin of error	Total units		Margin of error	#	Margin of error
Year	#	%	Margin of error	#	%	Margin of error	#	Margin of error
2024	129,227,496	89.88%	209,365	14,547,859	10.12%	200,366	143,775,355	10,234
2023	127,482,865	89.57%	208,633	14,850,011	10.43%	200,112	142,332,876	9,434
2022	125,736,353	89.21%	198,714	15,207,260	10.79%	198,996	140,943,613	3,164
2021	124,010,992	88.8%	196,755	15,636,028	11.2%	197,425	139,647,020	3,504
2020	122,354,219	88.39%	201,880	16,078,532	11.61%	201,880	138,432,751	11,188
2019	120,756,048	87.87%	236,892	16,672,938	12.13%	231,631	137,428,986	6,044
2018	119,730,128	87.79%	232,429	16,654,164	12.21%	226,286	136,384,292	6,639

=== Housing and year of construction ===
A plurality of housing units were built in the 1970s according to 2024 1-year American Community Survey and the 5-year survey. Data is as of the 2024 1-year American Community Survey. Table source:

Year built	Number of units	Percentage of units	Margin of error (#)
2020–present	5,967,001	4.07%	57,397
2010–2019	14,282,223	9.73%	63,223
2000–2009	19,982,040	13.62%	66,348
1990–1999	17,382,714	11.85%	69,938
1980–1989	18,481,899	12.59%	63,887
1970–1979	20,140,923	13.73%	80,917
1960–1969	14,113,943	9.62%	68,220
1950–1959	13,358,031	9.1%	62,729
1940–1949	6,210,969	4.23%	44,283
1939 and before	16,821,221	11.46%	63,157
Total	146,740,964	100%	

=== Homes with or without select services ===
==== Phone service ====
Data covers from 1-year American Community Survey estimates.

Status	With phone service		Without phone service		Margin of error		Total
Year	#	%	#	%	#	%	Total
2024	131,676,585	99.2%	1,060,561	0.8%	19,688	0.01%	132,737,146
2023	130,143,547	99.09%	1,188,813	0.91%	20,578	0.02%	131,332,360
2022	128,659,397	99.07%	1,211,531	0.93%	21,895	0.02%	129,870,928
2021	127,021,978	99.59%	522,752	0.41%	14,103	0.01%	127,544,730
2019	122,341,573	99.62%	461,279	0.38%	14,466	0.01%	122,802,852
2018	121,054,969	99.62%	465,211	0.38%	11,372	0.01%	121,520,180
2017	119,603,368	99.62%	459,450	0.38%	10,397	0.01%	120,062,818

==== Plumbing ====
This table only looks at occupied housing units and this table shows results from the 1-year American Community Survey. No data is available for 2020.

Status	With full plumbing		Lacking full plumbing		Margin of error for homes lacking plumbing		Total
Year	#	%	#	%	#	%	Total
2024	132,190,518	99.59%	546,628	0.41%	13,967	0.01%	132,737,146
2023	130,785,732	99.58%	548,772	0.42%	13,917	0.01%	131,332,360
2022	129,337,134	99.59%	533,794	0.41%	13,435	0.01%	129,870,928
2021	127,021,978	99.59%	522,752	0.41%	14,103	0.01%	127,544,730
2019	122,341,573	99.62%	461,279	0.38%	14,466	0.01%	122,802,852
2018	121,054,969	99.62%	465,211	0.38%	11,372	0.01%	121,520,180
2017	119,603,368	99.62%	459,450	0.38%	10,397	0.01%	120,062,818

=== Homes and heating ===
It was also reported in the 2024 1-year American Community survey that among occupied housing units the most common fuel for heating was "Utility gas". The same was true of the 5-year survey also from 2024.

== See also ==
- Aging of the United States
- Demographic history of the United States
  - Historical racial and ethnic demographics of the United States
  - Emigration from the United States
- History of public health in the United States
- Historical Statistics of the United States, the book
- Languages of the United States
- Maps of American ancestries
- Places in the United States with notable demographic characteristics

=== Lists ===
- List of metropolitan areas in the Americas
- List of U.S. states and territories by fertility rate
- List of U.S. states and territories by population
- List of U.S. states and territories by race/ethnicity
- List of U.S. states by socioeconomic factors
- Lists of U.S. cities with non-white majority populations

==== Income ====
- Affluence in the United States
- Household income in the United States
- List of highest-income counties in the United States
- List of lowest-income counties in the United States
- Personal income in the United States

==== Population ====
- List of metropolitan statistical areas
- List of United States counties and county equivalents
- Office of Management and Budget
  - Statistical area (United States)
    - Combined statistical area (list)
    - Core-based statistical area (list)
      - Metropolitan statistical area (list)
      - Micropolitan statistical area (list)
- United States urban area (list)
