= Kyrgyz American Foundation =

American-based foundation

- Кыргыз-Америка фонду (Kyrgyz)
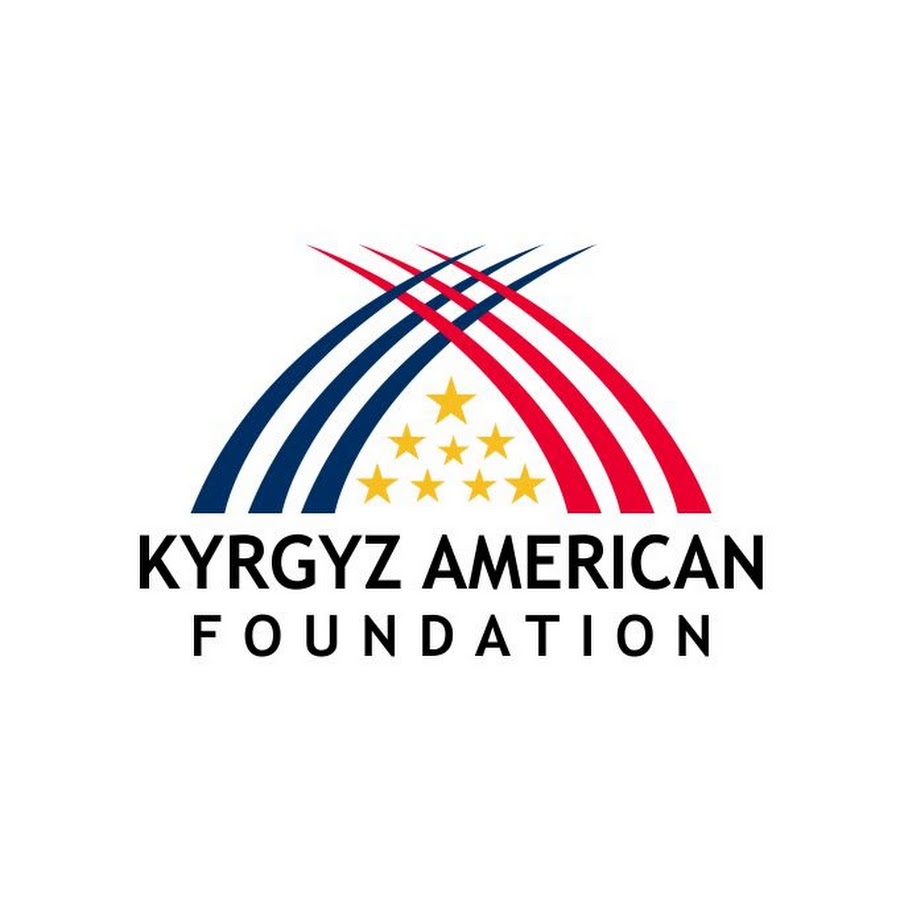
- Abbreviation: KAF
- Formation: 2016
- Founder: Azamat Sydykov
- Type: Non-Profit NGO
- Headquarters: Manhattan, New York City
- Coordinates: 40°49′28.39″N 73°57′14.98″W
- Website: https://www.kyrgyzamericanfoundation.org/

Kyrgyz American Foundation (Kyrgyz: Кыргыз-Америка фонду / قىرعىز-امەرىكا فوندۇ; abbreviated KAF) is a significant cultural and educational organization of the Kyrgyz diaspora in the United States. It is a non-profit organization located in Manhattan, New York City, at 635 Riverside Drive.

The mission of the association is to preserve the cultural, ethnic, and religious interests of the local Kyrgyz community.

== History ==
It was founded in 2016 by Azamat Sydykov, a pianist and music director from Kyrgyzstan, with the participation of American pianists and composers Jonathan Levine and Joel Martin, as well as Kyrgyz-Israeli composer Mikhail Burshtin. According to its founder, the organization was established to preserve Kyrgyz national culture and language while also promoting them in the United States. To mark its founding, a gala concert of Kyrgyz classical and folk music was held in Chicago on November 5, dedicated to the 25th anniversary of Kyrgyzstan’s independence.

In February 2020, members of the foundation expressed opposition to the announcement by U.S. President Donald Trump of visa restrictions affecting Kyrgyz citizens.

On October 21, 2020, the foundation participated in a virtual roundtable discussion on the Kyrgyz diaspora in the United States, held in cooperation with the New York City Mayor’s Office. The discussion focused on migration, mobility, and diaspora studies, with an emphasis on the characteristics of the Kyrgyz community in the United States. Participants included Saltanat Liebert of Virginia Commonwealth University, Erica Marat of the National Defense University, Hanif Yazdi of the Mayor's Office of Immigrant Affairs, and Maria Markh, a New York City public servant.

== Celebrations ==
- The Eurasia Festival, which features opera and concert seasons.
- Gala concerts of classical and traditional music in iconic venues featuring master komuz players and world-renowned pianists, often in collaboration with the Soros Foundation-Kyrgyzstan.
- Exhibitions and film screenings of Central Asian artists and retrospectives.
- Educational music, dance, and art sessions led by visiting professors and artists from the United States and Central Asia.
