= Kyrgyz Americans =

Americans of Kyrgyz descent

Кыргыз америкалыктар (Kyrgyz) Кыргызские американцы (Russian)

Total population
- 8,785 alone or in combination (2020 Census) Other Estimates >50,000

Regions with significant populations
- Boston • New York City • Long Island • Philadelphia • Chicago • San Francisco • Arlington Heights (IL)

Languages
- English • Kyrgyz • Russian

Religion
- Majority Islam; Minority Orthodox Christianity • atheism

Related ethnic groups
- Kyrgyz Canadians, Kazakh Americans, Uzbek Americans, Tajik Americans, Turkmen Americans

Kyrgyz Americans (Kyrgyz: Кыргыз америкалыктар) are Americans of full or partial Kyrgyz descent. The majority of Kyrgyz Americans have emigrated to the United States from Kyrgyzstan since the country's independence from the Soviet Union in 1991.

== History ==
Most Kyrgyz migrants moved to the United States in the late 20th century, following the break-up of the Soviet Union. Kyrgyz immigration to the United States was primarily driven by economic factors, particularly by economic instability in Kyrgyzstan following the collapse of the USSR.

The number of Kyrgyz immigrants living in the United States is estimated to be between 30,000 and 50,000. However, the exact number is difficult to determine as some Kyrgyz Americans may be undocumented migrants. According to the 2020 Census, 8,785 Americans identified as Kyrgyz alone or in combination with other groups.

Kyrgyz Americans are primarily concentrated in several major cities in the United States, with Chicago being the most popular among them. According to the 2020 Census, 1,898 people identified as Kyrgyz in Illinois, the most of any state in the country.

== Organizations ==
Kyrgyz Americans have established several organizations to support and preserve their cultural heritage in the United States.

The Kyrgyz American Foundation is a non-profit organization based in New York. It was founded in 2019 with the aim of promoting and preserving Kyrgyz culture, heritage and language in the diaspora. The foundation provides a platform for Kyrgyz Americans to connect with each other, as well as with their ancestral homeland.

The Kyrgyz Community Center in Arlington Heights, a suburb of Chicago, is another important organization for Kyrgyz Americans. The center was established to serve as a hub for the Kyrgyz community in the Chicago area. It provides a space for community members to come together, host cultural events and celebrate their heritage. The center also serves as a resource for Kyrgyz Americans in the Chicago area, offering information on immigration, employment, and other practical matters.

== See also ==
- Central Asians in the United States
- Kyrgyzstan–United States relations
