= Kazakh Canadians =

Канададағы қазақтар Kanadadağy qazaqtar (Kazakh) Canadiens kazakhs (French) Казахские канадцы (Russian)

Total population
- 3,330 (by ancestry, 2016 Census)

Regions with significant populations
- Ontario and Quebec

Languages
- Canadian English · Canadian French · Kazakh · Russian

Religion
- Sunni Islam, Christianity, Tengrism

Kazakh Canadians (Kazakh: Канададағы қазақтар, romanized: Kanadadağy qazaqtar) are Canadian citizens of Kazakh descent or persons of Kazakh descent residing in Canada. According to the 2016 Census there were 3,330 Canadians who claimed Kazakh ancestry. An Association of Kazakhs in Canada was established on November 12, 2003, in Toronto, Ontario.

== Notable Kazakh Canadians ==
- Nik Antropov, NHL hockey player
- Anjelika Reznik, gymnast
- Victoria Reznik, gymnast
- Sanzhar Sultanov, film director
- Ola Volo, artist

== See also ==
- Middle Eastern Canadians
- West Asian Canadians
- Canada–Kazakhstan relations
- Kazakh Americans
