= Kazakh Americans =

АҚШ-тағы қазақтар AQŞ-tağy qazaqtar (Kazakh)

Total population
- By ancestry or ethnic origin (2020 US census); 19,080: Kazakh-born, 2023; 50,833

Regions with significant populations
- New York, California, Oregon, Montana, Georgia, Minnesota, Virginia, Alaska, Washington, Wyoming, Pennsylvania, Kansas, Texas, and Colorado

Languages
- American English · Kazakh · Russian

Religion
- Majority Sunni Islam

Related ethnic groups
- Kazakh Canadians, Kazakh Australians, Kyrgyz Americans, Uyghur Americans, Mongolian Americans, Kalmyk Americans

Kazakh Americans (Kazakh: АҚШ-тағы қазақтар/AQŞ-tağy qazaqtar) are Americans of full or partial Kazakh ancestry. Although the population of Kazakh origin in United States was estimated at 30,030 in the 1960s, the 2000 census put the population size at less than 300.

== Overview ==
Kazakhs began to emigrate to the United States after World War II. Shortly after the war, some citizens of the former Kazakh Soviet Socialist Republic who had been captured during World War II migrated to the United States following their liberation by Allied troops.

The Kazakh diaspora in the United States has increased through inter-ethnic marriages. In addition, since the dissolution of the Soviet Union in 1991, the diaspora has increased due to the Diversity Immigrant Visa program, employment-based immigration channels for scientists and engineers such as H-1B visas, EBGC, and international child adoption. Kazakhs form communities in places as Reston, Virginia, with the largest Kazakh populations by county being Kings County, New York and Los Angeles County, California.

== Organizations ==
The Kazakh American Association, a non-profit organization established in Reston, Virginia, was founded to respond to the social, cultural, educational, and recreational needs of Kazakh people visiting the United States and to preserve and strengthen the heritage and culture of Kazakhs people in the US.

The Kazakh Aul of the United States is a nonprofit organization that is dedicated to Kazakh cultural education and support of the Kazakh population in US. The aul runs a summer camp called Zhailau Heritage Camp, which is focused on bringing Kazakh culture into the lives of Kazakh adoptees in the US. They can make friends with other adoptees and meet Kazakh adults who serve as role models. The association is founded by Kazakhs and Americans.

Other Kazakh American organizations include the Kazakh Student Association at Indiana University, established in 1996, and the North American Kazakh Association, a non-profit organization established in Seattle, Washington in 2024.

== Notable people ==
- Ken Alibek, formerly Soviet physician, microbiologist and biological warfare expert
- Saule Omarova, Kazakh-born attorney and former nominee to serve as Comptroller of the Currency
- Mukhtar Magauin, Kazakh writer and publicist, spent his last years in the United States

== See also ==
- Central Asian Americans
- Kazakhstan–United States relations
- Kazakh Canadians
