= Goldsea =

American online magazine

- Categories: Asian-American online magazine
- First issue: 1998
- Country: United States
- Language: English
- Website: goldsea.com

Goldsea is an American online magazine. The magazine was started in 1998. It is aimed at Asian Americans and publishes interviews and profiles of successful Asian Americans. The "Goldsea 100" celebrates high-achieving Asian-American businesspeople and includes several billionaires, including one aged only 32.

In 2006, Ford launched an advertising campaign of the site along with one other website and Asian television advertisements as part of an advertising campaign targeted at Korea, China and Vietnam.

Goldsea.com has been cited by Asian news sources.
