= Pyong Gap Min =

Korean sociologist

- Hangul: 민병갑
- RR: Min Byeonggap
- MR: Min Pyŏnggap

Pyong Gap Min (Korean: 민병갑; born February 18, 1942) is a sociologist, currently a Distinguished Professor of Sociology at the Graduate Center of the City University of New York and Queens College, City University of New York. He is also the Director of the Research Center for Korean Community at Queens College and a published author. In 2012, he was awarded the Distinguished Career Award by the American Sociological Association.

Min is a sociologist in the fields of race, immigration, ethnic identity, ethnic entrepreneurship, Korean immigration and settlement patterns, new immigrants and their religious practices, and the "comfort women" issue and redress movement for the victims of Japanese military sexual slavery in the United States.

== Biography ==
Pyong Gap Min was born in a small village in Chungcheong-namdo (South Chungcheong Province) in South Korea in 1942. After completing a B.A. in history at Seoul National University (1970), he immigrated to the United States in 1972 and subsequently earned an M.A. in history at Georgia State University as well as two Ph.D. degrees from Georgia State University—one in Philosophy of Education (1979) and the second one in Sociology (1983). After being a part-time instructor and research associate at Georgia State University for a few years, he was hired as a tenure-track assistant professor at Queens College, City University of New York (CUNY) in 1987, where he has continuously taught and conducted research up until the present. In 2009, he founded a non-profit academic research center called The Research Center for Korean Community (RCKC) at Queens College. He has served as the director of RCKC since its inception.

Min is frequently quoted in Korean-language and English-language media outlets, both in the metropolitan New York area and South Korea. He has written seven single-authored books and has edited and co-edited fourteen anthologies. In addition, he has authored and co-authored at least 55 articles in peer-reviewed academic journals. He has also written 65 chapters included in edited volumes, and 45 book reviews in academic journals.

== Sociological research ==
Early in his academic career, Min was a scholar of educational philosophy and was very interested in John Dewey and pragmatic ethics, as evidenced by his first two peer-reviewed journal articles. After earning his second Ph.D. (Georgia State University, 1983), his research interests shifted. The first phase of his sociological career was characterized by research on ethnic entrepreneurship, using Korean-owned small businesses as case studies. Between 1984 and 1991, he published a number of peer-reviewed articles on the topic, and in 1988, he published his first single-authored book, Ethnic Business Enterprise: Korean Small Business in Atlanta. He then published a number of articles and books related to ethnic identity, ethnic attachment, and eventually, immigrants and their religious practices. During the latter part of his career, Min became extremely interested in the Japanese military's forceful mobilization of Korean girls and young women to military brothels—widely known as the “comfort women” issue—during the Asia-Pacific War. In addition to publishing journal articles and a monograph and an edited book on the subject, he also became very involved in the redress movement for the victims of Japanese military sexual slavery, acting as an activist-scholar. In 2017, Min organized and hosted an international conference on the “comfort women” issue and the redress movement; he also presented a paper at the conference, which became part of an edited volume. As Korean food and popular entertainment such as K-pop and K-dramas have become increasingly popular around the world, Min has developed major interest in transnationalism. In 2022, he published his most recent monograph, Transnational Cultural Flow From Home: Korean Community in Greater New York.

== Awards and grants ==
In 1986, Min received a research grant from the National Science Foundation (NSF) for his research on the positive functions of ethnic business for Korean immigrants in Los Angeles. In 1991, he was recognized by the New York City Comptroller's office and presented with an award for Contribution to Community Research on the Occasion of Asian and Pacific Islander Heritage Month. In 1997 and 1998, he received two separate prestigious awards for his monograph, Caught in the Middle: Korean Merchants in New York and Los Angeles; in 1997, he received The National Book Award in Social Science by the Association for Asian American Studies, and in 1998, he received The Outstanding Book Award from the Section on Asia and Asian America of the American Sociological Association (ASA). In 2005, Min received another grant from the National Science Foundation (NSF) for a research project titled “The Effect of Immigrant Entrepreneurship on Ethnic Attachment and Solidarity: A Comparison of Chinese, Indian, and Korean Immigrants in New York;” a year later in 2006, he received the Visiting Scholar Fellowship from the Russell Sage Foundation to provide support while he worked on writing a book on the same topic for which he received the NSF grant. In the autumn of 2009, he received an individual contribution of $200,000 from Francis An of Bogopa Inc. to establish The Research Center for Korean Community (RCKC) at Queens College. In 2010, Min published the monograph Preserving Ethnicity through Religion in America: Korean Protestants and Indian Hindus across Generations, and he received a number of awards for this book, including The Outstanding Book Award from the Association for the Studies of Koreans Abroad (2010), The Honorable Mention in the Thomas and Znaniecki Book Award from the International Migration Section of the ASA (2011), and The Honorable Mention Award in the Best Book Award from the Sociology of Religion section of the ASA (2012). In 2017, Min received The Presidential Award from the government of the Republic of Korea for his myriad services to the Korean community. In 2019, he received The Contribution to the Field of Study Award from the section on Asia and Asian America of the ASA. That same year, he also received a $50,000 grant from the One Asia Foundation (Japan) for creating an interdisciplinary course titled “Peace in Asian Countries: From Conflicts to Reconciliation.”

== Selected publications ==
· Transnational Cultural Flow from Home: Korean Community in Greater New York, Rutgers University Press, 2022

· Korean “Comfort Women”: Military Brothels, Brutality, and the Redress Movement, Rutgers University Press, 2021

· The Transnational Redress Movement for the Victims of Japanese Military Sexual Slavery (co-edited with Thomas R. Chung and Sejung Sage Yim), De Gruyter/Oldenbourg, 2020

· Koreans in North America: Their Twenty-First Century Experiences (edited volume), Lexington Books, 2013

· Preserving Ethnicity through Religion: Korean Protestants and Indian Hindus New York University Press, 2010

· Ethnic Solidarity for Economic Survival: Korean Greengrocers in New York Russell Sage Foundation, 2008

· Asian Americans: Contemporary Trends and Issues, Second Edition (edited volume), Pine Forge Press, 2006

· Encyclopedia of Racism in the United States (3-volume edited anthology), Greenwood Press, 2005

· Changes and Conflicts: Korean Immigrant Families in New York, Allyn and Bacon, 1998

· Caught in the Middle: Korean Communities in New York and Los Angeles University of California Press, 1996
