= Turkmen Americans =

Total population
- 1,452 Turkmen alone; 3,270 Turkmen alone or in combination (2020 census)

Languages
- American English • Turkmen

Religion
- Islam

Related ethnic groups
- Central Asian Americans

Turkmen Americans are Americans whose ethnic origins lie fully or partially in any part of Turkmenistan.

According to the United States Census Bureau, in 2020, there were 1,452 individuals with Turkmen as their sole ethnicity in the United States, and a further 1,818 who were Turkmen as well as another ethnicity. An estimated 1150 migrants from Turkmenistan received a green card between 2013 and 2017.

An ethnographic study of female Turkmen immigrants in California, found that the immigrant women followed networks of other immigrants to arrive in the United States, maintained social ties with family in their home country, and sent remittances as part of those ties.

In June 2025, second Trump administration prohibited Turkmeni nationals from receiving immigration, tourist, or student visas, in one element of its restrictive immigration policies. In December 2025, the administration imposed restrictions on more countries' nationals, but removed restrictions on non-immigrant visas for those from Turkmenistan. It began reviews of green card holders from designated "countries of concern" including Turkmenistan.

== See also ==
- Central Asian Americans
