= Tajik Americans =

Americans of Tajikistani or Tajik birth or descent

Total population
- 8,245 (by ancestry or ethnic origin; US census in 2020)

Regions with significant populations
- New York; Chicago; Nebraska; Washington, D.C.; Pennsylvania; New Jersey

Languages
- English; Tajik; Russian; Uzbek

Religion
- Islam; Russian Orthodoxy; Judaism

Related ethnic groups
- Iranian Americans

Tajik Americans (Tajik: Тоҷикони Амрико, romanized: Tojikoni Amriko) are Americans who trace their origin to Tajikistan, or Samarkand and Bukhara region of Uzbekistan. The majority of Tajik Americans are ethnic Tajiks. A significant amount are also non-Tajik Bukharian Jews or Russians.

== Demography ==
About 6,000 Tajiks live in the US, although this number could be as high as 100,000 if you consider the Tajiks who migrated to the US as Uzbek nationals. Most reside in Brooklyn, Philadelphia, Chicago as well as in Washington, D.C. Many come to the U.S. to study and work. Most Tajiks who emigrated to work get the right of permanent residence. Most second-generation Tajiks can speak their original language, while those of mixed descent mainly speak English. Many marry other Tajiks because of their cultural affinity.

== Associations ==
Several Tajik associations operate in the U.S. One is the American-Tajik Association, established in Brooklyn, whose goal is to unite the Tajik diaspora, giving them a forum to gather and celebrate their culture.

In May 2012, the Tajik American Cultural Association (TACA) was founded by Tajik local volunteers Vladimir Fedorenko, Anvar Samadzoda, Akobir Akhmedov and Faridun Nazarov in Fairfax, Virginia as a non-profit, non-governmental, cultural, professional, and educational organization. The mission of TACA is to promote and facilitate intercultural understanding and cooperation by organizing educational and cultural programs that focus on issues concerning the Tajik American community. In addition, TACA strives to address the needs of the Tajik community in America. TACA believes that building cultural bridges among Tajik and American communities is needed and aims to promote further integration, encourage cooperation and establish close relations with other US communities.

== Notable people ==
- Malika Kalontarova, dancer of Bukharian Jewish origin
- Rus Yusupov, businessman of Bukharian Jewish origin

== See also ==
- Central Asians in the United States
- Tajikistan–United States relations
- Tajik Canadians
