= Central Asian Americans =

People of Central Asian descent in the United States

Total population
- Total: ~450,000; 62,713 (Uzbek), 50,833 (Kazakh)

Regions with significant populations
- New York City · New Jersey · Philadelphia · San Antonio · Houston · San Francisco · San Jose · Los Angeles · Washington, D.C. · Nebraska · Chicago · Northern Virginia

Languages
- American English · Baloch · Dari · Kazakh · Kyrgyz · Pashto · Russian · Tajik · Turkmen · Uyghur · Uzbek

Religion
- Islam · Eastern Orthodoxy · Judaism

Central Asian Americans are Americans of Central Asian ancestry. They include Kazakh, Kyrgyz, Tajik, Turkmen, and Uzbek individuals. People of Afghan, Baloch, and Uyghur descent are also sometimes classified as Central Asians. Although previously not mentioned under any category, Central Asians are now categorized as Asian Americans as of 2024.

== Kazakh Americans ==
Kazakhs began to emigrate to the United States after World War II. Shortly after of the war, some Kazakh Soviet citizens, who were captured during World War II, after their liberation by Allied troops migrated to the United States.

== Kyrgyz Americans ==
The emigration of Kyrgyz to the United States began in the 1970s, when hundreds of Afghan Kyrgyz were forced to urgently evacuate from Afghanistan during the Afghan war. However, mass emigration to the United States began in the 1990s after the dissolution of the Soviet Union and political instability in the post-Soviet space.

The number of Kyrgyz immigrants living in the United States is estimated at 30,000 to 50,000. However, the exact number is difficult to determine because some Kyrgyz Americans may be undocumented migrants.

As a rule, migration is carried out using the green card lottery.

== Tajik Americans ==
According to the 2020 census, Tajik Americans number over 8,000 people. Most of them live in the eastern United States, in cities such as New York City, Philadelphia and Washington DC.

== Turkmen Americans ==
Turkmen Americans are a very small ethnic group in the United States. The exact number of Turkmen Americans is not well-documented, and they are not as prominent or numerous as some other ethnic groups in the country.

== Uzbek Americans ==
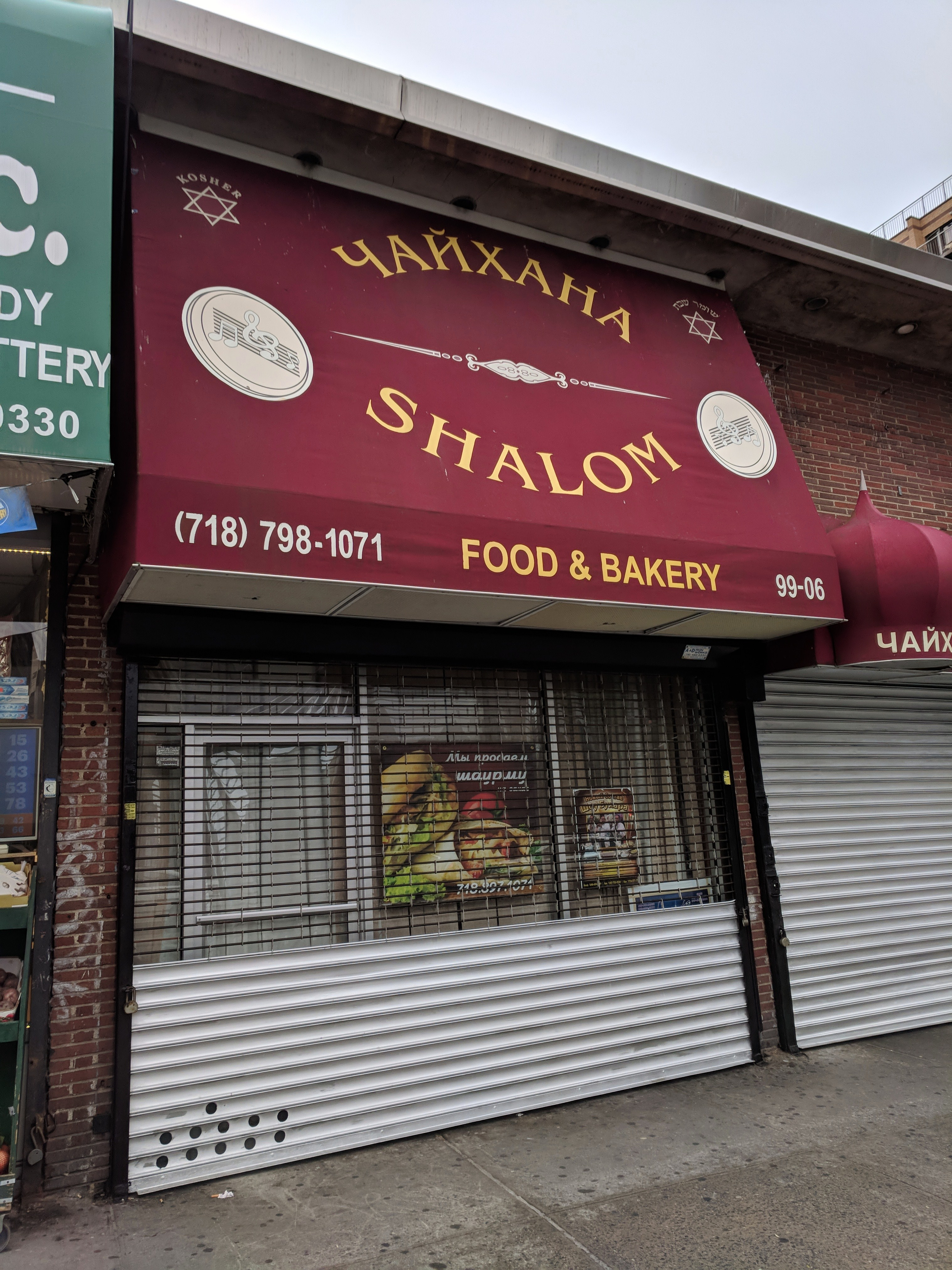
Tandoori Food and Bakery, a kosher Bukharan Jewish Uzbek restaurant in Rego Park, Queens, June 2018

Excluding Afghan Americans, Uzbek Americans are the largest Central Asian population in the United States. 62,713 Uzbeks live in the United States, with the largest community existing in the New York City metropolitan area. The New York area Uzbek community is diverse and has three main sub-communities: Uzbek Muslims who first came to the United States in the 1980s as political refugees from the Soviet Union living in Morris County, New Jersey, many of whom are staunchly anti-communist and upwardly mobile; newer Uzbek Muslim immigrants to New York City who have benefited from the green card lottery, 20,000 of whom have settled in Brooklyn since the 2000s; and the Bukharan Jews who mostly live in Queens, many of whom have done well in real estate and the Diamond District.

=== Bukharan Jews ===
The United States has the largest community of Bukharan Jews in the world outside of Israel. 70,000 Bukharian Jews reside in the United States, with 50,000 living in the New York City borough of Queens alone. The Bukharan Jews are concentrated in the neighborhoods of Rego Park, Queens and Forest Hills.

== Afghan Americans ==
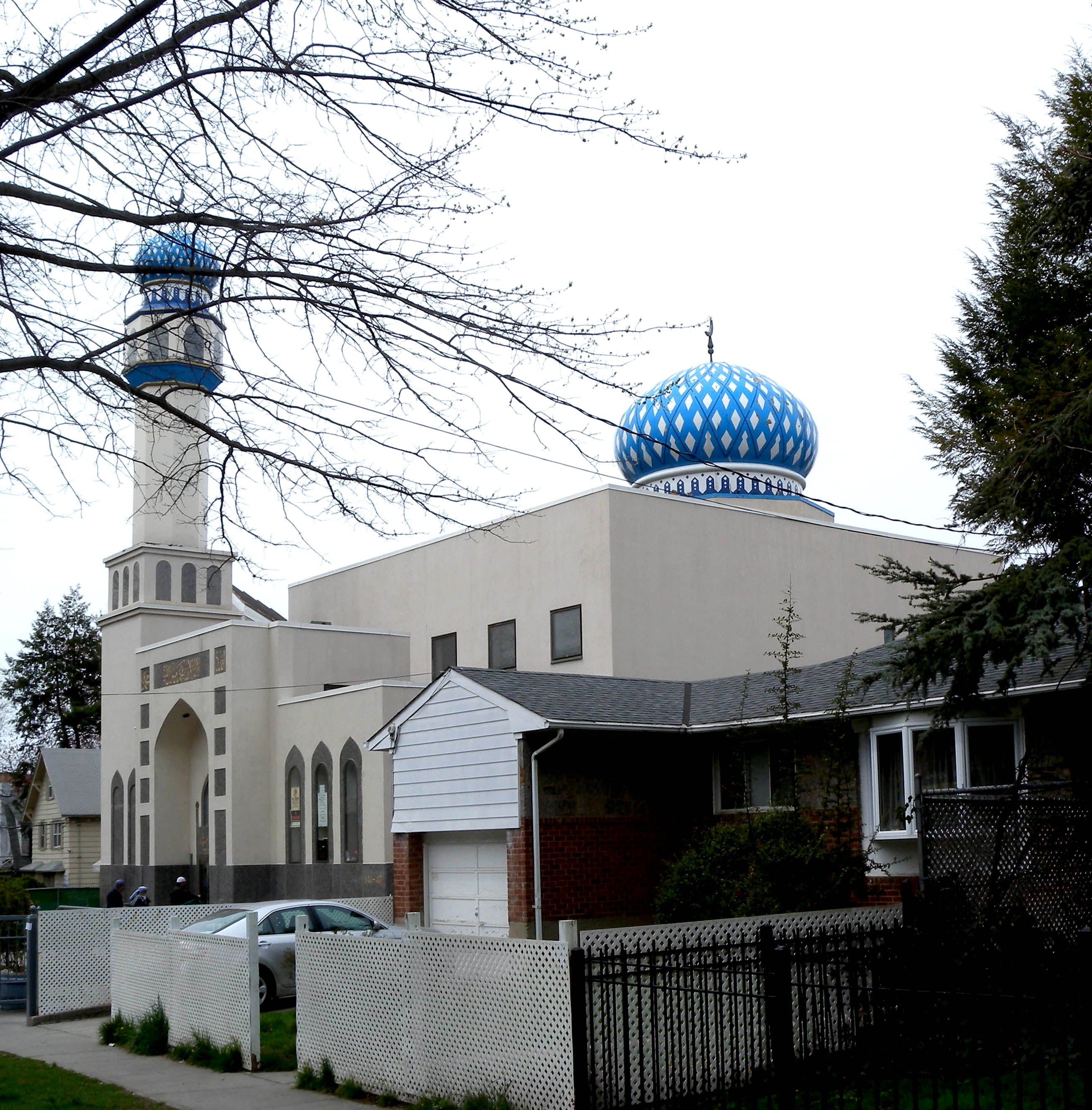
Hazrati Abu Bakr Siddique, a mosque in Queens founded by Afghan, Turkistani, and Uzbek immigrants from Afghanistan, April 2009

Afghan Americans (Dari: آمریکایی‌های افغان‌تبار Amrikāyi-hāye Afghān tabar, Pashto: د امريکا افغانان Da Amrīka Afghanan) are Americans of Afghan descent or Americans who originated from Afghanistan. They form the largest Afghan community in North America with the second being Afghan Canadians. The Afghan Americans may originate from any of the ethnic groups of Afghanistan. They have long been considered by the Board of Immigration Appeals and the United States Census Bureau as White Americans, but a significant number may also identify themselves as Middle Eastern Americans or Asian Americans.

The Afghan community in the United States was minimal until large numbers were admitted as refugees following the December 1979 Soviet invasion of Afghanistan. Others have arrived similarly during and after the latest war in Afghanistan. Afghan Americans reside and work all across the United States. The states of California, Virginia and New York historically had the largest number of Afghan Americans. Thousands may also be found in the states of Arizona, Texas, Georgia, Washington, Oklahoma, Michigan, Idaho, Missouri, North Carolina, and Illinois. As of 2019, their total number is approximately 156,434.

== Uyghur Americans ==
Uyghur Americans are Americans of Uyghur ethnicity. Most Uyghurs immigrated from Xinjiang, China, to the United States from the late 1980s onward, with a significant number arriving after July 2009. The Uyghur American population is small, but growing. Northern Virginia has one of the largest Uyghur populations in the United States. Around 1,500 Uyghurs live in the Washington metropolitan area, with the majority living in Fairfax County, Virginia. A small but notable community of around 150 Uyghurs live in the Boston area.

Uyghurs' history in the United States dates back to the 1960s with the arrival of a small number of immigrants. In the late 20th century, after a series of Xinjiang conflicts, thousands of Uyghurs fled from their homeland of Xinjiang (China) to Kazakhstan, Turkey, Europe, Canada, Australia, New Zealand, and other countries and places. A 2010 estimate put the Uyghur population in the United States at one thousand, however, the Uyghur American Association has said that more have moved to the United States in the 2010s because of the crackdown in China in July 2009. Several thousand Uyghurs are said to be living in the Washington, D.C. area, which has the largest population of Uyghurs in the United States. There are also small populations of Uyghurs in Los Angeles, New York, San Francisco, and Houston.

As for 2019, the Chinese government was reported to routinely carry out harassment and abuse of Uyghurs in the United States in an attempt to control the speech and actions of the estimated 8,905-15,000 persons of Uyghur ethnicity living in the United States. Section 8 of the Uyghur Human Rights Policy Act of 2020 requires a report on "efforts to protect United States citizens and residents, including ethnic Uyghurs and Chinese nationals legally studying or working temporarily in the United States, who have experienced harassment or intimidation within the United States by officials or agents of the Government of the People's Republic of China" to be produced within 90 days.
