= Jóźwik =

Jóźwik is a Polish surname.

Notable people with the surname include:

- Joanna Jóźwik (born 1991), Polish runner
- Marek Jóźwik (born 1947), Polish hurdler
- Urszula Jóźwik (born 1947), Polish sprinter
- Death of Arkadiusz Jóźwik, 2016 crime in England
