= Bruneian Americans =

Total population
- 107 (2020 census)

Languages
- American English • Brunei Malay

Religion
- Islam

Related ethnic groups
- Southeast Asian Americans

Bruneian Americans are Americans whose ethnic origins lie fully or partially in any part of Brunei.

== Population ==
According to the United States Census Bureau, in 2020, there were 107 Bruneians in the United States.

== Notable people ==
- Faiq Bolkiah (born 1998), footballer

== See also ==
- Southeast Asian Americans
