= Death of Arkadiusz Jóźwik =

2016 crime in Harlow, Essex, England

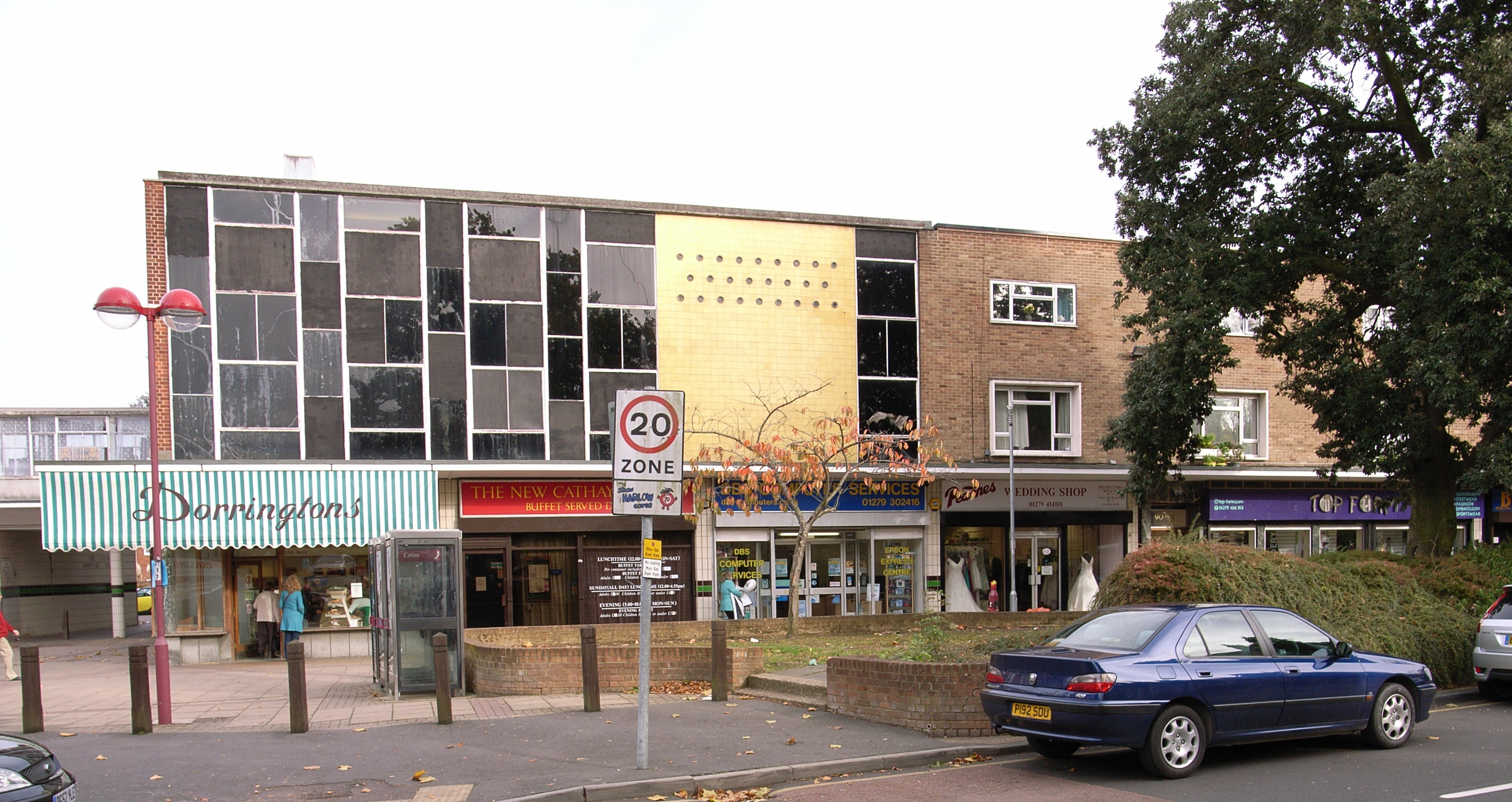
Arkadiusz Jóźwik was fatally punched at The Stow, Harlow (pictured in 2008)

On 27 August 2016, Arkadiusz "Arek" Jóźwik, a 40-year-old Polish immigrant in Harlow, Essex, was punched in the back of the head by a 15-year-old male and died in hospital two days later as a result of injuries caused when he hit the ground. The attacker, who can not be named in the British media due to his age, was found guilty of manslaughter and sentenced to three years' incarceration in a Young Offender Institution.

The attack happened two months after the Brexit referendum and figures in media and politics alleged that the attack was fuelled by xenophobia, which was not found to be the case in a court of law. Some commentators suggested that compared to their interest in the crime when it happened, the media took less interest in the verdict of the trial.

== Attack ==
The attack took place at 11:30 pm at The Stow, a shopping precinct in Harlow. Jóźwik had two friends accompanying him and had been drinking vodka. The prosecution said that unprovoked, the defendant moved around behind Jóźwik to punch him. The defence said that according to prosecution witnesses Jóźwik and his friends were much older and larger than the defendant and his friends, and made racist remarks then "invited violence" from the youths. The judge accepted that the youth did not intend to kill Jóźwik, and that Jóźwik was intoxicated and had approached the youth.

== Reaction ==
The Polish government sent two police officers to Harlow in the aftermath of the attack. EU Commission chief Jean-Claude Juncker said "We Europeans can never accept, never, Polish workers being harassed, beaten up or even murdered in the streets of Essex". Robert Halfon, MP for Harlow, considered Juncker's words to be unreflective of the town: "The vast majority of people are horrified as to the tragedies that have occurred. Harlow residents and the Polish community have rallied together. So what he has said, rather than help the situation has made things much worse".

Initial reports in August 2016 alleged that Jóźwik was killed for speaking Polish. James O'Brien, an LBC radio host, said that UK Independence Party leader Nigel Farage was responsible for Jóźwik's death, saying "Does a politician like Farage talking about people speaking foreign on a train know that this leads inexorably to young people thinking they have the right to object to people speaking foreign in public?". Separately, the BBC interviewed a friend of Jóźwik, who said that Farage had "blood on his hands". After the trial concluded, Farage said that this interview had been damaging to him and his family. The BBC said that it aired interviews suggesting several motives, including anti-social behaviour.

In an article about another crime in April 2017, The New York Times brought up the death of Jóźwik and said he was "repeatedly pummeled and kicked by a group of boys and girls". Harlow-born journalist Jason Cowley wrote that this was inaccurate for several reasons: the group of youths was all male, only one was charged, and he threw only one punch.

There was considerably less media interest in the verdict of the trial, which found that there was no xenophobic motive to the attack on Jóźwik. Brendan O'Neill wrote in The Sunday Times that after Jóźwik died "the media couldn't get enough of this terrible incident. The commentary was ceaseless. The killing trended. But they’ve forgotten it [after the verdict]. And the reason they’ve forgotten it, the reason Jozwik’s name has been all but erased from commentary circles, is pretty awful".

== Legal proceedings ==
Six youths were arrested, and all but one were released because of insufficient evidence. He was charged with manslaughter and his trial began at Chelmsford Youth Court in January 2017. He was found guilty of the manslaughter of Jóźwik and was sentenced to three years in a Young Offender Institution. He was on bail at the time of the attack and had two prior convictions, for possession of a knuckle duster and for threatening behaviour.

== See also ==
- Murder of Shaima Alawadi – 2012 death of Iraqi-American woman that was believed to be a hate crime but was in fact committed by her husband.
- Murder of Khaled Idris Bahray – 2015 death of Eritrean refugee in Germany that was believed to be a hate crime but a fellow Eritrean confessed to.
