= Iraqi Americans =

Ethnic group

Iraqi Americans العراقين الأمريكين
Total population
- 155,055 (2023)

Regions with significant populations
- Michigan · California · Illinois · Massachusetts · Tennessee · Texas · New York · Virginia · Missouri · Pennsylvania · Arizona · Nebraska.

Languages
- Mesopotamian Arabic and American English also Kurdish (Sorani, Feyli and Kurmanji dialects), Turkish (Iraqi Turkmen/Turkoman dialects), Sureth, Mandaic and Armenian

Religion
- Islam (Sunni and Shia) · Christianity (mostly Chaldean Catholic) · Judaism · Mandaeism

Iraqi Americans (Arabic: أمريكيون عراقيون) are American citizens of Iraqi descent. As of 2023, the number of Iraqi Americans is around 155,055, according to the United States Census Bureau.

According to the Bureau of Citizenship and Immigration Services, 49,006 foreign born Iraqis immigrated to the United States between 1989 and 2001 and 25,710 Iraqi-born immigrants were naturalized between 1991 and 2001. However, the 2000 United States census reported that there were approximately 90,000 immigrants born in Iraq residing in the United States.

== History ==
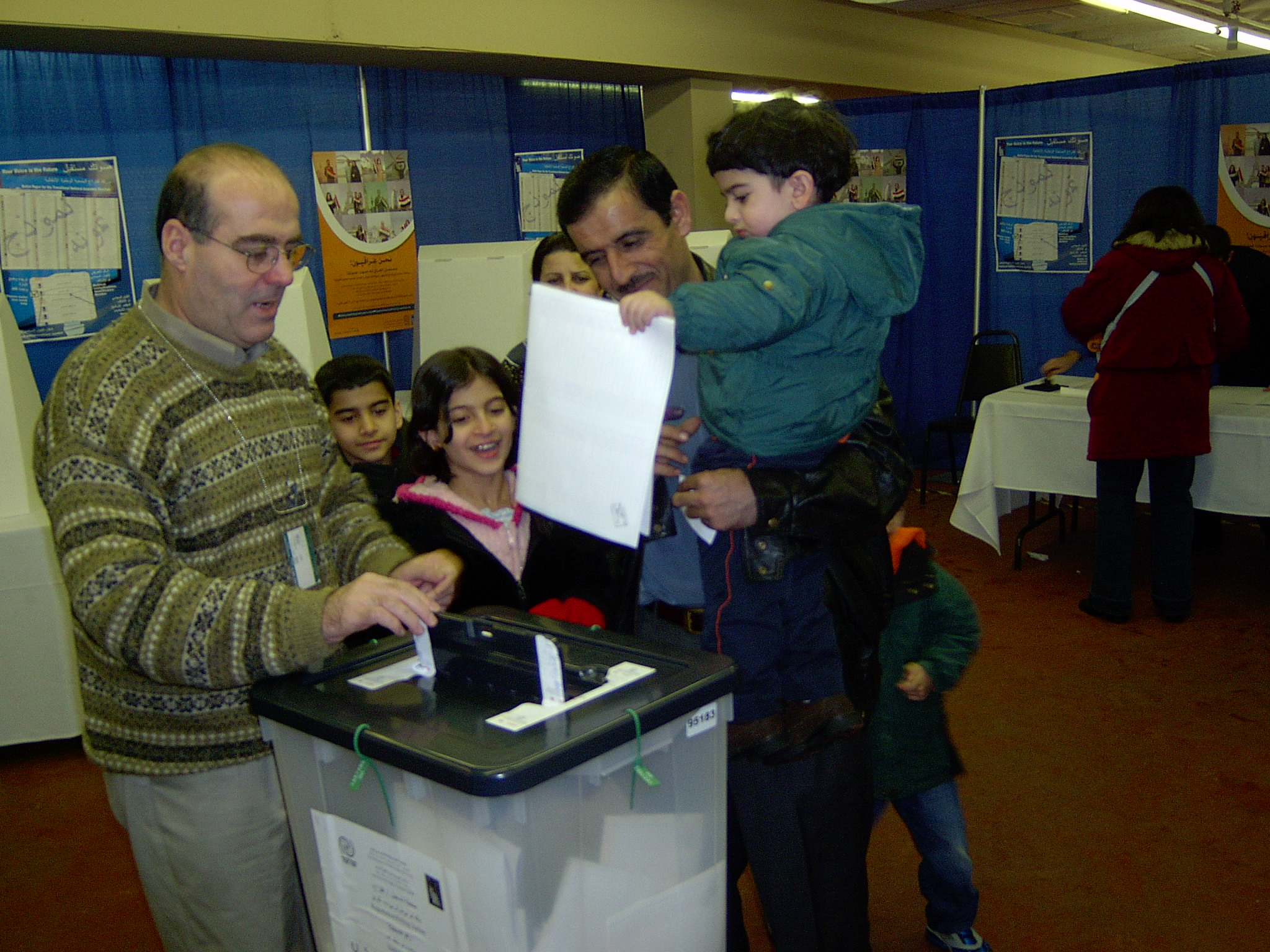
Overseas Iraqis in Maryland voting in the 2005 Iraqi parliamentary election

The term “Iraq” originally appeared in early Arabic writings as a geographical label describing the southern part of what is now modern-day Iraq. Historically, Iraq was referred to as Mesopotamia, which is considered to be one of the oldest regions on the planet where humans were settled in consistently. Researchers have even found remnants of human settlements dating back to 50,000 B.C. Since Iraq is where some of the first civilizations began, it is also one of the first culturally developed areas in the world, which is why it received the title “Cradle of Civilization.”

The Iran–Iraq War, the Gulf War, 13 years of sanctions, and the Iraq War resulted in many more Iraqis of Arab origin and ethnic minorities seeking refuge in the US.

=== Recent migration ===
The United States expedited the process in accepting Iraqi refugees since October 2007, but did not achieve its target of 12,000 such people for fiscal year 2008 as of February 2008. According to the State Department's special coordinator for refugees from Iraq, 375 Iraqis arrived in the United States in January 2008 with refugee status, increasing the total of refugees absorbed since October to 1,432 at the beginning of the fiscal year. Whereas in the fiscal year of 2007, only a total of 3,040 refugees were received. Congress and other non-governmental organizations have criticized the US Administration for dealing with the pending issue of Iraqi refugees in such a slow manner, particularly those whose life is threatened for cooperating with US Forces. They also criticized the issue of the restricted number of Iraqi refugees allowed into the United States. The United States had set a target to receive 500 Iraqis annually who have worked for the US Government through a special visa program. To add to this issue, Congress recently introduced a new law to receive 5,000 Iraqis each year in the United States for having worked for the US Government or in the name of the United States and are facing dangerous threats in Iraq.

Since the US-led invasion of Iraq in 2003, the US has promised to increase the number of Iraqi refugees who will be allowed to settle in the United States from 500 to 7,000. There is a sizable Iraqi refugee population in Memphis, Tennessee.

== Demographics ==
The states with the largest Iraqi foreign born populations are Michigan, California and Illinois. The cities with the largest Iraqi immigrant populations are Detroit, Chicago, San Diego and Phoenix. Nashville has the largest Kurdish population, with much of them emigrating from Iraq. More than one third of Iraqis now living in the United States entered as refugees or were granted refugee status after entering. Iraqi immigrants approximately represent 14 per cent of all immigrants from Western Asia, but compromise less than one per cent of the total foreign-born population in the United States.

=== Chicago ===
The largest and oldest Iraqi community in America is Chicago, home to the largest Assyrian population in the United States, numbering in the tens of thousands. Chicago's first Assyrians, primarily Christian, arrived around the turn of the twentieth century and settled along the northern lakefront, establishing a community church in Lincoln Park. While a majority of the early Assyrians came from Iran, beginning in the 1960s a growing number of Iraqi Assyrians began to migrate to Chicago. In the mid-1970s, nearly 1,000 Iraqi-born Assyrians were resettled in Chicago as refugees from the Lebanese Civil War, and throughout the 1980s and 1990s larger groups of refugees came to escape the Iran-Iraq War and the Gulf War of 1991. The new arrivals have sought residence along the lakefront in Uptown, Edgewater, Rogers Park, and nearby neighborhoods, while a growing number have moved to northern suburbs. Some community leaders have estimated up to 100,000 Assyrians in Illinois as of 2010.

Arabs constitute the second largest group of Iraqi migrants to Chicago. Most of Chicago's estimated 6,500 Iraqi Arabs came to the United States in the late 1970s and early 1980s in search of economic opportunities. Highly educated Muslims, these Arab migrants have entered a range of professional occupations and settled largely in Northbrook and nearby suburbs. After the Persian Gulf War, a new wave of Arabs migrated to Chicago from southern Iraq to escape political persecution. Many of these new arrivals were prisoners of war who were flown to the United States from Saudi Arabia, and a large portion were Muslim Shi‘a who had staged a failed uprising against Saddam Hussein in 1991 and feared reprisal. Arabs were leaders in establishing the Iraqi-American Association, which has a membership of 3,000 predominantly Arab Iraqis and offers assistance to community members.

Kurds and Turkmens constitute small communities in Chicago, both groups are Muslim, but owing to their small size, less than 300 Kurds and 50 Turkmens attend the mosques of other communities. Each group maintains a distinct cultural identity and close ties with brethren outside of Chicago.

=== Outside Chicago ===
Iraqi Americans live across the United States, with other hubs of Iraqis living in the Detroit, New York City, Dallas, Nashville, Philadelphia, Boston, Phoenix and Washington, D.C. areas. Atlanta has developed a large Iraqi community in recent years. Over 20,000 Iraqi Americans reside in California (many tens of thousands live in San Diego and Los Angeles areas) but with the most concentrated in the communities of Modesto, Ceres and Turlock in Stanislaus County in Central Valley, mainly are descendants of agricultural laborers invited to work in the US in the 1920s.

As of 2010 a quarter of Iraqi refugees to the U.S. settled in San Diego County. In 2010, Iraqis made up about one-quarter of El Cajon's population of 96,000, with an estimated 7,000 Iraqis arriving in 2009. The city is believed to have the second-largest number of Iraqis in the country, most of them Assyrians belonging to the Chaldean Catholic Church.

== Religion ==
=== Muslims ===
The Iraqi Muslims who migrated from Iraq are mostly of the Sunni Arabs, 75% and 10% are Sunni Kurds and Sunni Turkmen, most of them emigrated after the invasion of Iraq, and some emigrated starting from the 1930s. As for the Shiites, they are not less than 10%.

=== Christians ===
The Iraqi Christians who migrated from Iraq are mainly Assyrians (also known as Chaldo-Assyrians). They have large populations in Michigan (the majority in Detroit), Illinois, New York, New Jersey and California. Many began migrating to the United States after the Assyrian genocide during World War I. There are also some Iraqi Armenian Christians in the U.S.

Over half of the 64,000 Iraqi Americans in Michigan are Christian.

=== Mandaeans ===
Several thousand Iraqi Mandaeans currently live in the United States. The majority live in Detroit, Michigan with communities in Chicago, Illinois (esp. in a section called Little Iraq); Worcester, Massachusetts; Paterson, New Jersey (Little Ramallah section); Long Island, New York; Houston, Texas; and perhaps in the largest Iraqi-American communities of Los Angeles, California; Orange County, California (Little Arabia in Anaheim, California) and San Diego, California.

=== Jews ===
One of the oldest Iraqi communities in the United States follow Judaism. Jewish residents from Iraq began to emigrate to the American Continent at the turn of the twentieth century. The first known Iraqi Jewish immigrants to the United States arrived between the years 1900–1905. About twenty families immigrated from Baghdad to New York City. World War I (1914–1918), brought more Jewish immigrants from Iraq, in addition to the already existent Iraqi Jewish communities in the United States. Among them were at least sixty young individuals seeking education as well as business people looking for new and better opportunities. The eruption of World War II in 1939, resulted in more than seventy Babylonian Jewish families immigrating to the United States from Iraq. Other Jewish immigrants of Baghdadian ancestry arrived in Southern California from the Far East in the early 1920s. It is estimated that the total Iraqi Jewish population in the US exceeds 15,000 people, with large concentrations in California, New York, Connecticut, Florida, Massachusetts and New Jersey. Smaller known groups of Iraqi Jews, can also be found in Arizona, Colorado, Illinois, Indiana, Maryland, Nevada, North Carolina, Ohio, Pennsylvania and Texas, as well as other States.

The members of the community are driven by ambition to succeed in businesses and as professionals, and this urge has been taking precedence over most other aims in life apart from family cohesion and religious observance during the High Holidays. High education is greatly valued, and almost every school graduate enters College after high school where he or she tends to specialize in a profession. In the early 1990s, a magazine called The Periodical Publication of Congregation Bene Naharayim was published in New York and it reaffirmed the pride of the Iraqi Jews in their ancient heritage, by linking it directly to the glorious traditions of the Babylonian Jewry. Another newsletter for the local Babylonian Jewish community in Los Angeles called "Yosef Haim" began to be published in 1996. It reports on what is taking place in the local Iraqi Jewish community.

== Notable people ==
- Majid Khadduri – Academic, founder of the Paul H. Nitze School of Advanced International Studies Middle East Studies program
- Thomas L. Saaty – Professor, inventor, architect, and theoretician
- Donny George Youkhanna – Archaeologist, anthropologist and author
- Justin Meram – Professional footballer
- Jessica Meir – NASA astronaut, marine biologist, and physiologist.
- John Kassir – American voice actor

== See also ==
- Iraq–United States relations
- Arab Americans
- Assyrian Americans
- Iranian Americans
- Kurdish American
- Mandaean Americans
- Middle Eastern Americans
- Turkish American
- Death of Shaima Alawadi
- History of the Middle Eastern people in Metro Detroit
