= East Asian Americans =

People of East Asian descent in the United States

Regions with significant populations
- Continental United States, smaller populations in Alaska and Hawaii

Languages
- American English; Chinese, Japanese, Korean, Mongolian, Ryukyuan, Tibetan, other East Asian languages

Religion
- Mainly Buddhism, Christianity, Shinto, and Taoism

East Asian Americans are Americans of East Asian ancestry. The term refers to those who can trace back their heritage to East Asia, which includes the countries of China, Japan, Mongolia, North Korea, South Korea, and Taiwan. In the United States census, they are a subcategory of Asian Americans, although individual racial classification is based on self-identification and the categorization is "not an attempt to define race biologically, linguistically, anthropologically, or genetically".

== See also ==
- Asian Americans
  - South Asian Americans
  - Southeast Asian Americans
- Chinese Americans
  - Fuzhounese Americans
  - Hakka Americans
  - Hoklo Americans
  - Hong Kong Americans
- Japanese Americans
- Korean Americans
- Ryukyuan Americans
- Taiwanese Americans
- Tibetan Americans
