= Southeast Asian Americans =

People of Southeast Asian descent in the United States

Regions with significant populations
- Continental United States, smaller populations in Alaska and Hawaii

Languages
- American English; Burmese, Hmong, Iu Mien, Javanese, Khmer, Lao, Indonesian/Malay, Tagalog, Thai, Vietnamese, other Southeast Asian languages

Religion
- Mainly Buddhism, Christianity, Hinduism, and Islam

Southeast Asian Americans are Americans of Southeast Asian ancestry. The term refers to those who can trace back their heritage to Southeast Asia, which includes the countries of Brunei, Cambodia, Indonesia, Laos, Malaysia, Myanmar, Philippines, Singapore, Thailand, Timor-Leste, and Vietnam. In the United States census, they are a subcategory of Asian Americans, although individual racial classification is based on self-identification and the categorization is "not an attempt to define race biologically, anthropologically, or genetically".

== See also ==
- Asian Americans
  - East Asian Americans
  - South Asian Americans
- Bruneian Americans
- Burmese Americans
- Cambodian Americans
- Filipino Americans
- Hmong Americans
- Indonesian Americans
- Iu Mien Americans
- Karen Americans
- Laotian Americans
- Malaysian Americans
- Singaporean Americans
- Thai Americans
- Timorese Americans
- Vietnamese Americans
