= Murder of Shaima Alawadi =

Iraqi-born American woman murdered in California, US in 2012

Shaima Alawadi

Shaima Alawadi was an Iraqi-born American housewife who was murdered in El Cajon, California on March 21, 2012.

Alawadi, a 32-year-old U.S. citizen who had emigrated from Iraq in the early 1990s, was found beaten to death in her home. Alawadi's death was initially seen as a hate crime and that she was murdered for being a Muslim. Alawadi's husband Kassim Alhimidi was eventually charged and convicted for her murder and sentenced to 26 years to life in prison.

== Background ==
Alawadi's family fled Iraq after Saddam Hussein's government suppressed Shiite uprisings, and settled in Detroit in 1993. They moved to San Diego in 1996. Alawadi was a housewife who had five children and volunteered at the local mosque. Her husband and brothers worked for the United States Army training soldiers who were to be deployed to the Middle East.

== Death ==
On March 21, 2012, Alawadi was logged onto Yahoo! Messenger and corresponding with someone in Iraq when she was attacked at her home in El Cajon. Alawadi's 17-year-old daughter Fatima found her unconscious, having been brutally beaten, on the floor of their dining room. Next to her was a note which read "Go back to your country, you terrorist;" the sliding glass door was smashed. A similar note had allegedly been left a week earlier. Although police were not able to immediately determine whether or not the murder was a hate crime, the note led them to consider the possibility. The cause of Alawadi's death was determined to be severe head trauma. Her family took her off life support on March 24, and her body was flown to Iraq for burial.

== Aftermath and investigation ==
Some activists and commentators compared the crime to the killing of Trayvon Martin that had taken place less than a month earlier. The hoodie that Martin was wearing was said to feed into racial profiling that led an armed civilian to shoot the unarmed teenager. Alawadi's hijab was similarly said to have marked her as Muslim to the person who murdered her. The death was initially portrayed in the media as a hate crime due to the note left with the body, and thus an act of Islamophobia.

As the investigation, in which the local police were assisted by the FBI, developed, records were accidentally released to the press which indicated that Alawadi was thinking of filing for divorce from her husband and moving. This and other family issues, including her daughter's refusal to proceed with an arranged marriage, led the police to consider the possibility that the murder was not a hate crime. Due to this information, the death was described as a misogyny hate crime in Time.

Kassim Alhimidi, the 48-year-old husband of Shaima Alawadi, was arrested on the evening of November 8, 2012 and charged in her death, according to San Diego County jail records. Alhimidi was ordered held without bail, and pleaded not guilty to Alawadi's murder. The trial was delayed until March 2014, while defense attorneys looked through evidence. During the trial, the actions of their daughter Fatima, prior to the death of Alawadi, was a focus of some of the testimony. In April 2014, Alhimidi was found guilty of murder, and in June 2014, Alhimidi was sentenced to 26 years to life.
