= Indian Americans =

Americans of Indian descent

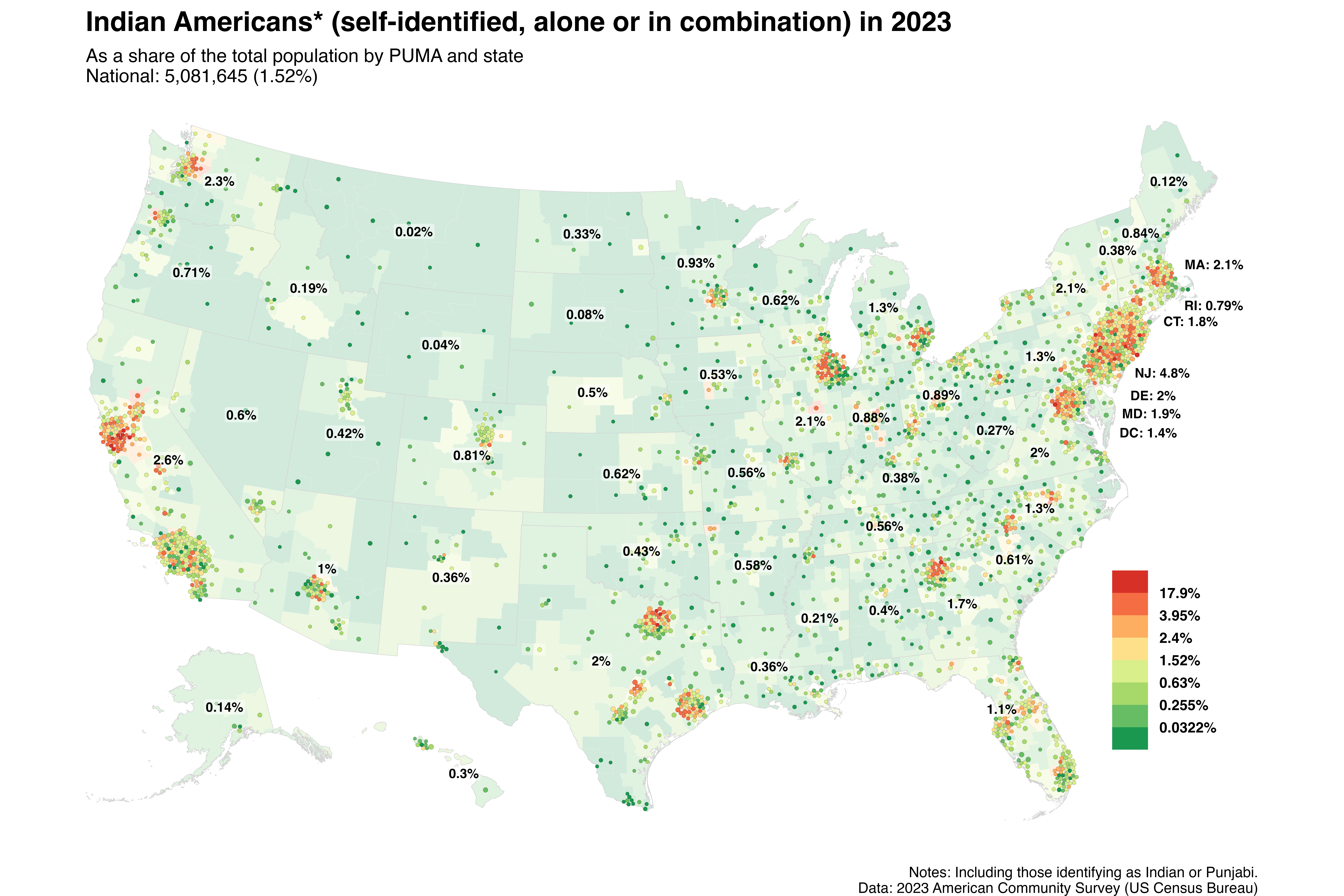

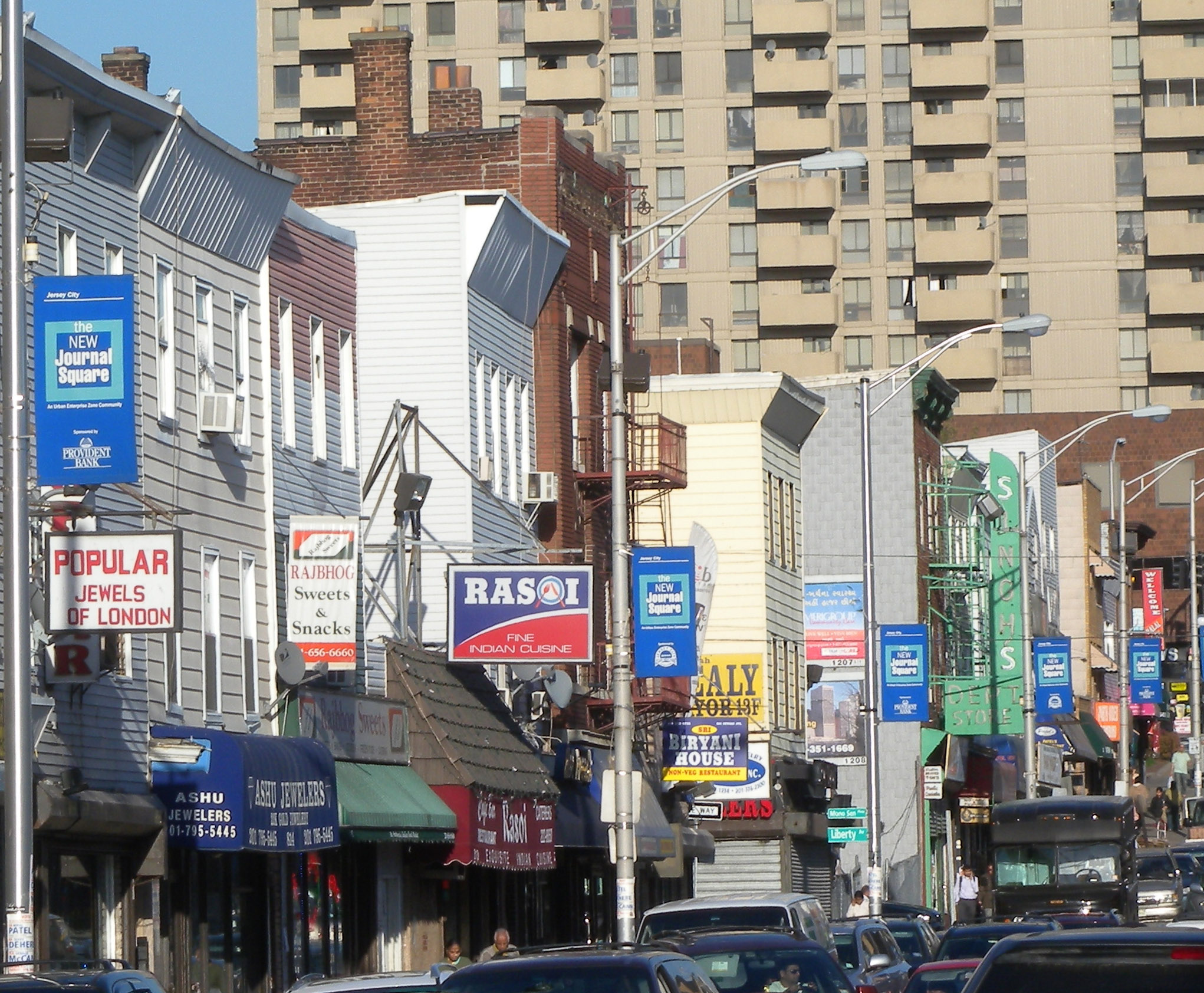
- India Square, in the heart of Jersey City, New Jersey, home to one of the highest concentrations of Asian Indians in the Western Hemisphere, is one of at least 24 Indian-American enclaves characterized as a Little India which have emerged in the New York City Metropolitan Area, with the largest metropolitan Indian population outside Asia, as immigration from India continues into New York City.

Total population
- 5,559,778 (2024: ACS 1-Year Estimates); 1.63% of the U.S. population (2024) (ancestry or ethnic origin); 2,910,042 (2023) (born in India)

Regions with significant populations
- New Jersey • New York metropolitan area • San Francisco Bay Area • Washington–Baltimore combined statistical area • Greater Philadelphia • Greater Boston • Atlanta metropolitan area • Chicago metropolitan area • Cleveland-Akron metropolitan area • Miami metropolitan area • Indianapolis metropolitan area • Milwaukee metropolitan area • Dallas–Fort Worth metroplex • Greater Houston • Research Triangle • Greater Orlando • Phoenix metropolitan area • Metro Detroit • Greater Pittsburgh Region • Greater Los Angeles • Minneapolis–Saint Paul • San Diego County • Charlotte metropolitan area • Denver metropolitan area • Columbus metropolitan area, Ohio • Cincinnati metropolitan area • San Antonio • Tampa Bay area • Greater St. Louis • Las Vegas Valley • Seattle metropolitan area

Languages
- American English; Indian English; Hindi; Urdu; Telugu; Gujarati; Bengali; Tamil; Punjabi; Marathi; Malayalam; Sindhi; Kannada; Kashmiri; Konkani; Assamese; other Indian languages

Religion
- 48% Hinduism; 15% Christianity; 15% no religion 11% other religions (mainly Sikhism and Jainism); 8% Islam (Pew Research Center)

Related ethnic groups
- Indo-Caribbean Americans • Indo-Fijian Americans • Indian people • other South Asian Americans • Indian diaspora • South Asian diaspora • Indian Canadians • Bengali Americans

Indian Americans are Americans whose ancestry originates wholly or partly from India. The terms Asian Indian and East Indian are used to avoid confusion with Native Americans in the United States, who are also referred to as "Indians" or "American Indians". With a population of more than 6 million (6,079,221) according to the Indian Ministry of External Affairs, Indian Americans are the largest group of South Asian Americans, the largest Asian-alone group when excluding multiracial people, and the second-largest group of Asian Americans after Chinese Americans. The United States hosts the largest Indian diaspora by population, though not by percentage.

The Indian American population started increasing after the 1980s, when U.S. migration policies started to attract highly skilled and educated Indian immigrants. Indian Americans have the highest median household income and the second highest per capita income (after Taiwanese Americans) among other ethnic groups working in the United States. "Indian" does not refer to a single ethnic group, but is used as an umbrella term for the various ethnic groups in India.

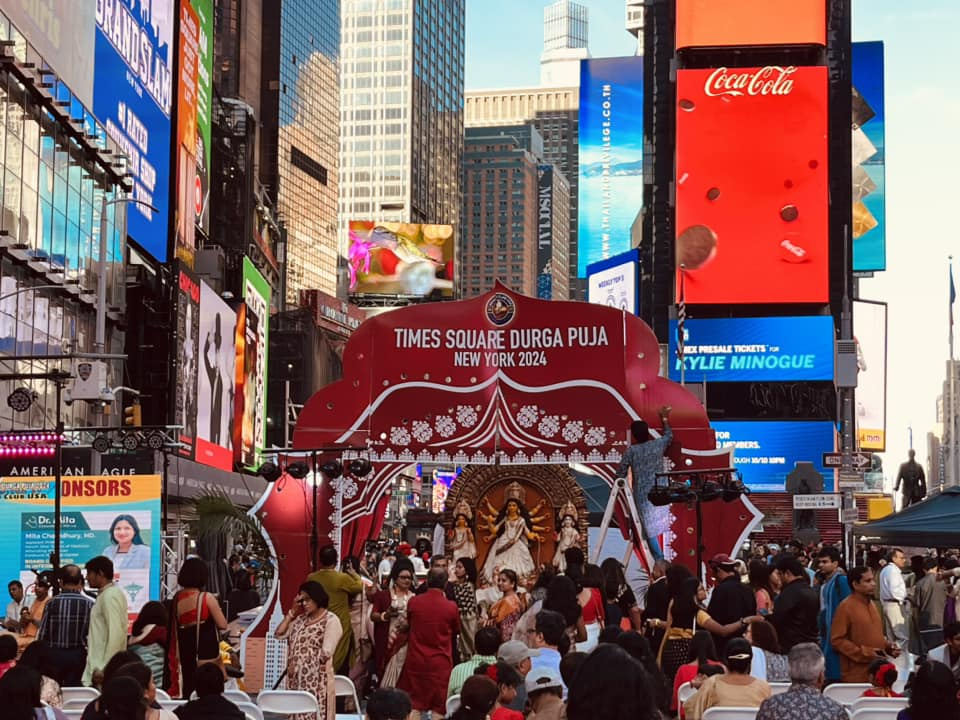
Durga Puja celebrations at Times Square by Bengali Hindu Americans

== Terminology ==
In the Americas, the term "Indians" has historically been used to describe indigenous people since European colonization in the 15th century. Qualifying terms such as "American Indian" and "East Indian" were and remain used in order to avoid ambiguity. The U.S. government has since coined the term "Native American" in reference to the indigenous people of the United States, but terms such as "American Indian" are used among indigenous as well as non-indigenous populations. Since the 1980s, Indian Americans have been categorized as "Asian Indian" (within the broader subgroup of Asian American) by the U.S. Census Bureau.

While "East Indian" remains in use, the terms "Indian" and "South Asian" are often chosen instead for academic and governmental purposes. Indian Americans are included in the census grouping of South Asian Americans, which includes Bangladeshi Americans, Bhutanese Americans, Indo-Caribbean Americans, Maldivian Americans, Nepalese Americans, Pakistani Americans, and Sri Lankan Americans.

== History ==
=== Pre-1800 ===
Beginning in the 17th century, members of the East India Company would bring Indian servants to the American colonies. There were also some East Indian slaves in the United States during the American colonial era. In particular, court records from the 1700s indicate a number of "East Indians" were held as slaves in Maryland and Delaware. Upon freedom, they are said to have blended into the free African American population, considered "mulattoes".

=== 19th century ===
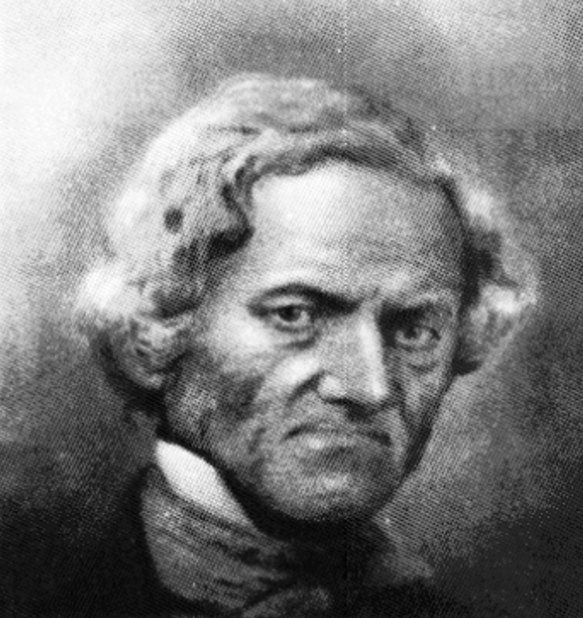
John Pierre Burr, an abolitionist, was the son of Aaron Burr and his East Indian mistress Mary Emmons.

In 1850, the federal census of St. Johns County, Florida, listed a 40-year-old draftsman named John Dick, whose birthplace was listed as "Hindostan", living in city of St. Augustine. His race is listed as white, suggesting he was of British descent.

By 1900, there were more than 2,000 Indian Sikhs living in the United States, primarily in California. At least one scholar has set the level lower, finding a total of 716 Indian immigrants to the U.S. between 1820 and 1900. Emigration from India was driven by difficulties facing Indian farmers, including the challenges posed by the colonial land tenure system for small landowners, and by drought and food shortages, which worsened in the 1890s. At the same time, Canadian steamship companies, acting on behalf of Pacific coast employers, recruited Sikh farmers with economic opportunities in British Columbia.

The presence of Indians in the U.S. also helped develop interest in Eastern religions and influenced American philosophies such as transcendentalism. And Swami Vivekananda's presence at the World's Fair in Chicago in 1893 led to the establishment of the Vedanta Society.

=== 20th century ===
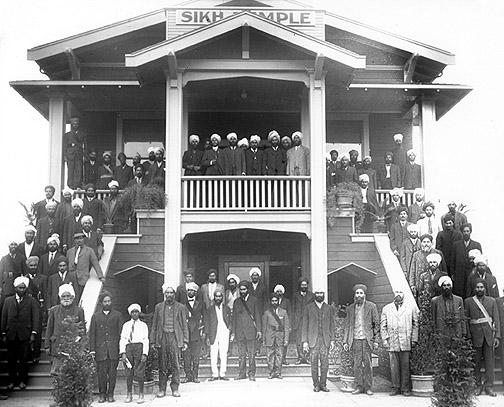
The first Sikh Gurudwara was established in 1912 by the early immigrant Sikh farmers in Stockton, California.

Escaping from racist attacks in Canada, Sikhs migrated to Pacific Coast U.S. states in the 1900s to work in the lumber mills of Bellingham and Everett, Washington. Sikh workers were later concentrated on the railroads and began migrating to California; around 2,000 Indians were employed by the major rail lines such as Southern Pacific Railroad and Western Pacific Railroad between 1907 and 1908. Some white Americans, resentful of economic competition and the arrival of people from different cultures, responded to Sikh immigration with racism and violent attacks. The Bellingham riots in Bellingham, Washington on September 5, 1907, epitomized the low tolerance in the U.S. for Indians and Sikhs, who were called "Hindoos" by locals. While anti-Asian racism was embedded in U.S. Politics and culture in the early 20th century, Indians were also racialized for their anticolonialism, with U.S. officials, who pushed for Western imperial expansion abroad, casting them as a "Hindu" menace. Although labeled Hindu, the majority of Indians were Sikh.

In the early 20th century, a range of state and federal laws restricted Indian immigration and the rights of Indian immigrants in the U.S. Throughout the 1910s, American nativist organizations campaigned to end immigration from India, culminating in the passage of the Asiatic Barred Zone Act in 1917. In 1913, the Alien Land Act of California prevented non-citizens from owning land. However, Asian immigrants got around the system by having Anglo friends or their own U.S. born children legally own the land that they worked on. In some states, anti-miscegenation laws made it illegal for Indian men to marry white women. However, it was legal for "brown" races to mix. Many Indian men, especially Punjabi men, married Hispanic women, and Punjabi-Mexican marriages became a norm in the West.

Bhicaji Balsara became the first known Indian to gain naturalized U.S. citizenship. As a Parsi, he was considered a "pure member of the Persian sect" and therefore a "free white person". In 1910, judge Emile Henry Lacombe of the Southern District of New York gave Balsara citizenship on the hope that the United States attorney would indeed challenge his decision and appeal it to create "an authoritative interpretation" of the law. The U.S. attorney adhered to Lacombe's wishes and took the matter to the Circuit Court of Appeals in 1910. The Circuit Court of Appeals agreed that Parsis are classified as white. On the same grounds, another federal court decision granted citizenship to A. K. Mozumdar. These decisions contrasted with the 1907 declaration by U.S. Attorney General Charles J. Bonaparte: "...under no construction of the law can natives of British India be regarded as white persons." After the Immigration Act of 1917, Indian immigration into the U.S. decreased. Illegal entry through the Mexican border became the way of entering the country for Punjabi immigrants. California's Imperial Valley had a large population of Punjabis who assisted these immigrants and provided support. Immigrants were able to blend in with this relatively homogeneous population. The Ghadar Party, a group in California that campaigned for Indian independence, facilitated illegal crossing of the Mexican border, using funds from this migration "as a means to bolster the party's finances". The Ghadar Party charged different prices for entering the U.S. depending on whether Punjabi immigrants were willing to shave off their beard and cut their hair. It is estimated that between 1920 and 1935, about 1,800 to 2,000 Indian immigrants entered the U.S. illegally.

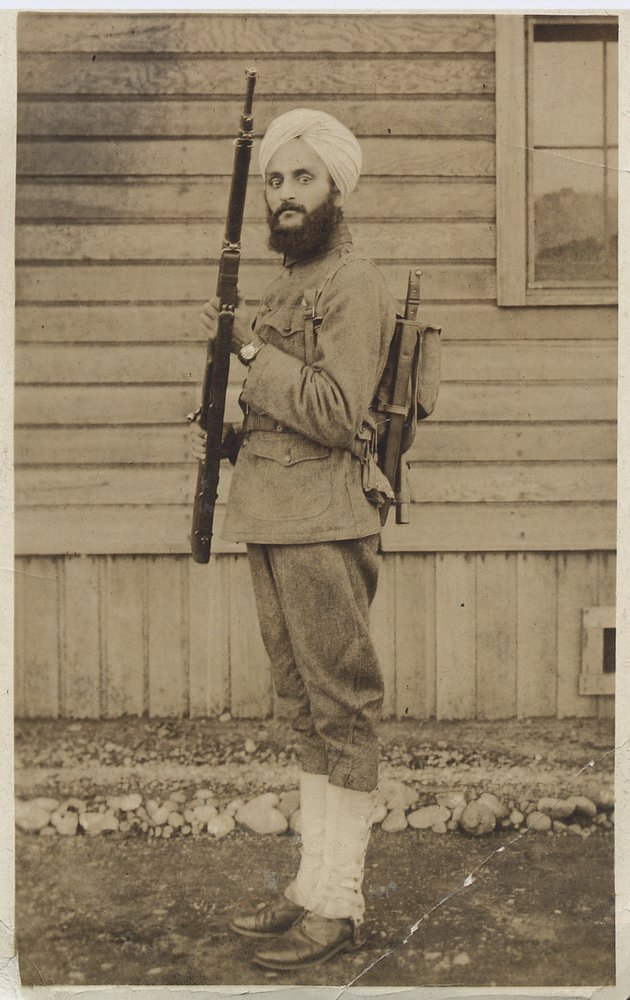
Bhagat Singh Thind was twice denied citizenship as he was not deemed white.

By 1920, the population of Americans of Indian descent was approximately 6,400. In 1923, the Supreme Court of the United States ruled in United States v. Bhagat Singh Thind that Indians were ineligible for citizenship because they were not "free white persons". The court also argued that the "great body of our people" would reject assimilation with Indians. Furthermore, the court ruled that based on popular understanding of race, the term "white person" referred to people of northern or western European ancestry rather than "Caucasians" in the most technical sense. Over fifty Indians had their citizenship revoked after this decision, but Sakharam Ganesh Pandit fought against denaturalization. He was a lawyer and married to a white American, and he regained his citizenship in 1927. However, no other naturalization was permitted after the ruling, which led to about 3,000 Indians leaving the U.S. between 1920 and 1940. Many other Indians had no means of returning to India.

In 1927, Sri Lankan lecturer Chandra Dharma Sena Gooneratne, then frequently erroneously referred to as Indian, delivered several lectures across the country pertaining chiefly to indology—often advocating for Indian independence within them. While in the South, though initially facing racism, effectively circumvented any such discrimination via wearing a turban.

Indians started moving up the social ladder by getting higher education. For example, in 1910, Dhan Gopal Mukerji went to UC Berkeley when he was 20 years old. He was an author of many children's books and won the Newbery Medal in 1928 for his book Gay-Neck: The Story of a Pigeon. However, he committed suicide at the age of 46 while he was suffering from depression. Another student, Yellapragada Subbarow, moved to the U.S. in 1922. He became a biochemist at Harvard University, and he "discovered the function of adenosine triphosphate (ATP) as an energy source in cells, and developed methotrexate for the treatment of cancer." However, being a foreigner, he was refused tenure at Harvard. Gobind Behari Lal, who went to the University of California, Berkeley in 1912, became the science editor of the San Francisco Examiner and was the first Indian American to win the Pulitzer Prize for journalism.

After World War II, U.S. policy re-opened the door to Indian immigration, although slowly at first. The Luce–Celler Act of 1946 permitted a quota of 100 Indians per year to immigrate to the U.S. It also allowed Indian immigrants to naturalize and become citizens of the U.S., effectively reversing the Supreme Court's 1923 ruling in United States v. Bhagat Singh Thind. The Naturalization Act of 1952, also known as the McCarran-Walter Act, repealed the Barred Zone Act of 1917, but limited immigration from the former Barred Zone to a total of 2,000 per year. In 1910, 95% of all Indian Americans lived on the western coast of the United States. In 1920, that proportion decreased to 75%; by 1940, it was 65%, as more Indian Americans moved to the East Coast. In that year, Indian Americans were registered residents in 43 states. The majority of Indian Americans on the west coast were in rural areas, but on the east coast they became residents of urban areas. In the 1940s, the prices of the land increased, and the Bracero Program brought thousands of Mexican guest workers to work on farms, which helped shift second-generation Indian American farmers into "commercial, nonagricultural occupations, from running small shops and grocery stores, to operating taxi services and becoming engineers". In Stockton and Sacramento, a new group of Indian immigrants from the state of Gujarat opened several small hotels. In 1955, 14 of 21 hotels enterprises in San Francisco were operated by Gujarati Hindus. By the 1980s, Indians owned around 15,000 motels, about 28% of all hotels and motels in the U.S.

The Immigration and Nationality Act of 1965 dramatically opened entry to the U.S. to immigrants other than traditional Northern European groups, which would significantly alter the demographic mix in the U.S. Not all Indian Americans came directly from India; some moved to the U.S. via Indian communities in other countries, including the United Kingdom, Canada, South Africa, the former British colonies of East Africa, (namely Kenya, Tanzania, and Uganda, Mauritius), the Asia-Pacific region (Malaysia, Singapore, Australia, and Fiji), and the Caribbean (Guyana, Trinidad and Tobago, Suriname, and Jamaica). From 1965 until the mid-1990s, long-term immigration from India averaged about 40,000 people per year. From 1995 onward, the flow of Indian immigration increased significantly, reaching a high of about 90,000 immigrants in the year 2000.

=== 21st century ===
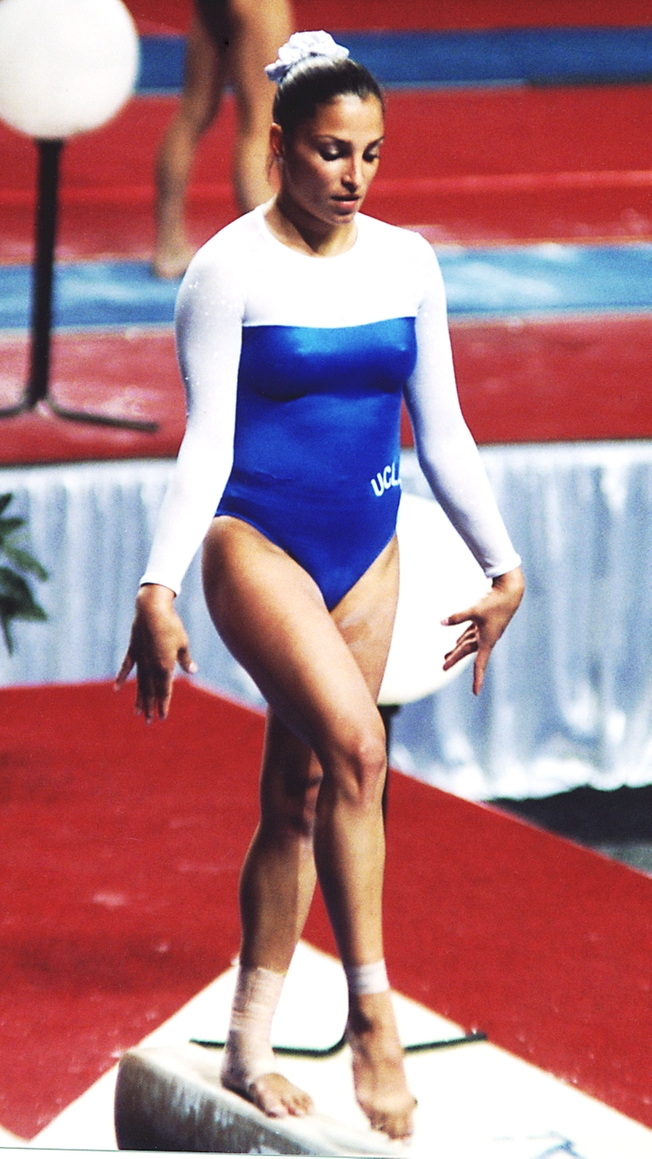
Mohini Bhardwaj, 2004 Summer Olympics medalist in gymnastics

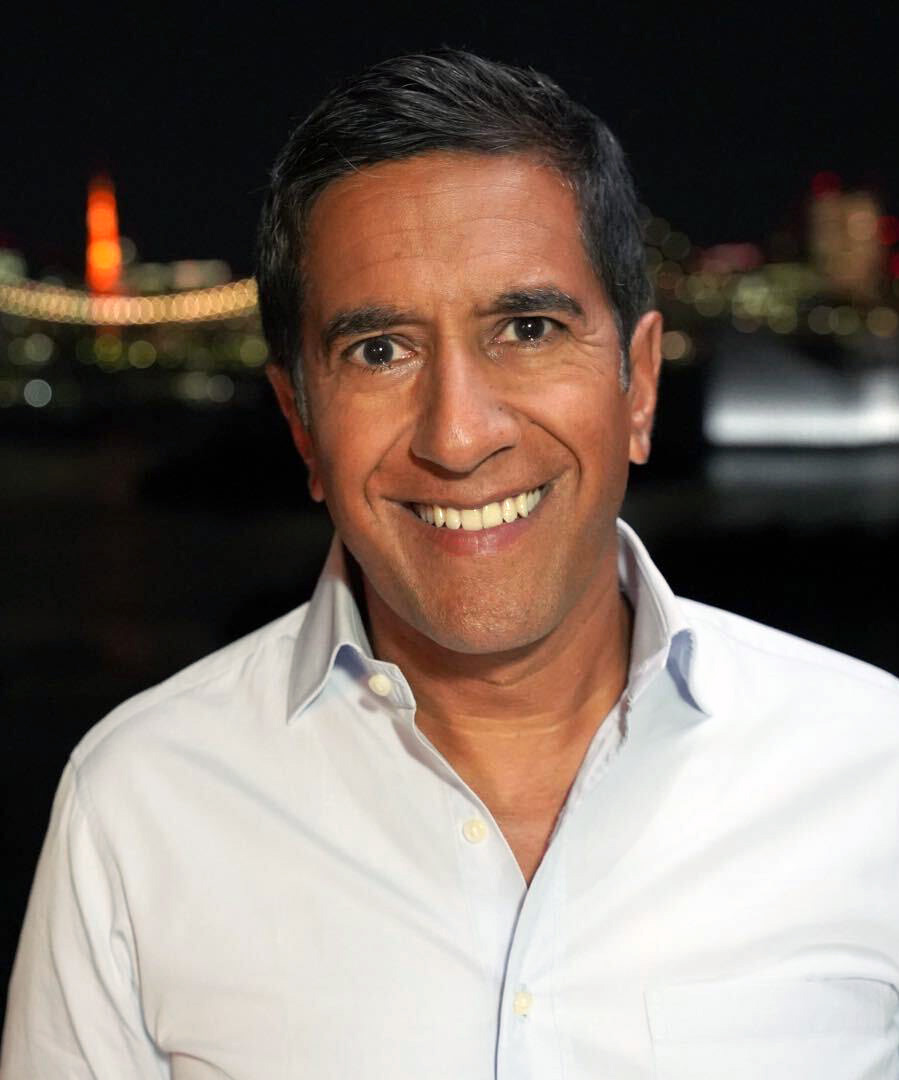
Sanjay Gupta, Chief Medical Correspondent at CNN

The beginning of the 21st century marked a significant wave in the migration trend from India to the United States. The emergence of Information Technology industry in Indian cities as Bangalore, Gurgaon, Chennai, Pune, Mumbai, and Hyderabad led to the large number of migrations to the U.S. primarily from the states of Telangana, Andhra Pradesh, Karnataka, Kerala, and Tamil Nadu in South India. There are sizable populations of people from the states of Punjab, Andhra Pradesh, Maharashtra, Telangana, Gujarat, West Bengal, Karnataka, Kerala, and Tamil Nadu in the United States. Indians comprise over 80% of all H-1B visas. Indian Americans have risen to become the richest ethnicity in America, with an average household income of $126,891, almost twice the U.S. average of $65,316.

Since 2000, a large number of students have started migrating to the United States to pursue higher education. A variety of estimates state that over 500,000 Indian American students attend higher-education institutions in any given year. As per Institute of International Education (IIE) 'Opendoors' report, 202,014 new students from India enrolled in U.S. education institutions. The educational opportunities for students and jobs for highly skilled workers have helped in growth of a skilled and educated Indian immigrant population in recent decades.

In 2017, Kamala Harris became the first Indian American senator in the history of the United States. In 2021, she became the first Indian American vice president. She was elected vice president as the running mate of President Joe Biden in the 2020 presidential election. This was a major milestone in Indian American history, and in addition to Harris, another 20 Indian Americans were nominated to key positions in the administration.

== Demographics ==
Percent of population with Indian ancestry in 2010. New Jersey stands alone demographically, comprising a population over 4% Indian in 2020.

Historical population
Year	Pop.	±%
1910	2,545	—
1920	2,507	−1.5%
1930	3,130	+24.9%
1940	2,405	−23.2%
1980	387,223	+16000.7%
1990	815,447	+110.6%
2000	1,645,510	+101.8%
2010	2,843,391	+72.8%
2020	4,397,737	+54.7%

According to the 2010 United States census, the Asian Indian population in the United States increased from almost 1,678,765 in 2000 (0.6% of U.S. population) to 2,843,391 in 2010 (0.9% of U.S. population), a growth rate of 69.37%, one of the fastest growing ethnic groups in the United States.

The New York-Newark-Bridgeport, NY-NJ-CT-PA Combined Statistical Area, consisting of New York City, Long Island, and adjacent areas within New York, as well as nearby areas within the states of New Jersey (extending to Trenton), Connecticut (extending to Bridgeport), and including Pike County, Pennsylvania, was home to an estimated 711,174 uniracial Indian Americans as of the 2017 American Community Survey by the U.S. Census Bureau, comprising by far the largest Indian American population of any metropolitan area in the U.S.

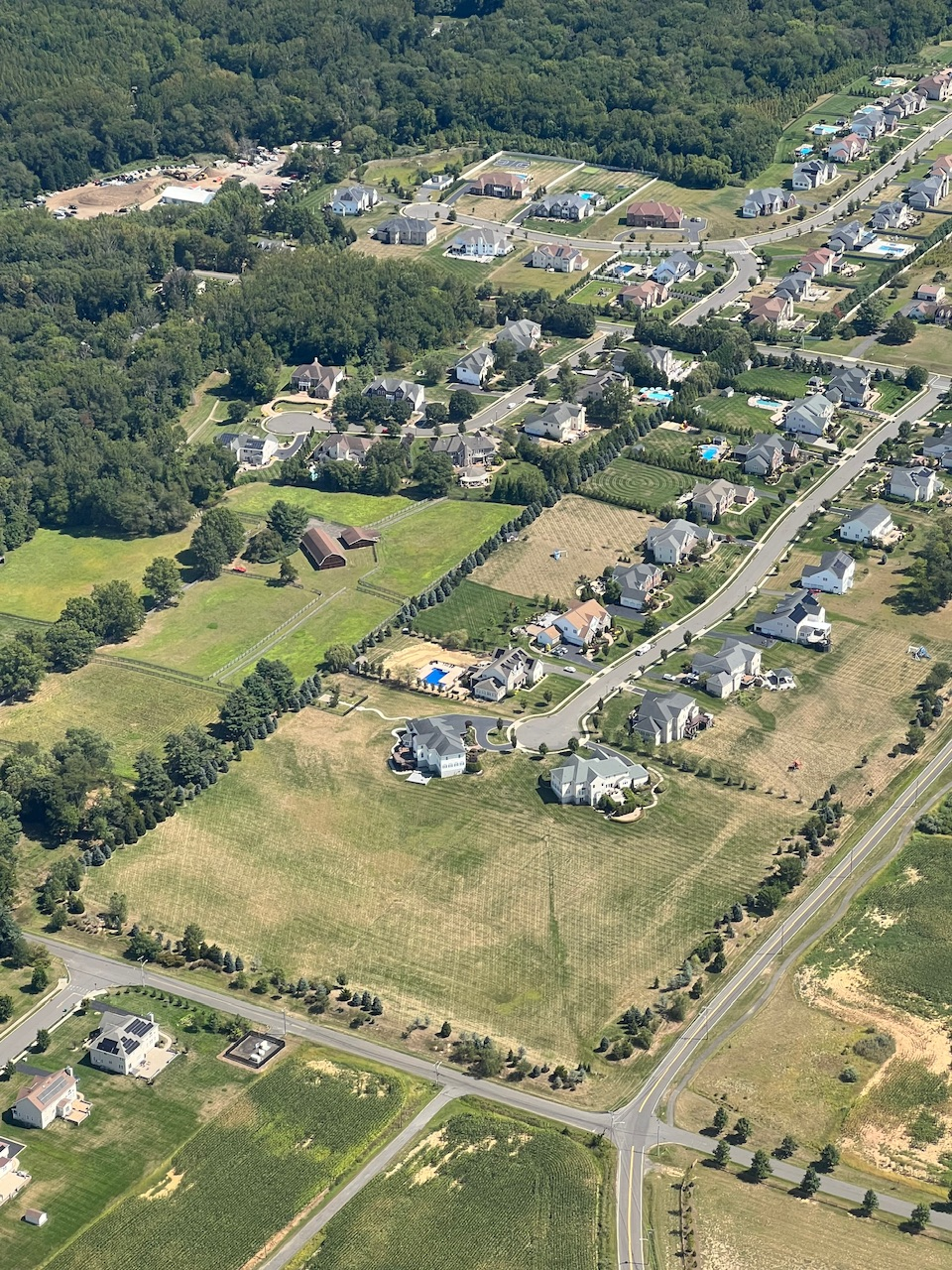
Aerial view of single family homes nestled within natural surroundings of trees and greenbelts in affluent suburban Monroe Township, Middlesex County, New Jersey, while also maintaining the proximity to both New York City and top-ranked Princeton University sought by Indians in this township and the surrounding India corridor of Central New Jersey, with the fastest-growing Indian population in the Western Hemisphere.

New York City itself also contains by far the largest Indian American population of any individual city in North America, estimated at 246,454 as of 2017. Monroe Township, Middlesex County, in central New Jersey, ranked the safest small city in the United States, has displayed one of the fastest growth rates of its Indian population in the Western Hemisphere, increasing from 256 (0.9%) as of the 2000 Census to an estimated 5,943 (13.6%) as of 2017, representing a 2,221.5% increase over that period, and with successive Monroe Township neighborhoods serially converting to Indian-majority. Affluent professionals and senior citizens, a temperate climate with numerous greenbelts, charitable benefactors to COVID relief efforts in India in official coordination with Monroe Township, STEM-heavy schools, Hindu mandirs, the largest indoor statue of the deity Hanuman in the Western Hemisphere, Indian food trucks and language classes, and Bollywood actors with second homes all play into the growth of the Indian population in the township, as well as its relative proximity to top-ranked Princeton University. By 2022, the Indian population surpassed one-third of Monroe Township's population, and the nickname Edison-South had developed, in reference to the Little India stature of both Middlesex County, New Jersey townships. In 2014, 12,350 Indians legally immigrated to the New York-Northern New Jersey-Long Island, NY-NJ-PA core based statistical area; As of February 2022, Indian airline carrier Air India as well as United States airline carrier United Airlines were offering direct flights from the New York City Metropolitan Area to and from Delhi and Mumbai. In May 2019, Delta Air Lines announced non-stop flight service between New York JFK and Mumbai, to begin December 22, 2019. And in November 2021, American Airlines began non-stop flight service between New York JFK and Delhi with IndiGo Air codesharing on this flight. At least 24 Indian American enclaves characterized as a Little India have emerged in the New York City Metropolitan Area.

Other metropolitan areas with large Indian American populations include Atlanta, Austin, Baltimore–Washington, Boston, Chicago, Dallas–Ft. Worth, Detroit, Houston, Los Angeles, Philadelphia, Phoenix, Raleigh, San Francisco–San Jose–Oakland, and Seattle.

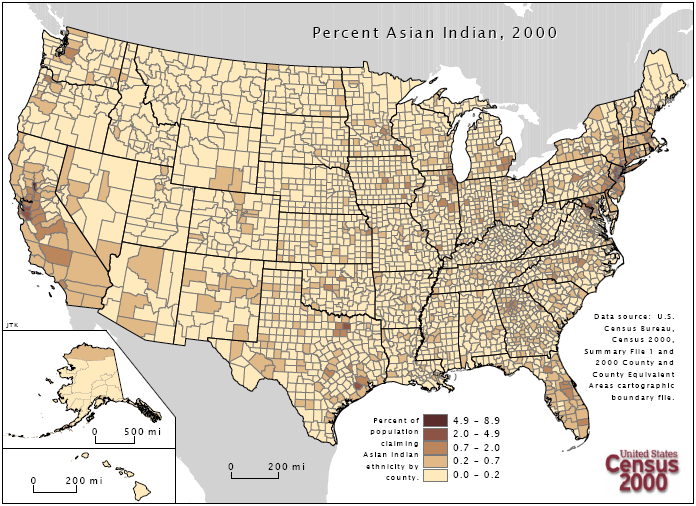

The three oldest Indian American communities going back to around 1910 are in lesser populated agricultural areas in California including Stockton and Yuba City in the Central Valley, as well as in the Imperial Valley. These were all primarily Sikh settlements.

=== U.S. metropolitan areas with significant Asian Indian populations ===
Asian Indian population in Combined Statistical Areas of the United States of America as per Census 2020

Metropolitan Area	Asian Indian Population	Total Population	Percentage
New York-Newark, NY-NJ-CT-PA CSA	792,367	22,431,833	3.53%
San Jose-San Francisco-Oakland, CA CSA	513,349	9,225,160	5.56%
Chicago-Naperville, IL-IN-WI CSA	253,509	9,986,960	2.54%
Washington/Baltimore-Arlington, DC-VA-MD-WV-PA CSA	253,146	10,028,331	2.52%
Dallas-Fort Worth, TX-OK CSA	239,291	8,157,895	2.93%
Los Angeles-Long Beach, CA CSA	231,515	18,644,680	1.24%
Houston-Pasadena, TX CSA	162,343	7,339,672	2.21%
Philadelphia–Reading–Camden, PA-NJ-DE-MD CSA	158,773	7,379,700	2.15%
Atlanta–Athens-Clarke County–Sandy Springs, GA-AL CSA	158,408	6,976,171	2.27%
Boston–Worcester–Providence, MA-RI-NH CSA	152,700	8,349,768	1.83%
Seattle-Tacoma, WA CSA	144,290	4,102,400	2.79%
Detroit–Warren–Ann Arbor, MI CSA	108,440	5,424,742	2.00%
Sacramento–Roseville, CA CSA	76,403	2,680,831	2.85%
Miami–Port St. Lucie–Fort Lauderdale, FL CSA	63,824	6,908,296	0.92%
Austin-Round Rock-San Marcos, TX CSA	63,524	2,352,426	2.70%
Phoenix-Mesa, AZ CSA	61,580	4,899,104	1.26%
Raleigh–Durham–Cary, NC CSA	59,567	2,242,324	2.66%
Orlando–Lakeland–Deltona, FL CSA	54,187	4,197,095	1.29%
San Diego-Carlsbad, CA CSA	50,673	3,276,208	1.55%
Charlotte–Concord, NC-SC CSA	50,115	3,232,206	1.55%
Minneapolis–St. Paul, MN-WI CSA	48,671	4,078,788	1.19%
New Haven–Hartford–Waterbury, CT CSA	45,600	2,659,617	1.71%
Tampa-St. Petersburg-Clearwater, FL MSA	43,690	3,175,275	1.38%
Columbus–Marion–Zanesville, OH CSA	43,461	2,606,479	1.67%
Portland–Vancouver–Salem, OR-WA CSA	35,714	3,280,736	1.09%
Indianapolis–Carmel–Muncie, IN CSA	33,489	2,599,860	1.29%
Denver–Aurora–Greeley, CO CSA	31,452	3,623,560	0.87%
St. Louis–St. Charles–Farmington, MO-IL CSA	28,874	2,924,904	0.99%
Cleveland–Akron–Canton, OH CSA	28,467	3,769,834	0.76%
Fresno–Hanford–Corcoran, CA CSA	25,055	1,317,395	1.90%
Cincinnati–Wilmington, OH-KY-IN CSA	24,434	2,291,815	1.07%
Pittsburgh–Weirton–Steubenville, PA-OH-WV CSA	24,414	2,767,801	0.88%
Kansas City–Overland Park–Kansas City, MO-KS CSA	22,308	2,528,644	0.88%
Richmond, VA MSA	21,077	1,314,434	1.60%
San Antonio–New Braunfels–Kerrville, TX CSA	19,611	2,637,466	0.74%
Milwaukee–Racine–Waukesha, WI CSA	18,779	2,053,232	0.91%
Nashville-Davidson–Murfreesboro, TN CSA	18,296	2,250,282	0.84%
Jacksonville–Kingsland–Palatka, FL-GA CSA	16,853	1,733,937	0.97%
Albany–Schenectady, NY CSA	16,476	1,190,727	1.38%
Las Vegas–Henderson, NV CSA	14,913	2,317,052	0.64%
Buffalo–Cheektowaga–Olean, NY CSA	14,021	1,243,944	1.13%
Salt Lake City–Provo–Orem, UT-ID CSA	13,520	2,705,693	0.50%
Bakersfield, CA MSA	12,771	909,235	1.40%
Harrisburg–York–Lebanon, PA CSA	12,497	1,295,259	0.96%
Greensboro–Winston-Salem–High Point, NC CSA	11,660	1,695,306	0.69%
Allentown–Bethlehem-East Stroudsburg, PA-NJ CSA	11,188	1,030,216	1.09%
Memphis–Clarksdale–Forrest City, TN-MS-AR CSA	10,502	1,389,905	0.76%
Madison–Janesville–Beloit, WI CSA	10,361	910,246	1.14%
Louisville/Jefferson County–Elizabethtown, KY-IN CSA	10,259	1,487,749	0.69%
Oklahoma City–Shawnee, OK CSA	10,237	1,498,149	0.68%
Virginia Beach–Chesapeake, VA-NC CSA	9,985	1,857,542	0.54%
Greenville–Spartanburg–Anderson, SC CSA	9,809	1,511,905	0.65%
Fayetteville-Springdale-Rogers, AR MSA	9,028	546,725	1.65%
Des Moines–West Des Moines–Ames, IA CSA	8,081	890,322	0.91%
Columbia–Sumter–Orangeburg, SC CSA	7,586	1,056,968	0.72%
Rochester–Batavia–Seneca Falls, NY CSA	7,564	1,157,563	0.65%
Dayton–Springfield–Kettering, OH CSA	6,281	1,088,875	0.58%
Omaha–Fremont, NE-IA CSA	6,241	1,004,771	0.62%
Gainesville–Lake City, FL CSA	6,207	408,945	1.52%
Grand Rapids–Wyoming, MI CSA	5,995	1,486,055	0.40%
Tucson–Nogales, AZ CSA	5,977	1,091,102	0.55%
Lansing–East Lansing–Owosso, MI CSA	5,860	541,297	1.08%
Birmingham–Cullman–Talladega, AL CSA	5,714	1,361,033	0.42%
Champaign–Urbana–Danville, IL CSA	5,299	310,260	1.71%
Bloomington–Pontiac, IL CSA	5,225	206,769	2.53%
Lafayette–West Lafayette–Frankfort, IN CSA	5,111	281,594	1.82%
Cape Coral-Fort Myers-Naples CSA	5,042	1,188,319	0.42%
Tulsa–Bartlesville–Muskogee, OK CSA	5,032	1,134,125	0.44%
Knoxville–Morristown–Sevierville, TN CSA	4,793	1,156,861	0.41%
Reno–Carson City–Gardnerville Ranchos, NV-CA CSA	4,761	684,678	0.70%
Albuquerque-Santa Fe-Los Alamos, NM CSA	4,555	1,162,523	0.39%
Springfield–Amherst Town–Northampton, MA CSA	4,398	699,162	0.63%
Scranton—Wilkes-Barre, PA MSA	4,367	567,559	0.77%
Peoria–Canton, IL CSA	4,151	402,391	1.03%
College Station-Bryan, TX MSA	4,149	268,248	1.55%
Urban Honolulu, HI MSA	4,122	1,016,508	0.41%
North Port-Bradenton, FL CSA	4,090	1,054,539	0.39%
New Orleans–Metairie–Slidell, LA-MS CSA	4,048	1,373,453	0.29%
Syracuse–Auburn, NY CSA	4,023	738,305	0.54%
Lexington-Fayette–Richmond–Frankfort, KY CSA	3,758	762,082	0.49%
Tallahassee–Bainbridge, FL-GA CSA	3,705	413,665	0.90%

=== States/territories ===
The following table shows the number of people in each state who identified as "Hindu" in the 1910, 1920, 1930, and 1940 censuses, as well as the number of people identifying as "Asian Indian" in each state from the 1980 census onwards. Between the 1910 and 1940 censuses, "Hindu" was a census category for race, a term which is now associated with religion but then referred to South Asians in general. At the time, the South Asian American population was 85% Sikh, 12% Muslim, and 3% Hindu, but all were nevertheless referred to as Hindus. Midcentury liberalization of immigration law has led to more diverse migration from India, and the proportion of Sikhs amongst Indian Americans has fallen to 8%.

Indian Americans by state or territory
State or territory	1910		1920		1930		1940		1980		1990		2000		2010		2020	
State or territory	Pop.	%	Pop.	%	Pop.	%	Pop.	%	Pop.	%	Pop.	%	Pop.	%	Pop.	%	Pop.	%
Alabama	0	0%	4	0%	3	0%	5	0%	2,374	0.06%	4,348	0.11%	6,686	0.15%	13,036	0.27%	17,174	0.34%
Alaska									230	0.06%	472	0.09%	546	0.09%	1,218	0.17%	857	0.12%
Arizona	0	0%	10	0%	50	0.01%	65	0.01%	2,078	0.08%	5,663	0.15%	14,510	0.28%	36,047	0.56%	64,822	0.91%
Arkansas	0	0%	1	0%	2	0%	2	0%	1,194	0.05%	1,329	0.06%	2,694	0.1%	7,973	0.27%	14,443	0.48%
California	1,948	0.08%	1,723	0.05%	1,873	0.03%	1,476	0.02%	59,774	0.25%	159,973	0.54%	307,105	0.91%	528,176	1.42%	830,259	2.1%
Colorado	1	0%	7	0%	28	0%	8	0%	2,565	0.09%	3,836	0.12%	11,826	0.27%	20,369	0.41%	34,400	0.6%
Connecticut	0	0%	7	0%	3	0%	7	0%	5,426	0.17%	11,755	0.36%	23,905	0.7%	46,415	1.3%	60,634	1.68%
Delaware	0	0%	0	0%	0	0%	0	0%	1,227	0.21%	2,183	0.33%	5,231	0.67%	11,424	1.27%	17,722	1.79%
(Washington, D.C.) District of Columbia	0	0%	6	0%	7	0%	4	0%	873	0.14%	1,601	0.26%	2,415	0.42%	5,214	0.87%	9,149	1.33%
Florida	0	0%	13	0%	4	0%	6	0%	11,039	0.11%	31,457	0.24%	67,790	0.42%	128,735	0.68%	187,236	0.87%
(Georgia (U.S. state)) Georgia	0	0%	5	0%	2	0%	2	0%	4,725	0.09%	13,926	0.21%	44,732	0.55%	96,116	0.99%	165,895	1.55%
Hawaii									708	0.07%	1,015	0.09%	1,244	0.1%	2,201	0.16%	2,362	0.16%
Idaho	0	0%	7	0%	7	0%	4	0%	247	0.03%	473	0.05%	1,142	0.09%	2,152	0.14%	3,398	0.18%
Illinois	1	0%	33	0%	87	0%	41	0%	37,438	0.33%	64,200	0.56%	123,275	0.99%	188,328	1.47%	260,055	2.03%
Indiana	2	0%	1	0%	14	0%	5	0%	4,746	0.09%	7,095	0.13%	14,159	0.23%	27,598	0.43%	47,902	0.71%
Iowa	3	0%	3	0%	6	0%	0	0%	2,424	0.08%	3,021	0.11%	5,407	0.18%	11,081	0.36%	14,748	0.46%
Kansas	0	0%	2	0%	9	0%	7	0%	2,588	0.11%	3,956	0.16%	7,681	0.29%	13,848	0.49%	19,832	0.68%
Kentucky	0	0%	1	0%	1	0%	3	0%	2,669	0.07%	2,922	0.08%	6,734	0.17%	12,501	0.29%	18,154	0.4%
Louisiana	26	0%	27	0%	28	0%	15	0%	3,036	0.07%	5,083	0.12%	8,641	0.19%	11,174	0.25%	12,964	0.28%
Maine	0	0%	2	0%	0	0%	1	0%	475	0.04%	607	0.05%	978	0.08%	1,959	0.15%	2,276	0.17%
Maryland	0	0%	6	0%	6	0%	10	0%	13,788	0.33%	28,330	0.59%	49,766	0.94%	79,051	1.37%	104,617	1.69%
Massachusetts	14	0%	8	0%	42	0%	20	0%	8,943	0.16%	19,719	0.33%	41,935	0.66%	77,177	1.18%	125,534	1.79%
Michigan	0	0%	38	0%	181	0%	113	0%	15,363	0.17%	23,845	0.26%	54,464	0.55%	77,132	0.78%	122,245	1.21%
Minnesota	0	0%	4	0%	3	0%	3	0%	3,734	0.09%	8,234	0%	16,278	0.33%	33,031	0.62%	47,173	0.83%
Mississippi	0	0%	0	0%	0	0%	1	0%	1,313	0.05%	1,872	0.07%	3,325	0.12%	5,494	0.19%	6,807	0.23%
Missouri	2	0%	15	0%	9	0%	6	0%	4,276	0.09%	6,111	0.12%	11,845	0.21%	23,223	0.39%	34,748	0.56%
Montana	0	0%	1	0%	4	0%	7	0%	154	0.02%	248	0.03%	450	0.05%	618	0.06%	726	0.07%
Nebraska	0	0%	1	0%	1	0%	2	0%	1,106	0.07%	1,218	0.08%	3,199	0.19%	5,903	0.32%	9,107	0.46%
Nevada	52	0.06%	3	0%	12	0.01%	3	0%	527	0.07%	1,825	0.15%	4,860	0.24%	11,671	0.43%	14,005	0.45%
New Hampshire	0	0%	0	0%	1	0%	0	0%	742	0.08%	1,697	0.15%	3,579	0.29%	8,268	0.63%	10,659	0.77%
New Jersey	0	0%	34	0%	110	0%	47	0%	30,684	0.42%	79,440	1.03%	169,209	2.01%	292,256	3.32%	415,342	4.47%
New Mexico	0	0%	0	0%	20	0%	19	0%	622	0.05%	1,593	0.11%	2,424	0.13%	4,550	0.22%	5,807	0.27%
(New York (state)) New York	14	0%	204	0%	320	0%	243	0%	67,636	0.39%	140,985	0.78%	250,027	1.32%	313,620	1.62%	387,376	1.92%
North Carolina	0	0%	1	0%	0	0%	7	0%	4,855	0.08%	9,847	0.15%	25,350	0.31%	57,400	0.6%	121,974	1.17%
North Dakota	0	0%	1	0%	0	0%	0	0%	252	0.04%	482	0.08%	1,042	0.16%	1,543	0.23%	1,732	0.22%
Ohio	0	0%	35	0%	55	0%	40	0%	13,602	0.13%	20,848	0.19%	37,624	0.33%	64,187	0.56%	99,105	0.84%
Oklahoma	0	0%	1	0%	4	0%	17	0%	3,168	0.1%	4,546	0.14%	8,302	0.24%	11,906	0.32%	14,631	0.37%
Oregon	305	0.05%	90	0.01%	35	0%	21	0%	2,265	0.09%	3,508	0.12%	10,188	0.3%	16,740	0.44%	29,028	0.69%
Pennsylvania	2	0%	47	0%	63	0%	52	0%	17,230	0.15%	28,396	0.24%	56,233	0.46%	103,026	0.81%	157,626	1.21%
Puerto Rico										0%		0%	5,564	0.15%	3,523	0.09%	947	0.03%
Rhode Island	0	0%	6	0%	1	0%	4	0%	904	0.1%	1,975	0.2%	2,548	0.24%	4,653	0.44%	7,334	0.67%
South Carolina	0	0%	11	0%	2	0%	2	0%	2,572	0.08%	3,900	0.11%	8,215	0.2%	15,941	0.34%	26,875	0.53%
South Dakota	0	0%	2	0%	1	0%	1	0%	157	0.02%	287	0.04%	581	0.08%	1,152	0.14%	1,523	0.17%
Tennessee	1	0%	13	0%	4	0%	2	0%	3,392	0.07%	5,911	0.12%	11,956	0.21%	23,900	0.38%	40,151	0.58%
Texas	2	0%	4	0%	49	0%	73	0%	23,395	0.16%	55,795	0.33%	127,256	0.61%	245,981	0.98%	480,566	1.65%
Utah	0	0%	28	0.01%	25	0%	13	0%	932	0.06%	1,557	0.09%	3,157	0.14%	6,212	0.22%	11,908	0.36%
Vermont	0	0%	0	0%	0	0%	0	0%	520	0.1%	529	0.09%	697	0.11%	1,359	0.22%	1,794	0.28%
Virginia	0	0%	6	0%	0	0%	8	0%	9,046	0.17%	20,494	0.33%	47,578	0.67%	103,916	1.3%	157,635	1.83%
(Washington (state)) Washington	161	0.01%	85	0.01%	53	0%	23	0%	4,267	0.1%	8,205	0.17%	22,489	0.38%	61,124	0.91%	140,817	1.83%
West Virginia	0	0%	0	0%	1	0%	11	0%	1,936	0.1%	1,981	0.11%	2,529	0.14%	3,304	0.18%	3,289	0.18%
Wisconsin	0	0%	2	0%	2	0%	5	0%	3,902	0.08%	6,914	0.14%	11,280	0.21%	22,899	0.4%	32,831	0.56%
Wyoming	11	0.01%	7	0%	2	0%	0	0%	104	0.02%	240	0.05%	423	0.09%	589	0.1%	522	0.09%
United States	2,545	0%	2,507	0%	3,130	0%	2,405	0%	387,223	0.17%	815,447	0.33%	1,645,510	0.58%	2,843,391	0.92%	4,397,737	1.33%

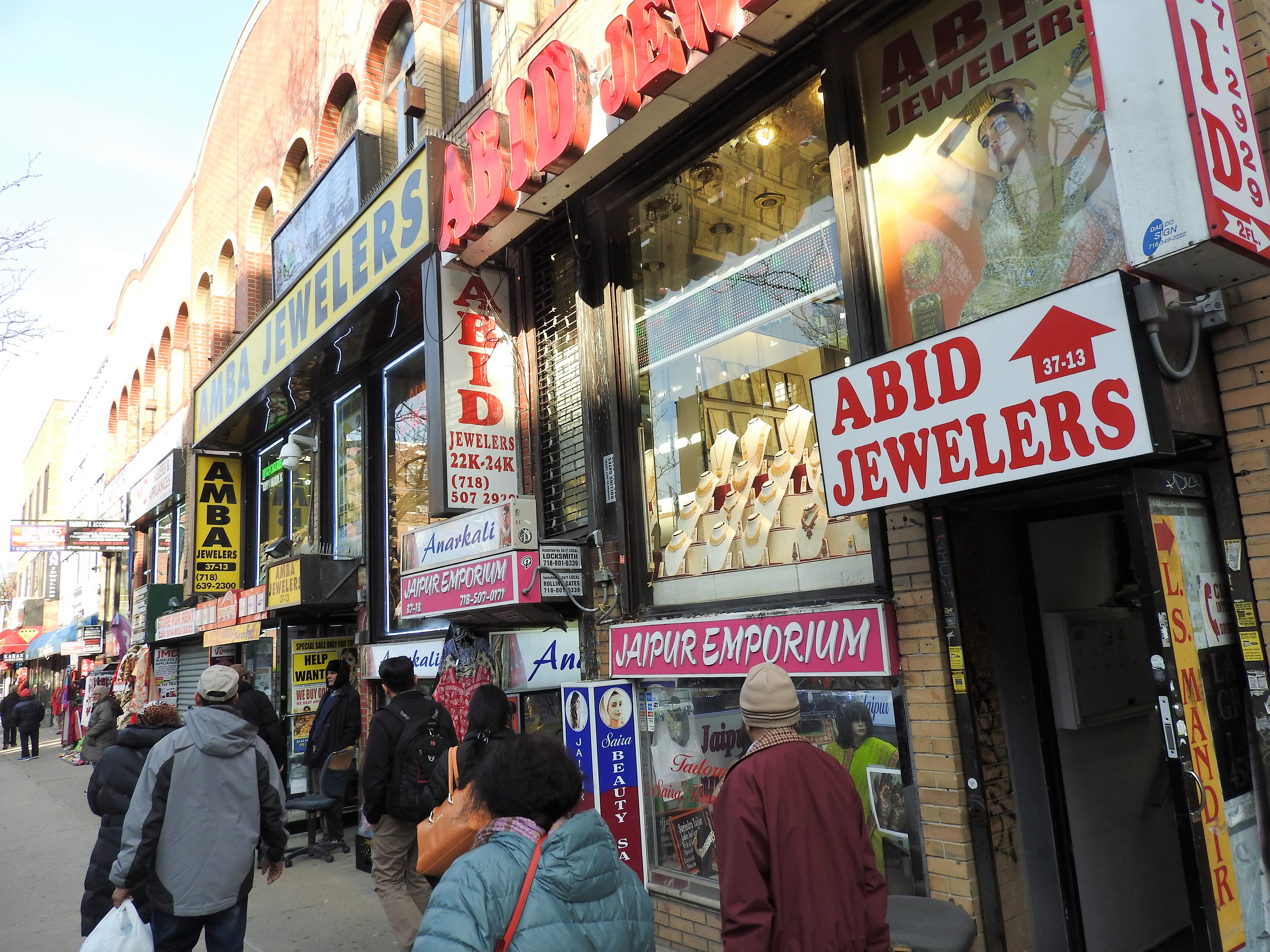
Little India on 74th Street in Jackson Heights, Queens

=== Languages ===
Ethnolinguistic composition of the Indian diaspora in US (2017 est.)
1. Hindustani (46.0%)
2. Telugu (13.0%)
3. Punjabi (10.0%)
4. Tamil (9.00%)
5. Gujarati (8.00%)
6. Marathi (5.00%)
7. Malayalam (4.00%)
8. Bengali (3.00%)
9. Kannada (2.00%)

Since the 1990s dot-com boom, there has been a shift in the Indian American population from being dominated by immigrants from Gujarat and Punjab to being increasingly represented more broadly, including by immigrants from Andhra Pradesh and Telangana, West Bengal, Tamil Nadu, Kerala, Karnataka, and Maharashtra. Between 2010 and 2021, Telugu rose from being the sixth- most spoken South Asian language to being the third-most spoken, while Punjabi fell from being the fourth-most spoken South Asian language in the United States to become the seventh-most spoken. There are significant differences between these groups in terms of socioeconomic factors like education, geographic location, and income; in 2021, 81% of Americans speaking Telugu at home spoke English very well, while only 59% of Americans speaking Punjabi at home did the same.

Number of Americans speaking South Asian languages at home (2010–2021)
South Asian language	2010	2021	Change	% Change
Hindi	609,395	864,830	255,435	41.92%
Urdu	388,909	507,972	119,063	30.61%
Punjabi	243,773	318,588	74,815	30.69%
Bengali	221,872	403,024	181,152	81.65%
Telugu	217,641	459,836	242,195	111.28%
Tamil	181,698	341,396	159,698	87.89%
Nepali, Marathi, and other Indo-Aryan languages	275,694	447,811	172,117	62.43%
Malayalam, Kannada, and other Dravidian languages	197,550	280,188	82,638	41.83%
Gujarati	356,394	436,909	80,515	22.59%

=== Socioeconomic status ===
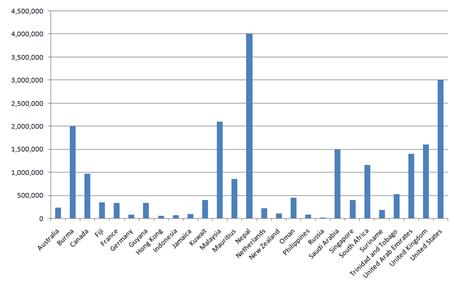
The United States is host to the second-largest Indian diaspora, following Nepal.

From the 1990 census to the 2000 census, the Asian Indian population increased by 105.87%. Meanwhile, the U.S. population increased by only 7.6%. In 2000, the Indian-born population in the U.S. was 1.007 million. In 2006, of the 1,266,264 legal immigrants to the United States, 58,072 were from India. Between 2000 and 2006, 421,006 Indian immigrants were admitted to the U.S., up from 352,278 during the 1990–1999 period. At 16.4% of the Asian-American population, Indian Americans make up the third largest Asian-American ethnic group, following Chinese Americans and Filipino Americans.

A joint Duke University-UC Berkeley study revealed that Indian immigrants have founded more engineering and technology companies from 1995 to 2005 than immigrants from the United Kingdom, China, Taiwan, and Japan combined. The percentage of Silicon Valley startups founded by Indian immigrants has increased from 7% in 1999 to 15.5% in 2006, as reported in the 1999 study by AnnaLee Saxenian and her updated work in 2006 in collaboration with Vivek Wadhwa. Indian Americans have risen to top positions at many major companies (e.g., IBM, PepsiCo, MasterCard, Google, Facebook, Microsoft, Cisco, Oracle, Adobe, Softbank, Cognizant, Sun Microsystems.) A 2014 study indicates that 23% of Indian business school graduates take a job in the United States.

Year	Asian Indians (per ACS)
2005	2,319,222
2006	2,482,141
2007	2,570,166
2008	2,495,998
2009	2,602,676
2010	2,765,155
2011	2,908,204
2012	3,049,201
2013	3,189,485
2014	3,491,052
2015	3,510,000
2016	3,613,407
2017	3,794,539
2018	3,882,526
2019	4,002,151
2020	4,021,134

Indian Americans continually outpace every other ethnic group socioeconomically per U.S. census statistics. Thomas Friedman of The New York Times, in his 2005 book The World Is Flat, explains this trend in terms of brain drain, whereby a sample of the best and brightest people in India emigrate to the United States in order to seek better financial opportunities. Indians form the second largest group of physicians after non-Hispanic Caucasian Americans (3.9%) as of the 1990 survey, and the share of Indian physicians rose to approximately 6% in 2005.

=== Education ===
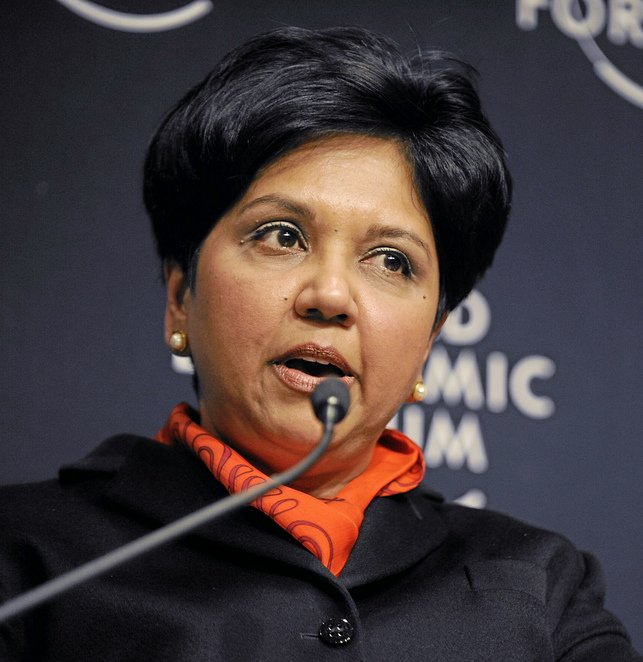
Indra Nooyi, former CEO of PepsiCo. Many people of Indian descent have risen to prominent positions in some of the biggest companies of the world.

According to Pew Research in 2015, of Indian Americans aged 25 and older, 72% had obtained a bachelor's degree and 40% had obtained a postgraduate degree, whereas of all Americans, 19% had obtained a bachelor's degree and 11% had obtained a postgraduate degree.

=== Income ===
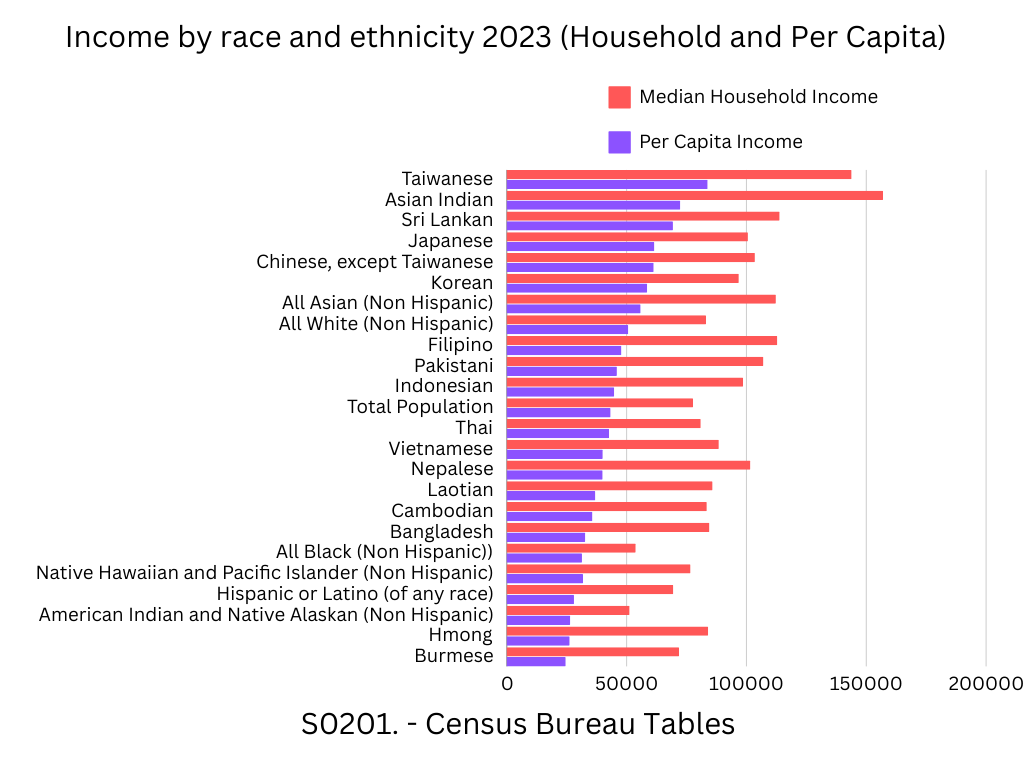
Income by race and ethnicity 2023 and Asian American groups (Household and Per Capita) Shows income data for Indian Americans

The median household income for Indian immigrants in 2019 was much higher than that of the overall foreign- and native-born populations. Indians overall have much higher incomes than the total foreign and native-born populations.

In a 2019 survey, it was found that households headed by an Indian immigrant had a median income of $132,000, compared to $64,000 and $66,000 for all immigrant and U.S.-born households, respectively. Indian immigrants were also much less likely to be in poverty (5%) than immigrants overall (14%) or the U.S. born (12%).

According to 2020 US census data, the median Indian American household income had risen to $157,005.

Indian Americans had the second-highest per capita incomes among Asian Americans of $72,389 which was second only to Taiwanese Americans, who tend to have smaller households than Indian Americans.

75.1% of Indian Americans worked in management, business, science, and arts occupations, this is compared to only 43.2% for the total population.

=== Religion ===
Religious Makeup of Indian Americans (2023)
1. Hindu (48.0%)
2. Christian (15.0%)
3. Muslim (8.00%)
4. Sikh (8.00%)
5. Other religion (3.00%)
6. No religion (18.0%)
Indian religions in US

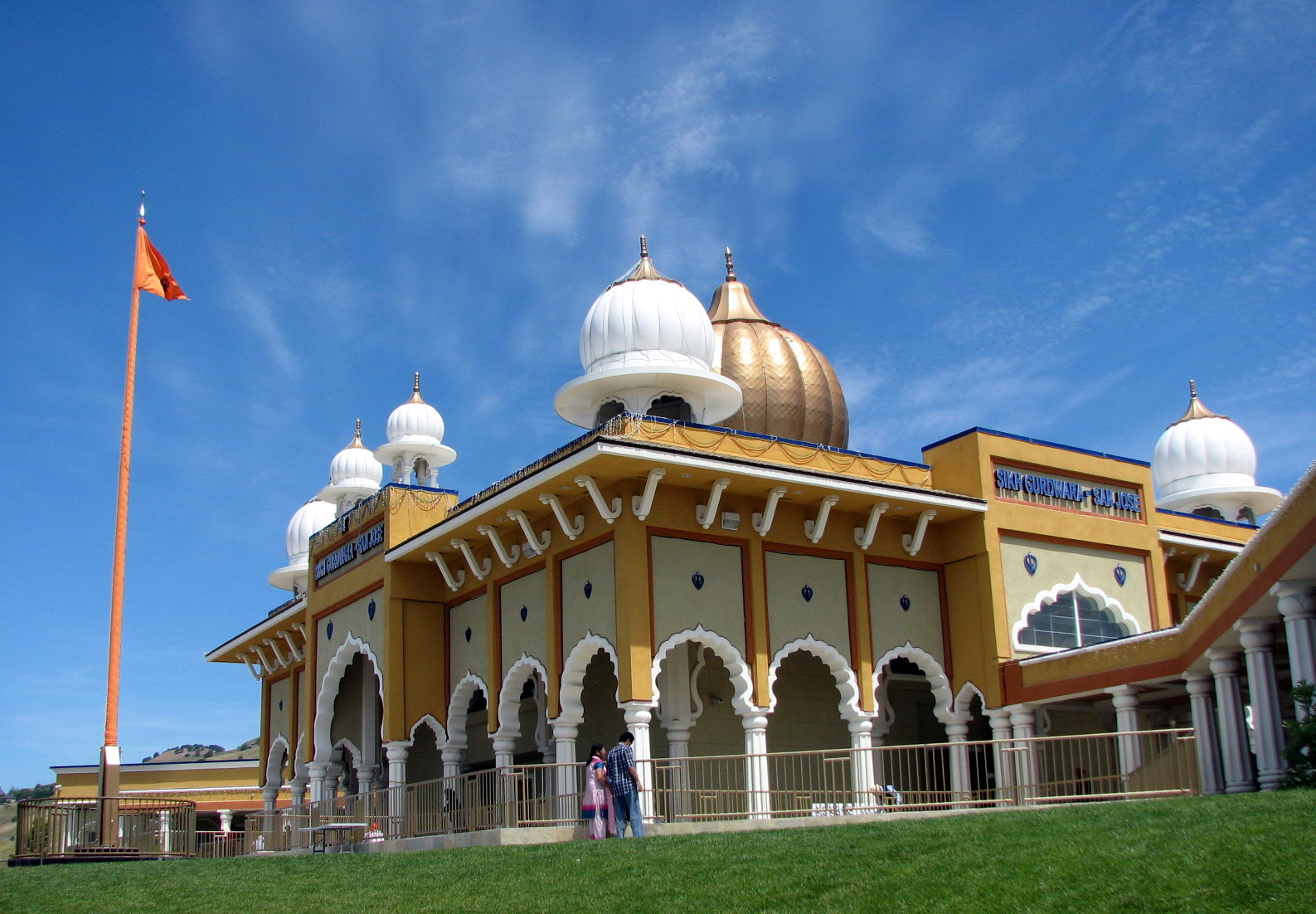
Gurdwara Sahib of San Jose, the largest Gurudwara in North America.

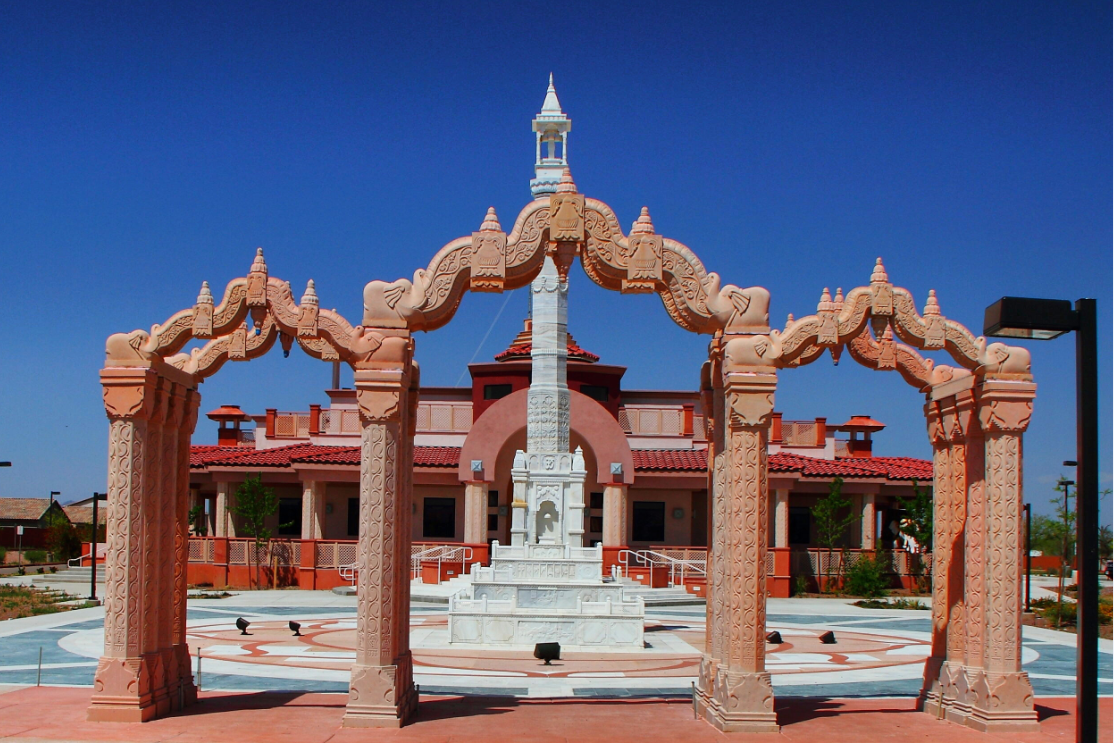
Jain Center of Greater Phoenix (JCGP)

Communities of Hindus, Christians, Muslims, Sikhs, irreligious people, and smaller numbers of Jains, Buddhists, Zoroastrians, and Indian Jews, have established their religious (or irreligious) beliefs in the United States. According to 2023 Pew Research Center research, 48% consider themselves Hindu, 15% as Christian (7% Catholic, 4% Evangelical Protestant, 4% Nonevangelical Protestant), 18% as unaffiliated, 8% as Muslims, 8% as Sikh, and 3% as a member of another religion. The first religious center of an Indian religion to be established in the U.S. was a Sikh Gurudwara in Stockton, California in 1912.

==== Hindus ====
As of 2008, the American Hindu population was around 2.2 million. Hindus form the plurality religious group among the Indian American community. Many organizations such as ISKCON, Swaminarayan Sampradaya, BAPS Swaminarayan Sanstha, Chinmaya Mission, and Swadhyay Pariwar are well-established in the U.S. and Hindu Americans have formed the Hindu American Foundation which represents American Hindus and aim to educate people about Hinduism. Swami Vivekananda brought Hinduism to the West at the 1893 Parliament of the World's Religions. The Vedanta Society has been important in subsequent Parliaments. In September 2021, the State of New Jersey aligned with the World Hindu Council to declare October as Hindu Heritage Month. Today, many Hindu temples, most of them built by Indian Americans, have emerged in different cities and towns in the United States. More than 18 million Americans are now practicing some form of Yoga. Kriya Yoga was introduced to America by Paramahansa Yogananda. A. C. Bhaktivedanta Swami Prabhupada initiated the popular ISKCON, also known as the Hare Krishna movement, while preaching Bhakti yoga. The Sai Baba mandir with the tallest indoor statue in the Western Hemisphere opened in Monroe Township, Middlesex County, New Jersey as the Om Sri Sai Balaji Temple in 2024. On October 30, 2024, the State of New Jersey legally designated October of every year to be Hindu Heritage Month.

==== Sikhs ====
From the time of their arrival to the U.S. in the late 1800s, Sikh women and men have been making notable contributions to American society. In 2007, there were estimated to be between 250,000 and 500,000 Sikhs living in the United States, with largest populations living on the East and West Coasts, together with smaller additional populations in Detroit, Chicago, and Austin. The United States also has a number of non-Punjabi converts to Sikhism. Sikh men are typically identifiable by their unshorn beards and turbans (head coverings), articles of their faith. Many organizations like World Sikh Organisation (WSO), Sikh Riders of America, SikhNet, Sikh Coalition, SALDEF, United Sikhs, National Sikh Campaign continue to educate people about Sikhism. There are many "Gurudwaras" Sikh temples present in all states of USA.

==== Jains ====
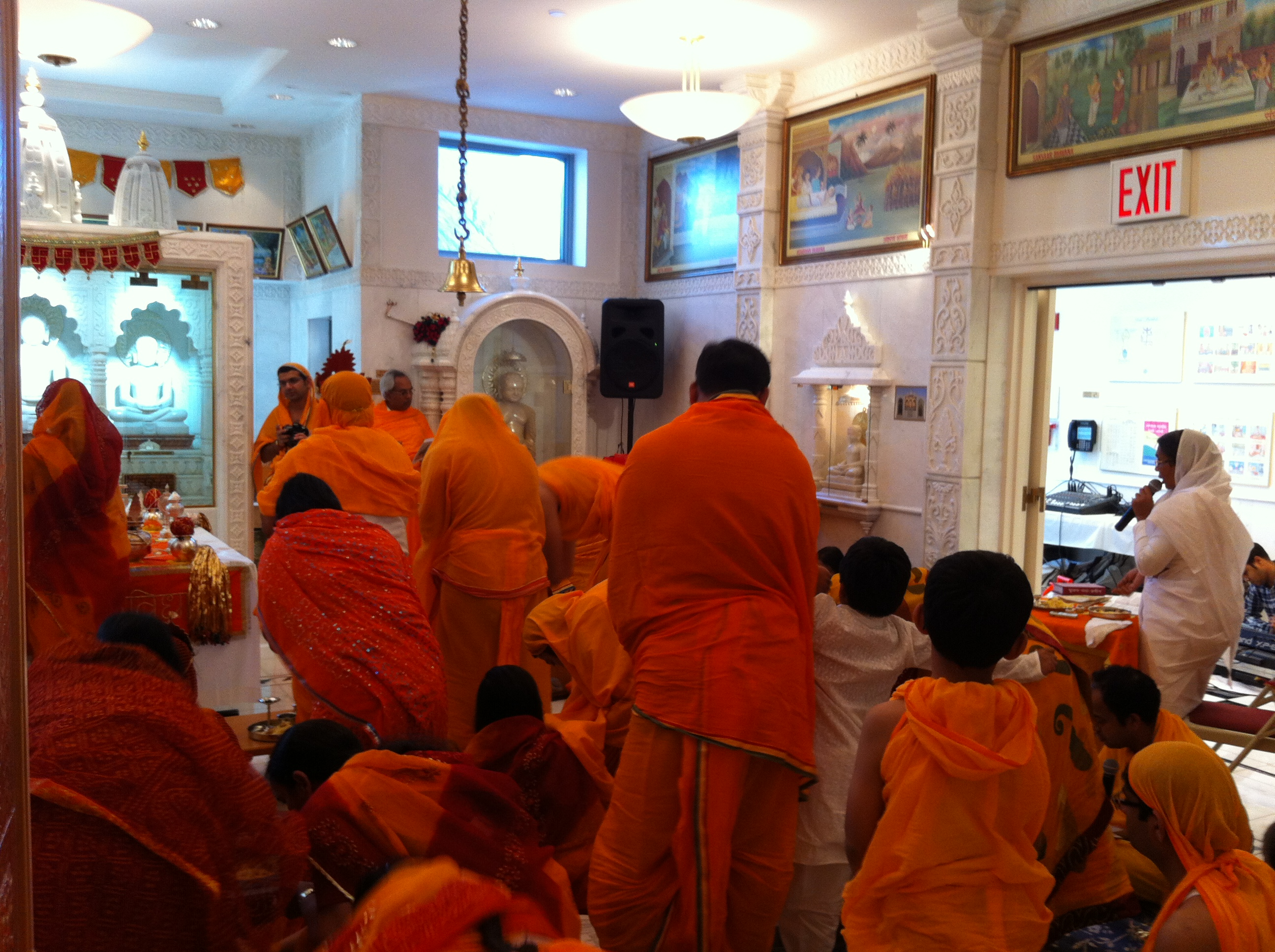
Das Lakshana (Paryushana) celebrations at the Jain Center of America, Queens, New York City, the oldest Jain temple in the Western Hemisphere

Adherents of Jainism first arrived in the United States in the 20th century. Jain immigration became more significant in the second half of the 20th century. The U.S. has since become the epicenter of the Jain diaspora. Jains in America are also one of the highest-earning socio-economic adherents of any religion in the United States. The Federation of Jain Associations in North America is an umbrella organization of local American and Canadian Jain congregations. Unlike India and United Kingdom, the Jain community in United States does not find sectarian differences—both Digambara and Śvētāmbara share a common roof.

==== Muslims ====
Zohran Mamdani, Hasan Minhaj, Fareed Zakaria, Aziz Ansari, and Pir Vilayat Inayat Khan are a few well-known Indian American Muslims. Indian Muslim Americans also congregate with other American Muslims, including those from Pakistan, Bangladesh, Nepal, Sri Lanka, Bhutan, Myanmar, and East Africa when there are events particularly related to their faith and religious believes as the same can be applied for any other religious community, but there are prominent organizations such as the Indian Muslim Council – USA. New Jersey and New York contain notable numbers of mosques utilized by Muslims of Indian origin.

==== Christians ====
Saint Thomas Christians (Syro-Malabar Church, Syro-Malankara Catholic Church, Chaldean Syrian Church, Knanaya Church, Malankara Orthodox Syrian Church, Jacobite Syrian Christian Church, CSI Syrian Christians, Mar Thoma Syrian Church, Pentecostal Syrian Christians and St. Thomas Evangelical Church of India) from Kerala have established their own places of worship across the United States. The website USIndian.org has collected a comprehensive list of all the traditional St. Thomas Christian Churches in the U.S. The Syro-Malabar Church, an Eastern Catholic Church, native to India since the 1st century, established St. Thomas Syro-Malabar diocese of Chicago was established in the year 2001. St. Thomas day is celebrated in this church on July 3 every year.

There are also Catholic Indians hailing originally from Goa, Karnataka and Kerala, who attend the same services as other American Catholics, but may celebrate the feast of Saint Francis Xavier as a special event of their identity.

There are many other Protestant Indian Christian churches across the US, including India Pentecostal Church of God, Assemblies of God in India, Church of God (Full Gospel) in India, Church of South India, Church of North India, Christhava Tamil Koil, The Pentecostal Mission, Sharon Pentecostal Church, Independent Non Denominational Churches like Heavenly Feast, Plymouth Brethren.

The Indian Christian Americans have formed the Federation of Indian American Christian Organizations of North America (FIACONA) to represent a network of Indian Christian organizations in the U.S. FIACONA estimates the Indian American Christian population to be 1,050,000.

==== Others ====
The large Parsi and Irani community is represented by the Federation of Zoroastrian Associations of North America. Indian Jews are perhaps the smallest organized religious group among Indian Americans, consisting of approximately 350 members in the U.S. They form the Indian Jewish Congregation of USA, with their headquarters in New York City.

==== Deepavali/Diwali as school holiday ====
Momentum has been growing to recognize the Dharmic holy day Deepavali (Diwali) as a holiday on school district calendars in the New York City metropolitan area. New York City announced in October 2022 that Diwali would be an official school holiday commencing in 2023.

Passaic, New Jersey established Diwali as a school holiday in 2005. South Brunswick, New Jersey in 2010 became the first of the many school districts with large Indian student populations in Middlesex County in New Jersey to add Diwali to the school calendar. Glen Rock, New Jersey in February 2015 became the first municipality in Bergen County, with its own burgeoning Indian population post-2010, to recognize Diwali as an annual school holiday, while thousands in Bergen County celebrated the first U.S. county-wide Diwali Mela festival under a unified sponsorship banner in 2016, while Fair Lawn in Bergen County has celebrated an internationally prominent annual Holi celebration since 2022. Diwali/Deepavali is also recognized by Monroe Township, New Jersey.

Efforts have been undertaken in Millburn, Monroe Township, West Windsor-Plainsboro, Bernards Township, and North Brunswick, New Jersey, Long Island, as well as in New York City (ultimately successfully), among other school districts in the metropolitan region, to make Diwali a holiday on the school calendar. According to the Star-Ledger, Edison, New Jersey councilman Sudhanshu Prasad has noted parents' engagement in making Deepavali a holiday there; while in Jersey City, the four schools with major Asian Indian populations mark the holiday by inviting parents to the school buildings for festivities. Mahatma Gandhi Elementary School is located in Passaic, New Jersey. Efforts are also progressing toward making Diwali and Eid official holidays at all 24 school districts in Middlesex County. At least 12 school districts on Long Island closed for Diwali in 2022, and over 20 in New Jersey.

==== Ethnicity ====
Like the terms "Asian American" or "South Asian American", the term "Indian American" is also an umbrella label applying to a variety of views, values, lifestyles, and appearances. Although Asian Indian Americans retain a high level of ethnic identity, they are known to assimilate into American culture while at the same time keeping the culture of their ancestors.

== Linguistic affiliation ==
Ethnolinguistic composition of the Indian diaspora in US (2017 est.)
1. Hindustani (46.0%)
2. Telugu (13.0%)
3. Punjabi (10.0%)
4. Tamil (9.00%)
5. Gujarati (8.00%)
6. Marathi (5.00%)
7. Malayalam (4.00%)
8. Bengali (3.00%)
9. Kannada (2.00%)

The United States is home to various associations that promote Indian languages and cultures. Some major organizations include:

- Association of Kannada Kootas of America (AKKA)
- Federation of Kerala Associations in North America (FOKANA)
- Federation of Tamil Sangams of North America (FeTNA)
- North America Vishwa Kannada Association (NAVIKA)
- North American Bengali Conference (NABC)
- Telugu Association of North America (TANA)
- The Odisha Society of the Americas (OSA)
- Maharashtra Mandal (MM)

== Business ==
=== Food companies ===
Patel Brothers is a supermarket chain originally started in Chicago serving the Indian diaspora, with 57 locations in 19 U.S. states—primarily located in the New Jersey/New York Metropolitan Area, attributable to its large Indian population, and with the East Windsor/Monroe Township, New Jersey location representing the world's largest and busiest Indian grocery store outside India, the store has therefore expanded to nearby Hamilton, New Jersey.

Deep Foods, founded in 1977 and based in Union Township, New Jersey, is one of the largest Indian food companies in the US. Specializing in frozen Indian food, their products were sold in around 20,000 stores as of 2024.

=== Biopharma companies ===
Dr. Reddy's Laboratories, Aurobindo Pharma, and Biocon Biologics, all biopharmaceutical companies based in South India, have established North American headquarters in central New Jersey.

=== IT Services companies ===
Tata Consultancy Services U.S. headquarters is based in Edison, New Jersey, with offices in New York City. Cognizant is headquartered in Teaneck, New Jersey, while Wipro is based in East Brunswick, New Jersey.

=== Notable Indian Americans in the business and technology industry ===
- Ajay Banga, President of World Bank Group
- Anjali Sud, CEO of Tubi and Former CEO of Vimeo
- Anirudh Devgan, CEO and President of Cadence Design Systems
- Arvind Krishna, CEO of IBM
- Aravind Srinivas, co-founder, president and CEO of Perplexity AI
- Baiju Bhatt, Founder of Aetherflux and co-founder and Co-CEO of Robinhood
- Balaji Srinivasan, co-founder of genomics company Counsyl, Chief Technology Officer of Coinbase
- Binu Girija, CEO of Way.com
- Bharat Desai, Billionaire and Chairman of Syntel
- C. K. Prahalad, Late world-renowned management guru
- Chandrika Tandon, Businesswoman and Artist
- David C. Paul, Billionaire and Founder and Executive Chairman, Globus Medical
- Dinesh Paliwal, former president and CEO of Harman International
- Dhivya Suryadevara, CEO of Optum Financial, part of UnitedHealth Group
- George Kurian, CEO and board member of NetApp
- Gurbaksh Chahal, Founder of ClickAgent and BlueLithium
- Indra Nooyi, chairwoman and Former CEO of PepsiCo
- Jagdeep Singh, Founder of QuantumScape, optical hardware company Lightera Networks, and telecommunications company Infinera
- Jay Chaudhry, co-founder of Zscaler
- Krishna Bharat, Computer scientist; founder of Google News
- Laxman Narasimhan, former CEO of Starbucks
- Leena Nair, CEO of Chanel
- Naval Ravikant, co-founder of AngelList
- Naveen Jain, Chairman of Moon Express
- Neal Mohan, CEO of YouTube
- Neerja Sethi, Billionaire and Co-Founded IT consulting and outsourcing firm Syntel
- Nikesh Arora, CEO and chairman of Palo Alto Networks
- Niraj Shah, co-founder, Co-chairman & CEO, Wayfair
- Nirav Tolia, co-founder of Nextdoor
- Nirmal Saverimuttu, CEO of Virgin Voyages
- Parag Agrawal, former CEO of Twitter, Inc.
- Punit Renjen, former CEO of Deloitte
- Rahul Goyal, president and CEO at Molson Coors Beverage Company
- Raj Sardana, Billionaire and the founder and CEO of Innova Solutions
- Raj Subramaniam, CEO and President of FedEx Corporation
- Rajat Gupta, former MD of McKinsey & Company
- Rajiv Jain, Billionaire and Chairman & Chief Investment Officer of GQG Partners
- Rakesh Gangwal, 2024 Forbes 400 Billionaire, cofounder of Indigo Airlines.
- Ram Shriram, Billionaire venture capitalist
- Ramani Ayer, former CEO and chairman of The Hartford
- Ravi Kumar Singisetti, CEO of Cognizant
- Reena Ninan, Owner of Good Trouble Productions
- Reshma Kewalramani, CEO and president of Vertex Pharmaceuticals
- Revathi Advaithi, CEO of Flex
- Sabeer Bhatia, co-founder of Hotmail
- Sanjay Mehrotra, co-founder of SanDisk and CEO of Micron
- Sanjit Biswas, co-founder of Cisco Meraki and Samsara
- Satya Nadella, CEO of Microsoft
- Shantanu Narayen, CEO of Adobe Inc.
- Shruti Miyashiro, CEO of Digital Federal Credit Union
- Srinivas (Srini) Gopalan, CEO of T-Mobile
- Sundar Pichai, CEO of Alphabet, the parent company of Google
- Thomas Kurian, CEO of Google Cloud Platform
- Vasant Narasimhan, CEO of Novartis
- Vimal Kapur, CEO of Honeywell
- Vinod Khosla, Founder of Khosla Ventures and co-founder of Sun Microsystems
- Vivek Sankaran, former president and chief executive officer of Albertsons

== Culture ==
=== Media ===
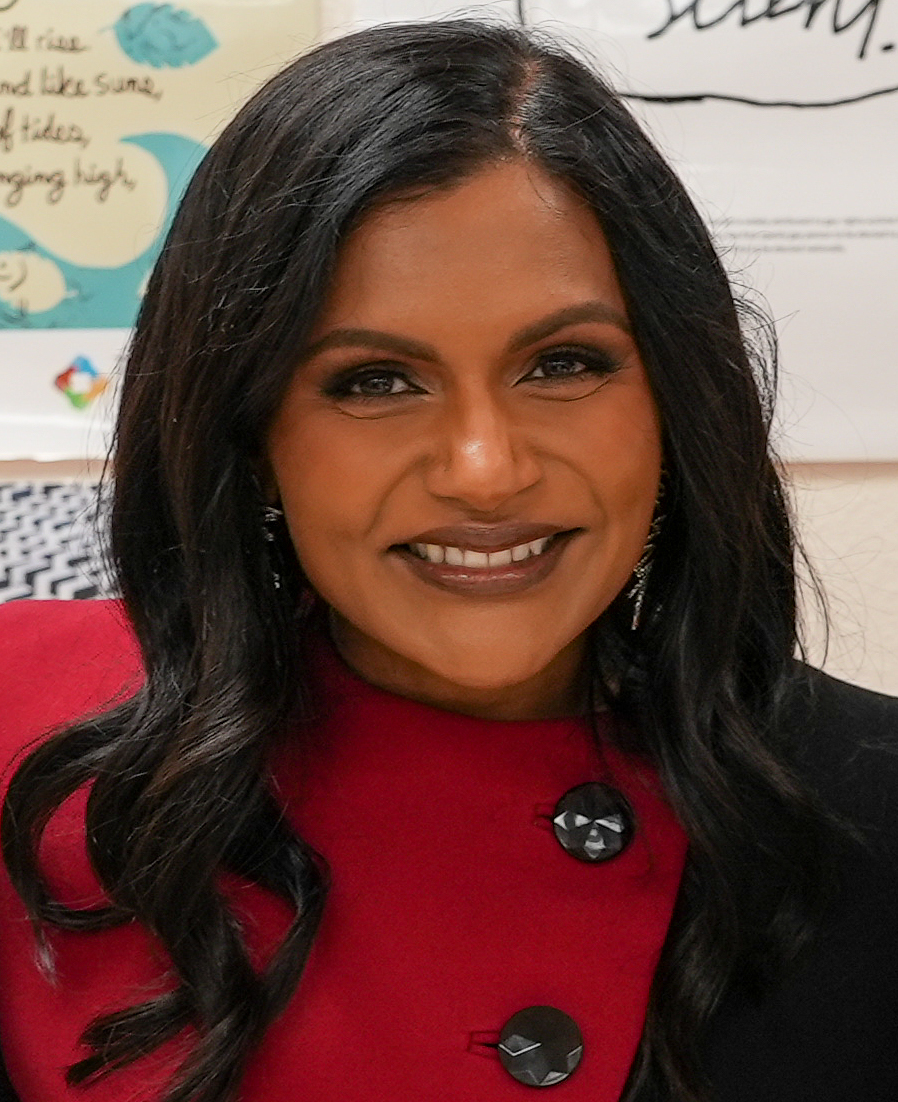
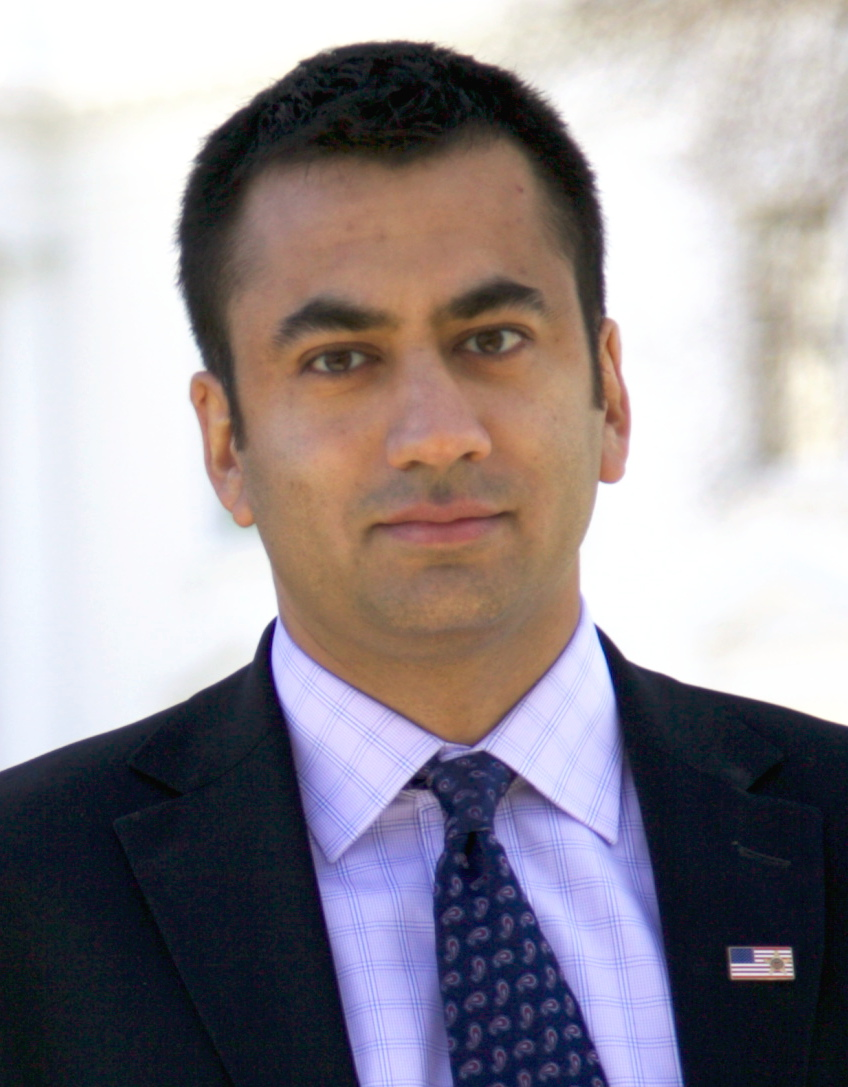
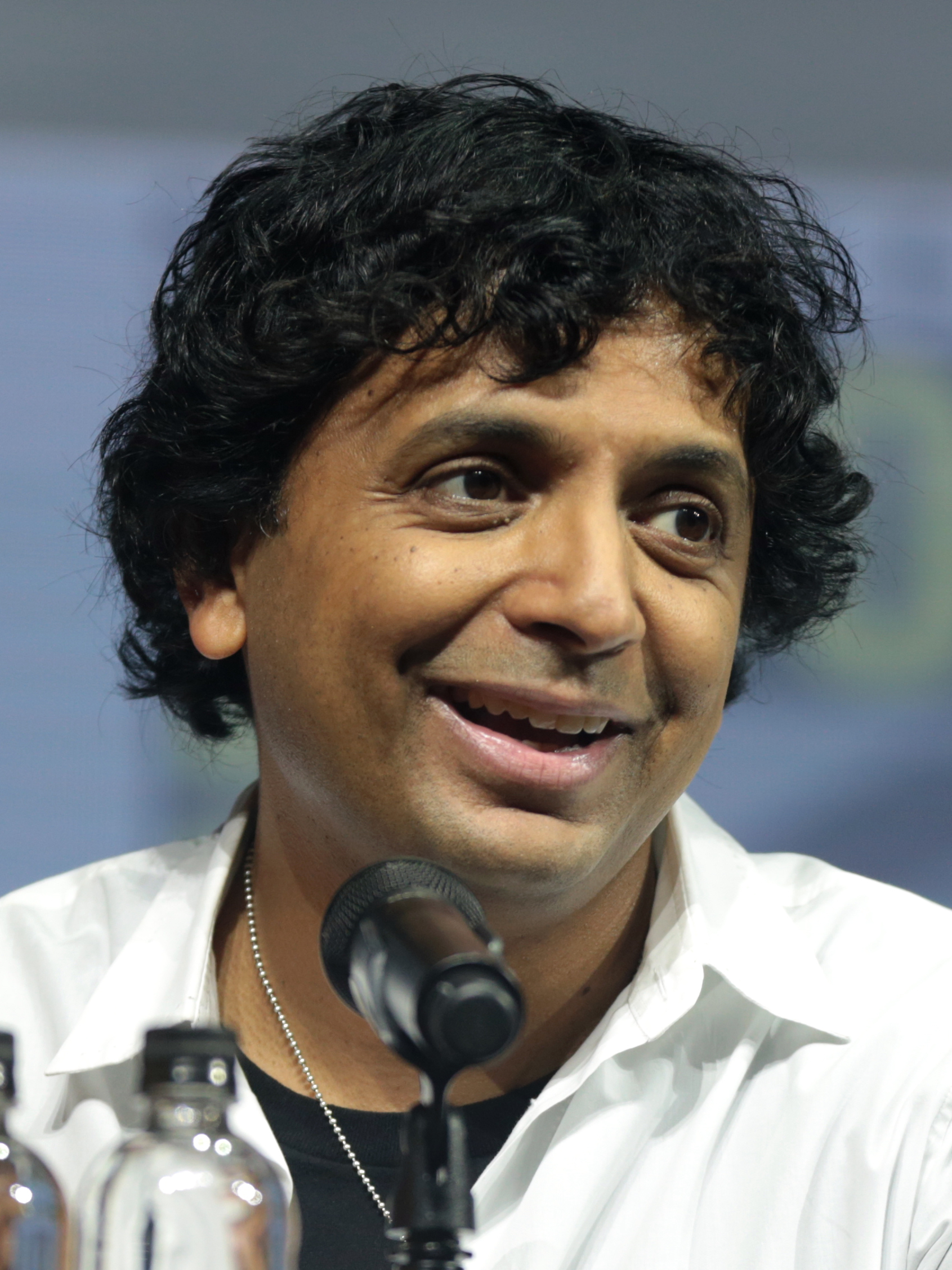
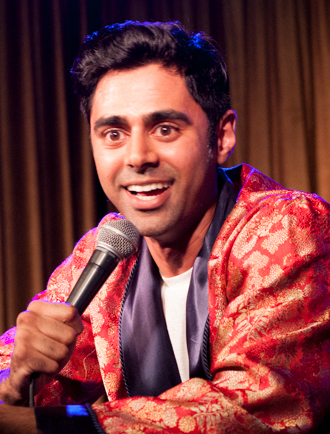

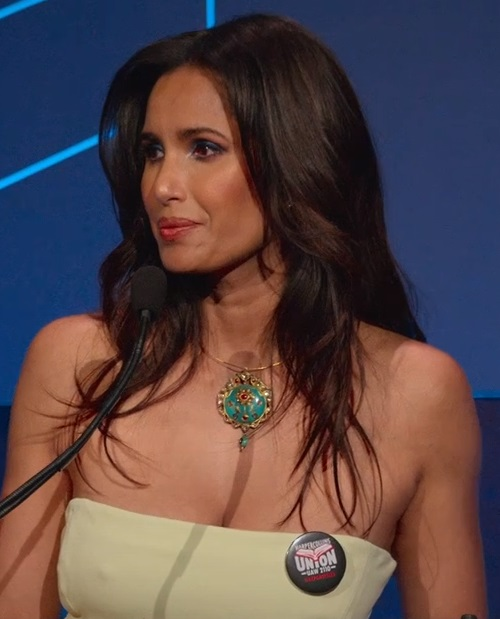
Lakshmi in 2022

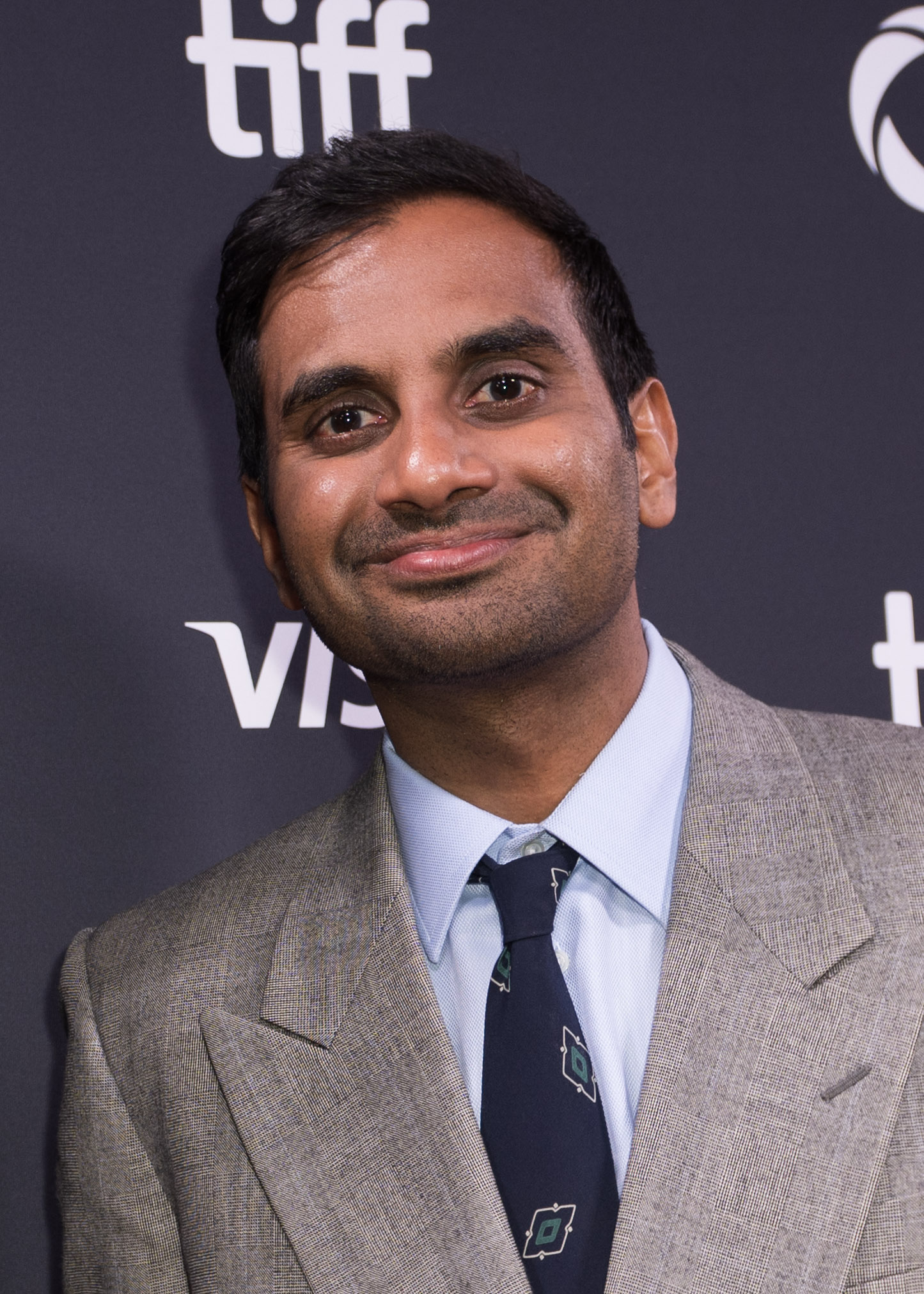
- Various celebrities, from top, left to right: Mindy Kaling • Kal Penn • M. Night Shyamalan • Hasan Minhaj • Padma Lakshmi • Aziz Ansari

Tamil, Gujarati, Bengali, Telugu, Marathi, Punjabi, Malayalam, and Hindi radio stations are available in areas with high Indian populations, for example, Punjabi Radio USA and Easy96.com in the New York City metropolitan area, KLOK 1170 AM in San Francisco, KSJO Bolly 92.3FM in San Jose, California; RBC Radio; Radio Humsafar, Desi Junction in Chicago; Radio Salaam Namaste and FunAsia Radio in Dallas; and Masala Radio, FunAsia Radio, Sangeet Radio, Radio Naya Andaz in Houston and Washington Bangla Radio on Internet from the Washington DC Metro Area. There are also some radio stations broadcasting in Tamil within these communities. Houston-based Kannada Kaaranji radio focuses on a multitude of programs for children and adults.

AVS (Asian Variety Show) and Namaste America are South Asian programming available in most of the U.S. that is free to air and can be watched with a television antenna.

Several cable and satellite television providers offer Indian channels: Sony TV, Zee TV, TV Asia, Star Plus, Sahara One, Colors, Sun TV, ETV, Big Magic, regional channels, and others have offered Indian content for subscription, such as the Cricket World Cup. There is also an American cricket channel called Willow.

Many metropolitan areas with large Indian American populations now have movie theaters that specialize in showing Indian movies, especially from Bollywood (Hindi), Kollywood (Tamil), and Tollywood (Telugu).

In July 2005, MTV premiered a spin-off network called MTV Desi which targets Indian Americans. It has been discontinued by MTV.

In 2012, the film Not a Feather, but a Dot directed by Teju Prasad, was released which investigates the history, perceptions and changes in the Indian American community over the last century.

In popular media, several Indian American personalities have made their mark in recent years, including Ashok Amritraj, M. Night Shyamalan, Kovid Gupta, Lara Raj, Raja Kumari, Sheetal Sheth, Kal Penn, Sendhil Ramamurthy, Padma Lakshmi, Hari Kondabolu, Karan Brar, Aziz Ansari, Hasan Minhaj, Poorna Jagannathan, and Mindy Kaling. In the 2023 film Spider-Man: Across the Spider-Verse, the fictional world of Mumbattan (portmanteau of Mumbai and Manhattan) is introduced.

=== Literature ===
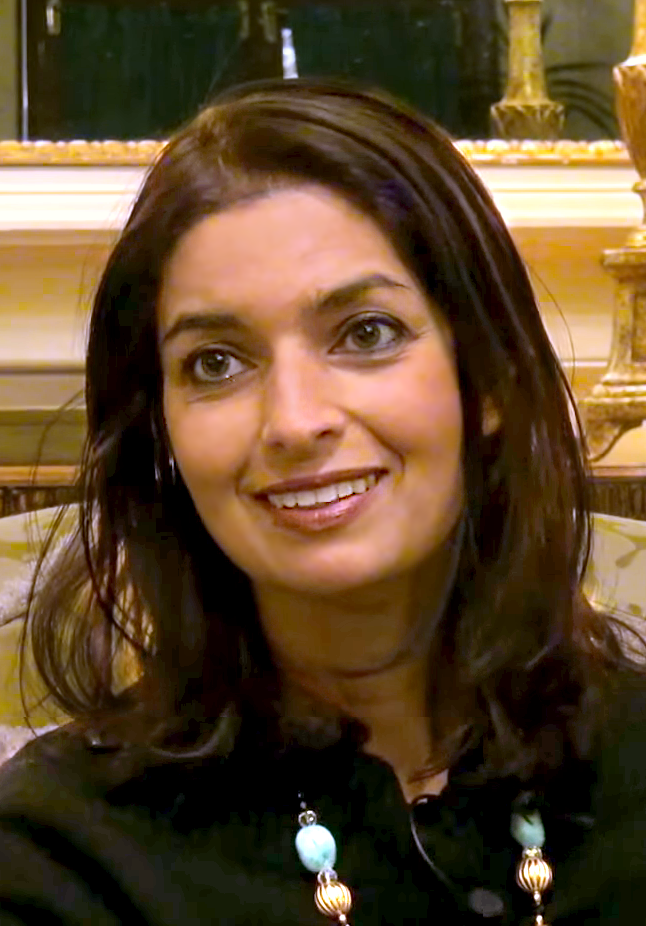
Pulitzer Prize-winning author and Barnard College professor Jhumpa Lahiri explores the complexities of Indian American identity.

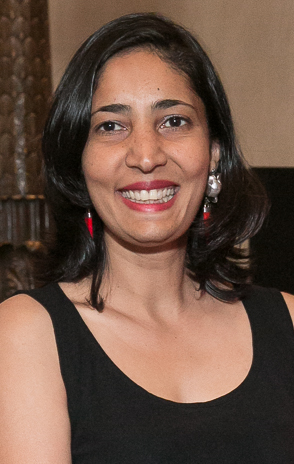
Kiran Desai, winner of the 2006 Man Booker Prize

Indian American literature is a significant and developing body of writing that focuses on the experiences of Indians and their descendants in the United States. It deals with themes such as immigration, identity, belonging, culture clash, adaptation, displacement and nostalgia. It also provides insights about language, family, religion, food, marriage, and generational differences. Through various genres like novels, short stories, poetry, and memoirs, Indian American authors depict the journey of two countries: The traditions of India and the realities of American life. Identity is an integral part of this literature, where many authors examine the struggle of first-generation immigrants who try to preserve Indian culture while adjusting to American society. Second-generation Indian American authors also depict the challenges of balancing both their parents' Indian culture and their upbringing in American culture.

Many Indian American writers have received fame and numerous awards in fiction and non-fiction writing. Certain works by Bharati Mukherjee, such as Jasmine and The Middleman and Other Stories have depicted the Indian-American experience. Jhumpa Lahiri is a notable Indian American writer whose works explore the Indian-immigrant experience in America. Interpreter of Maladies, her first book collection of short stories, which addresses sensitive dilemmas in the lives of Indians or Indian immigrants in America, received the 2000 Pulitzer Prize for Fiction. Her first novel, The Namesake, also has a film adaptation directed by Mira Nair. Her second story collection, Unaccustomed Earth, examines the lives of second and third-generation Indian Americans. Her second novel, The Lowland, was placed on the shortlist for the 2013 Man Booker Prize. Both Lahiri and Akhil Sharma received the Hemingway Foundation/PEN Award for best debut book of fiction for Interpreter of Maladies in 2000 and An Obedient Father in 2001, respectively.The Inheritance of Loss by Kiran Desai explored the main themes of migration, living between two worlds, and between past and present. The novel won a number of awards, including the Booker Prize in 2006, the National Book Critics Circle Fiction Award in 2007, and the 2006 Vodafone Crossword Book Award Other well-known books that are listed in The New York Times Best Seller list include When Dimple Met Rishi by Sandhya Menon, Why Not Me? by Mindy Kaling, A Place for Us by Fatima Farheen Mirza, Cutting for Stone by Abraham Verghese and so on.

=== Sports ===
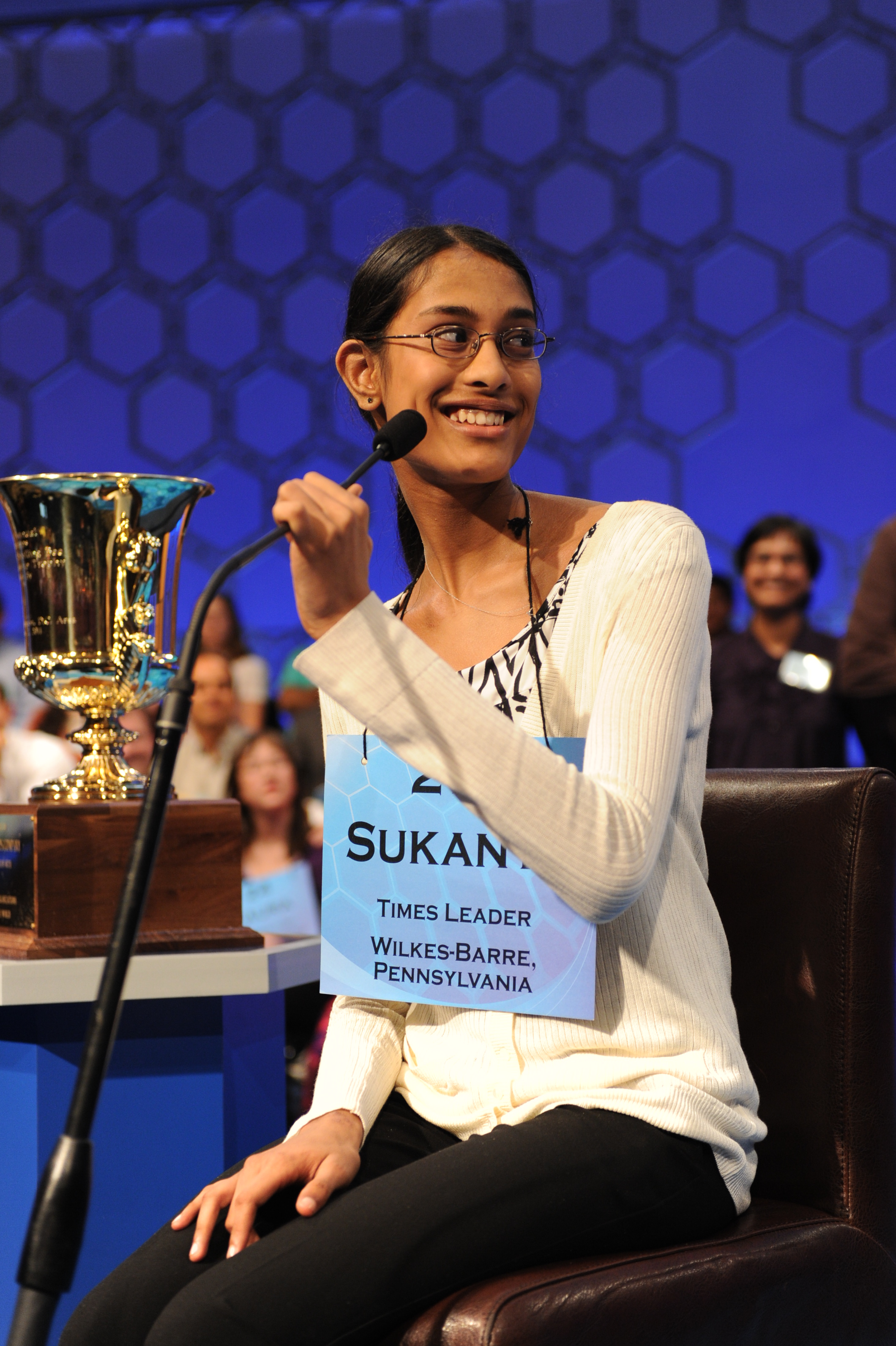
Sukanya Roy, 2011 Scripps National Spelling Bee champion

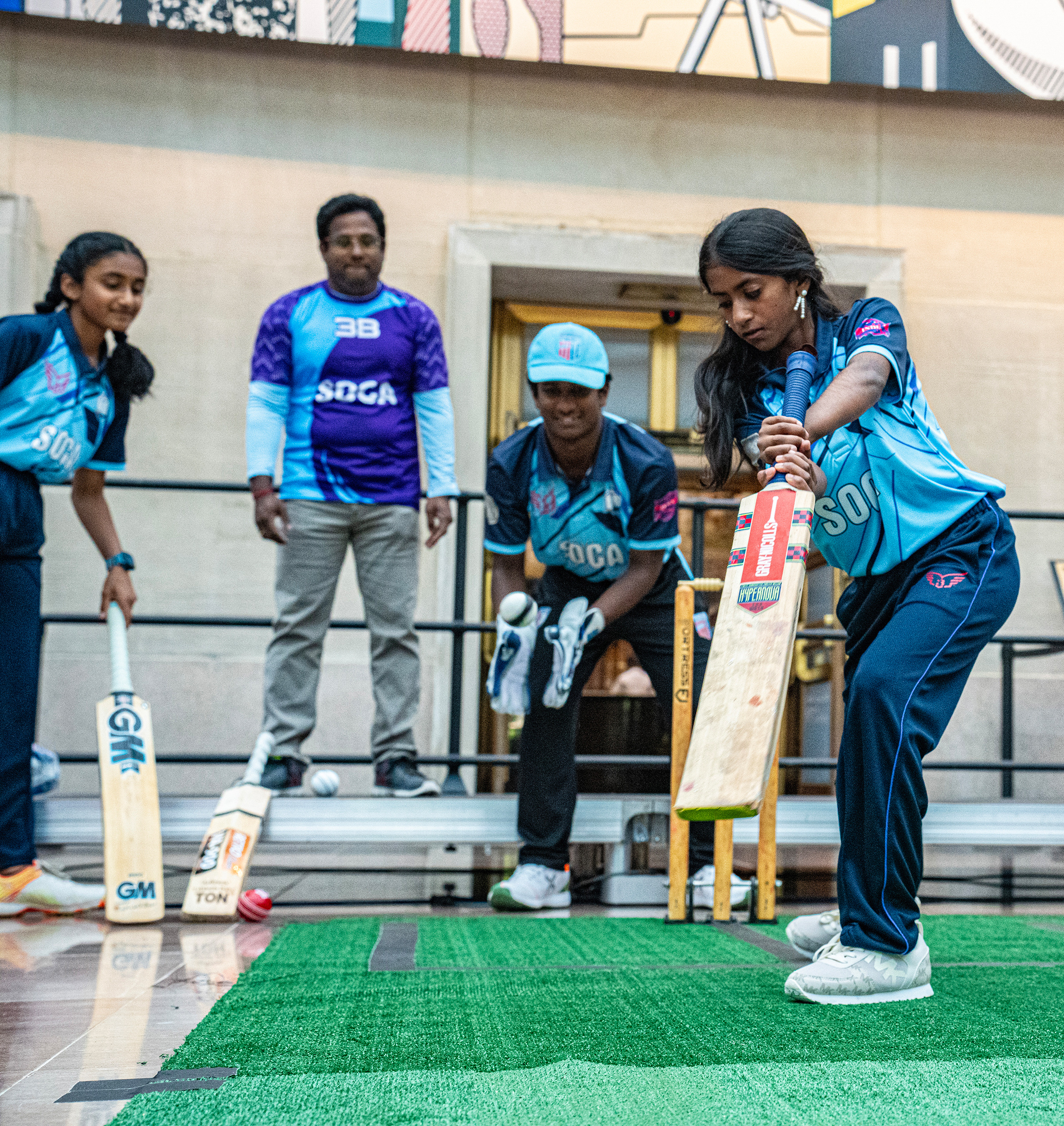
A State Department celebration of the USA hosting the 2024 Men's T20 World Cup

Indian Americans have played a substantial role in increasing the profile of cricket in the United States in the 21st century, helping to launch the nation's highest professional league, Major League Cricket.

=== Indian Independence Day Parade ===
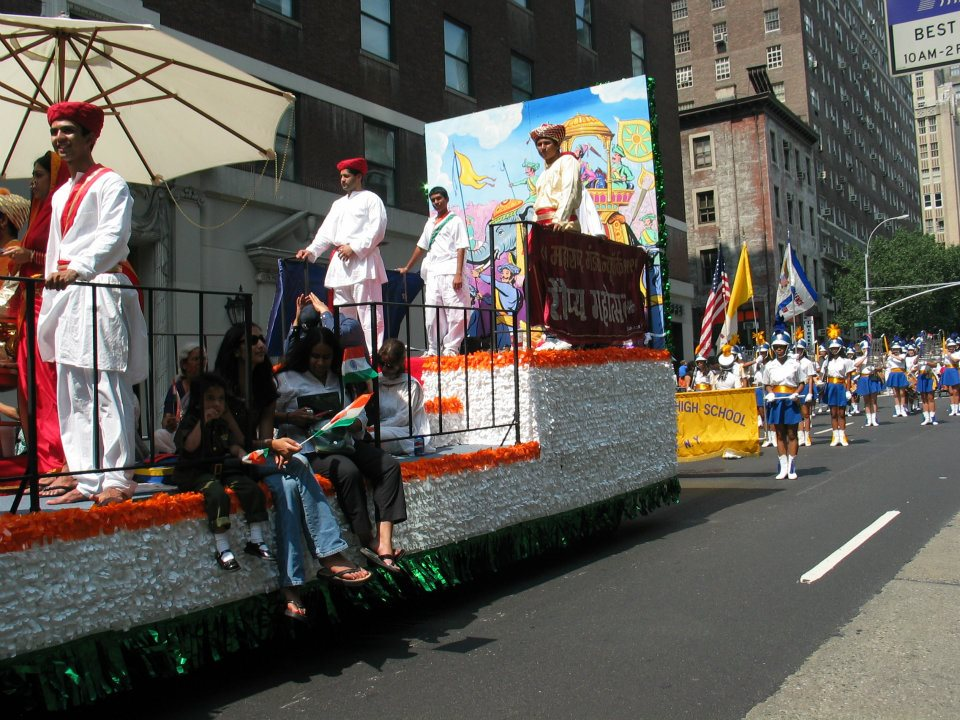
New York City's annual India Day Parade, the world's largest Indian Independence Day parade outside India, marches down Madison Avenue in Midtown Manhattan. The parade addresses controversial themes, including racism, sexism, corruption, and Bollywood.

The annual New York City India Day Parade, held on or approximately every August 15 since 1981, is the world's largest Indian Independence Day parade outside of India and is hosted by The Federation of Indian Associations (FIA). According to the website of Baruch College of the City University of New York, "The FIA, which came into being in 1970 is an umbrella organization meant to represent the diverse Indian population of NYC. Its mission is to promote and further the interests of its 500,000 members and to collaborate with other Indian cultural organization. The FIA acts as a mouth piece for the diverse Indian Asian population in United States, and is focused on furthering the interests of this diverse community. The parade begins on East 38th Street and continues down Madison Avenue in Midtown Manhattan until it reaches 28th Street. At the review stand on 28th Street, the grand marshal and various celebrities greet onlookers. Throughout the parade, participants find themselves surrounded by the saffron, white and green colors of the Indian flag. They can enjoy Indian food, merchandise booths, live dancing and music present at the Parade. After the parade is over, various cultural organizations and dance schools participate in program on 23rd Street and Madison Avenue until 6PM." The New York/New Jersey metropolitan region's second-largest India Independence Day parade takes place in Little India, Edison/Iselin in Middlesex County, New Jersey, annually in August.

==== Sikh Day Vaisakhi Parade ====
The world's largest Sikh Day Parade outside India, celebrating Vaisakhi and the season of renewal, is held in Manhattan annually in April.

== Progress ==
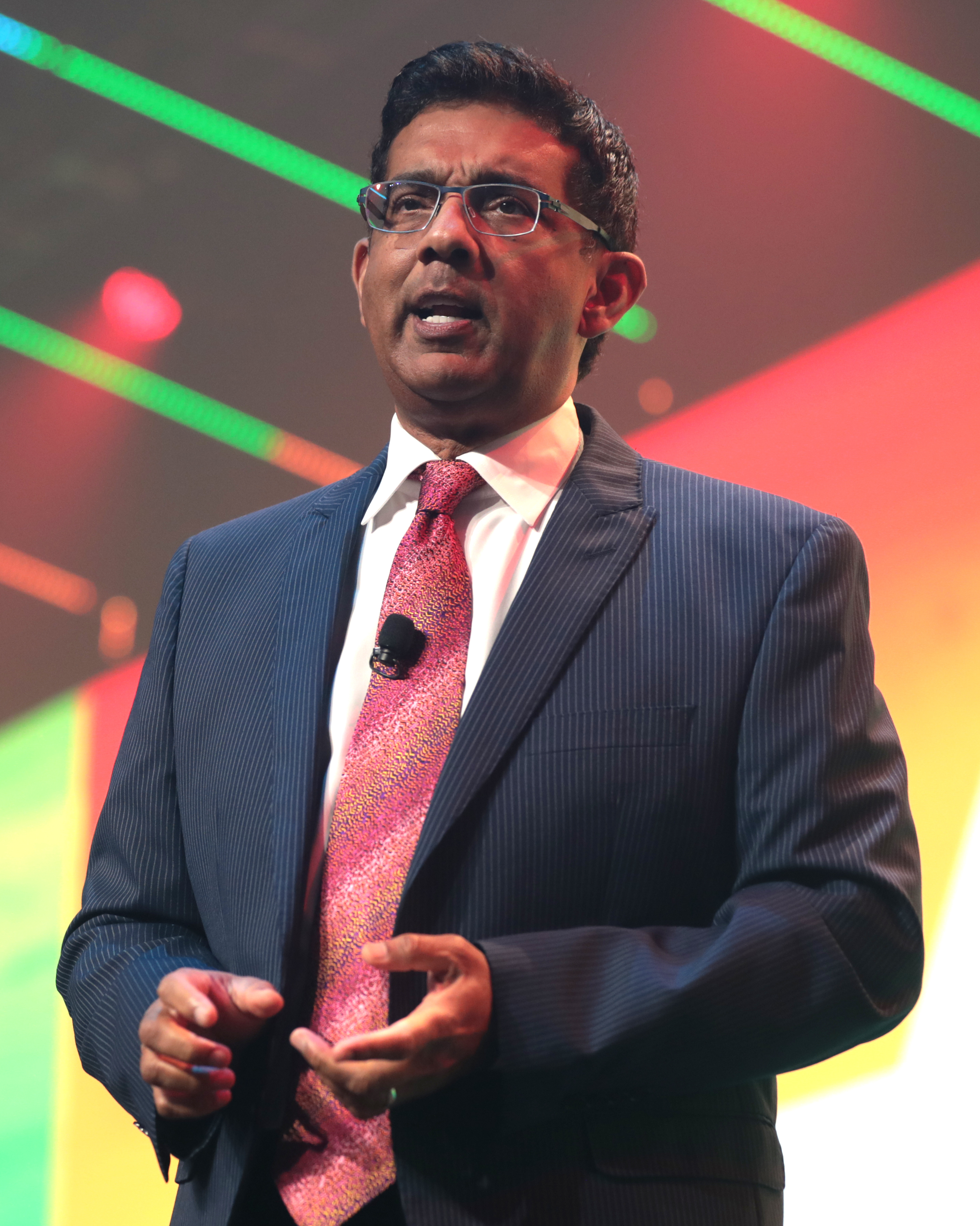
Political Commentator Dinesh D'Souza

=== Timeline ===
- 1600: Beginning of the East India Company.
- 1635: An "East Indian" is documented present in Jamestown, Virginia.
- 1680: Due to anti-miscegenation laws, a mixed-race girl born to an Indian father and an Irish mother is classified as mulatto and sold into slavery.
- 1790: The first officially confirmed Indian immigrant arrives in the United States from Madras, South India, on a British ship.
- 1899–1914: The first significant wave of Indian immigrants arrives in the United States, mostly consisting of Sikh farmers and businessmen from the Punjab region of British India. They arrive in Angel Island, California via Hong Kong. They start businesses including farms and lumber mills in California, Oregon, and Washington.
- 1909: Bhicaji Balsara becomes the first known Indian-born person to gain naturalized U.S. citizenship. As a Parsi, he was considered a "pure member of the Persian sect" and therefore a free White person. The judge Emile Henry Lacombe, of the Southern District of New York, only gave Balsara citizenship on the hope that the United States attorney would indeed challenge his decision and appeal it to create "an authoritative interpretation" of the law. The U.S. attorney adhered to Lacombe's wishes and took the matter to the Circuit Court of Appeals in 1910. The Circuit Court of Appeal agrees that Parsis are classified as white.
- 1912: The first Sikh gurdwara opens in Stockton, California.
- 1913: A. K. Mozumdar becomes the second Indian-born person to earn U.S. citizenship, having convinced the Spokane district judge that he was "Caucasian" and met the requirements of naturalization law that restricted citizenship to free White persons. In 1923, as a result of United States v. Bhagat Singh Thind, his citizenship was revoked.
- 1914: Dhan Gopal Mukerji obtains a graduate degree from Stanford University, studying also at University of California, Berkeley and later goes on to win the Newbery Medal in 1928, and thus becomes the first successful India-born man of letters in the United States, as well as the first popular Indian writer in English.
- 1917: The Barred Zone Act passes in Congress through two-thirds majority, overriding President Woodrow Wilson's earlier veto. Asians, including Indians, are barred from entering the United States.
- 1918: Due to anti-miscegenation laws, there was significant controversy in Arizona when an Indian farmer B. K. Singh married the sixteen-year-old daughter of one of his White American tenants.
- 1918: Private Raghunath N. Banawalkar is the first Indian American recruited into the U.S. Army on February 25, 1918, and serves in the Sanitary Detachment of the 305th Infantry Regiment, 77th Division, American Expeditionary Forces in France. Gassed while on active service in October 1918 and subsequently awarded Purple Heart medal.
- 1918: Earliest record of LGBT Indian Americans—Jamil Singh in Sacramento, California
- 1922: Yellapragada Subbarao, a Telugu from the state of Andhra Pradesh in Southern India arrived in Boston on October 26, 1922. He discovered the role of phosphocreatine and adenosine triphosphate (ATP) in muscular activity, which earned him an entry into biochemistry textbooks in the 1930s. He obtained his Ph.D. the same year, and went on to make other major discoveries; including the synthesis of aminopterin (later developed into methotrexate), the first cancer chemotherapy.
- 1923: In United States v. Bhagat Singh Thind, the Supreme Court unanimously rules that Indian people are aliens ineligible for United States citizenship. Bhagat Singh Thind regained his citizenship years later in New York.
- 1943: Republican Clare Boothe Luce and Democrat Emanuel Celler introduce a bill to open naturalization to Indian immigrants to the United States. Prominent Americans Pearl Buck, Louis Fischer, Albert Einstein and Robert Millikan give their endorsement to the bill. President Franklin D. Roosevelt, a Democrat, also endorses the bill, calling for an end to the "statutory discrimination against the Indians".
- 1946: President Harry S. Truman signs into law the Luce–Celler Act of 1946, returning the right to Indian Americans to immigrate to the United States and become naturalized citizens.
- 1956: Dalip Singh Saund elected to the U.S. House of Representatives from California. He was re-elected to a second and third term, winning over 60% of the vote. He is also the first Asian immigrant from any country to be elected to Congress.
- 1962: Zubin Mehta appointed music director of the Los Angeles Philharmonic, becoming the first person of Indian origin to become the principal conductor of a major American orchestra. Subsequently, he was appointed principal conductor of the New York Philharmonic.
- 1964: Amar G. Bose founded Bose Corporation. He was the chairman, primary stockholder, and Technical Director at Bose Corporation. He was former professor of electrical engineering at Massachusetts Institute of Technology.
- 1965: President Lyndon Johnson signs the INS Act of 1965 into law, eliminating per-country immigration quotas and introducing immigration on the basis of professional experience and education. Satinder Mullick is one of the first to immigrate under the new law in November 1965—sponsored by Corning Glass Works.
- 1968: Hargobind Khorana shared the Nobel Prize for Physiology or Medicine with Marshall W. Nirenberg and Robert W. Holley for discovering the mechanisms by which RNA codes for the synthesis of proteins. He was then on faculty at the University of Wisconsin, Madison, but later moved to MIT.
- 1974: Mafat and Tulsi Patel open the first location of Patel Brothers on Devon Avenue in Chicago, one of the first Indian grocery chains in America
- 1975: Launch of India-West, a leading newspaper covering issues of relevance to the Indian American community.
- 1981: Suhas Patil founded Cirrus Logic, one of the first fabless semiconductor companies.
- 1982: Vinod Khosla co-founded Sun Microsystems.
- 1983: Subrahmanyam Chandrasekhar won the Nobel Prize for Physics; Asian Indian Women in America attended the first White House Briefing for Asian American Women. (AAIWA, formed in 1980, is the 1st Indian women's organization in North America.)
- 1985: Balu Natarajan becomes the first Indian American to win the Scripps National Spelling Bee
- 1987: President Ronald Reagan appoints Joy Cherian, the first Indian Commissioner of the United States Equal Employment Opportunity Commission (EEOC).
- 1988: Sanjay Mehrotra co-founded SanDisk.
- 1989: Launch of RBC Radio, the first South Asian-Indian radio station in the United States.
- 1990: Shiva Subramanya (an India-born Nuclear Physicist and Space Scientist working at TRW, Inc) became the first South Asian and first Indian American to win the Medal of Merit, the AFCEA's highest award for a civilian and one of the America's top defense award, in recognition of his exceptional service to AFCEA and the fields of Command, Control, Communications, Computers and Intelligence (C4I).
- 1994: Rajat Gupta elected managing director of McKinsey & Company, the first Indian-born CEO of a multinational company.
- 1994: Guitarist Kim Thayil, of Indian origin, wins Grammy award for his Indian inspired guitarwork on the album Superunknown by his band Soundgarden.
- 1994: Raj Reddy received the ACM Turing Award (with Edward Feigenbaum) "For pioneering the design and construction of large scale artificial intelligence systems, demonstrating the practical importance and potential commercial impact of artificial intelligence technology."
- 1996: Pradeep Sindhu founded Juniper Networks
- 1996: Rajat Gupta and Anil Kumar of McKinsey & Company co-found the Indian School of Business.
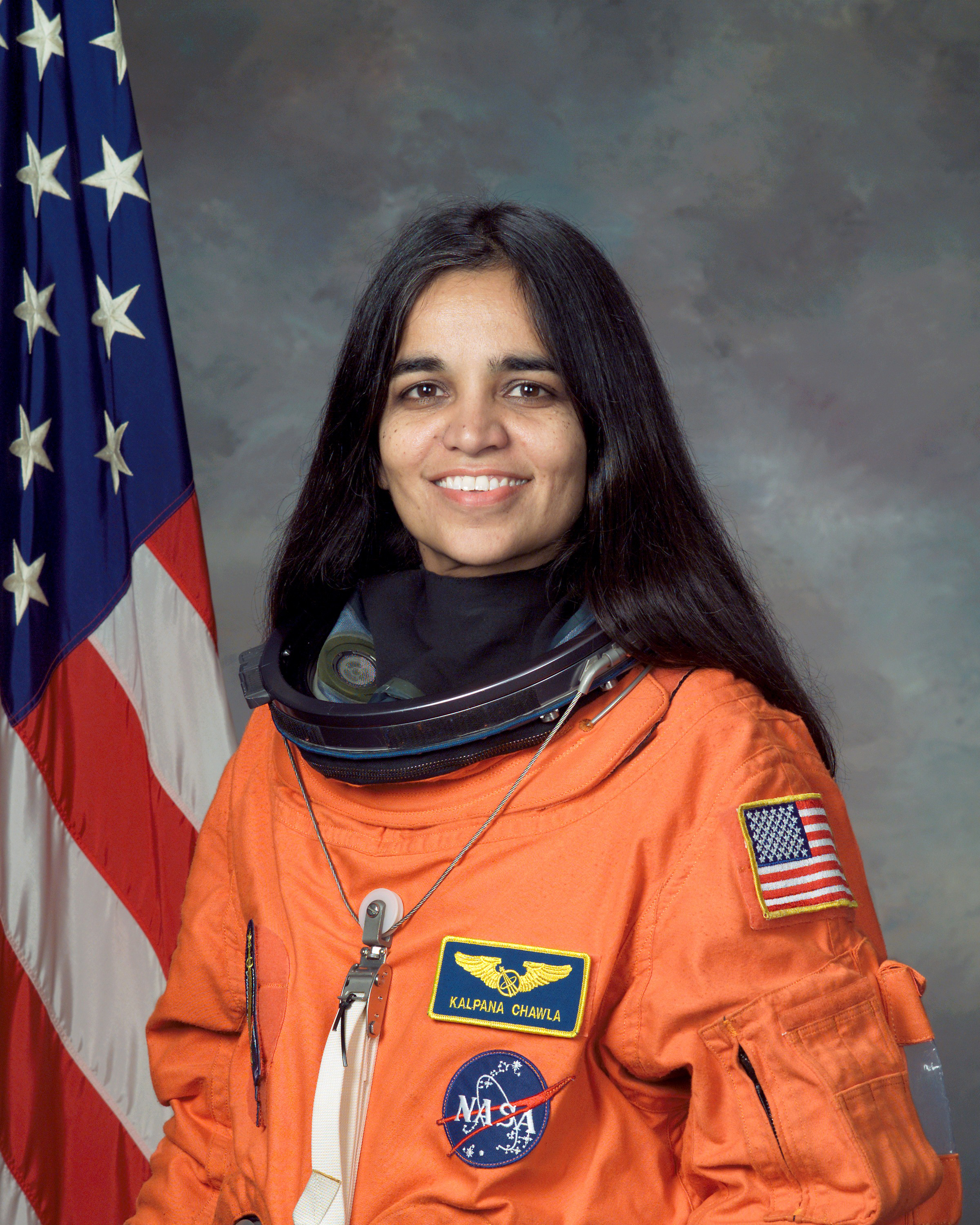
  Kalpana Chawla
- 1997: Kalpana Chawla, one of the six-member crew of STS-87 mission, becomes the first Indian American astronaut.
- 1999: NASA names the third of its four "Great Observatories" Chandra X-ray Observatory after Subrahmanyan Chandrasekhar the Indian-born American astrophysicist and a Nobel laureate.
- 1999: Filmmaker M. Night Shyamalan enters film history with his film The Sixth Sense becoming one of the all-time highest-grossing films worldwide.
- 1999: Rono Dutta becomes the president of United Airlines.
- 2000: Jhumpa Lahiri became the first person of Indian descent to be awarded the Pulitzer Prize for Fiction for her first book Interpreter of Maladies.
- 2001: Professor Dipak C. Jain (born in Tezpur – Assam, India) appointed as dean of the Kellogg School of Management, Northwestern University.
- 2002: Professor of statistics Calyampudi Radhakrishna Rao is awarded National Medal of Science by President George W. Bush.
- 2005: Abhi Talwalkar becomes president and chief executive officer of LSI Corporation
- 2006: Indra Nooyi (born in Chennai, India) appointed as CEO of PepsiCo.
- 2007: Bobby Jindal is elected governor of Louisiana and is the first person of Indian descent to be elected governor of an American state.
- 2007: Renu Khator appointed to a dual-role as chancellor of the University of Houston System and president of the University of Houston.
- 2007: Francisco D'Souza appointed as the president and CEO and of Cognizant Technology Solutions. He is one of the youngest chief executive officers in the software services sector at the age 38 in the United States.
- 2007: Vikram Pandit (born in Nagpur, Maharashtra, India) appointed as CEO of Citigroup. He was previously the president and CEO of the Institutional Securities and Investment Banking Group at Morgan Stanley.
- 2007: Shantanu Narayen appointed as CEO of Adobe Systems.
- 2008: Treasury Secretary Henry Paulson appoints Neel Kashkari as the Interim U.S. Assistant Secretary of the Treasury for Financial Stability.
- 2008: Raj Chetty appointed as professor of economics at Harvard University the age of 29, one of the youngest ever to receive tenure of professorship in the Department of Economics at Harvard.
- 2008: Sanjay Jha appointed as Co-CEO of Motorola, Inc..
- 2008: Establishment of the South Asian American Digital Archive (SAADA) to document the history of the South Asian American community.

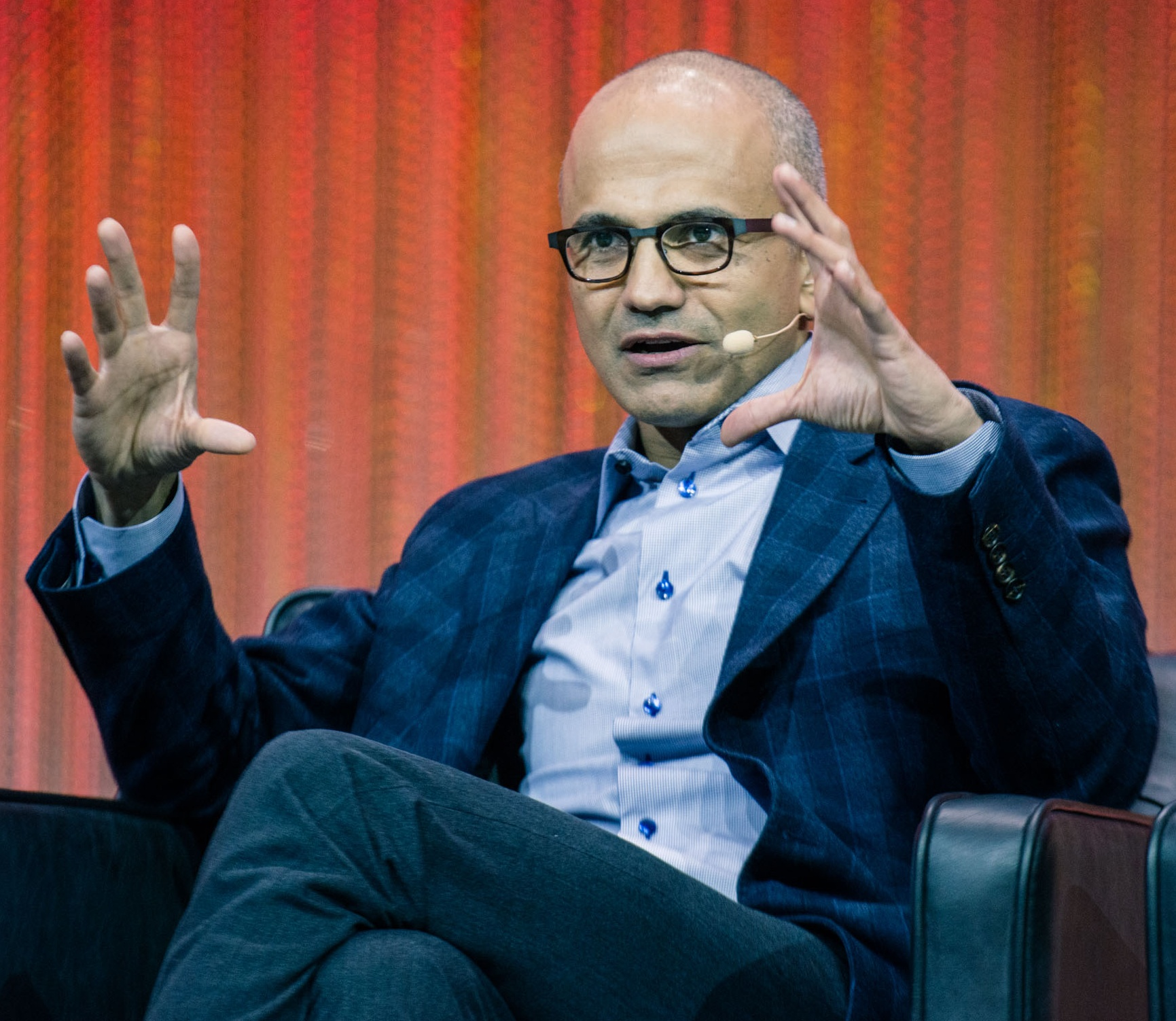
Satya Nadella CEO of Microsoft

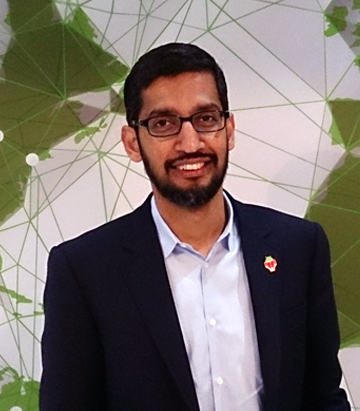
Sundar Pichai CEO of Google

- 2009: President Barack Obama appoints Preet Bharara (born in Firozpur, India; graduate of Harvard College Class of 1990 and Columbia Law School Class of 1993) as United States attorney for the Southern District of New York Manhattan.
- Farah Pandith appointed as Special Representative to Muslim Communities for the United States Department of State.
- 2009: President Barack Obama appoints Aneesh Paul Chopra as the first American Federal Chief Technology Officer of the United States (CTO).
- 2009: President Barack Obama appoints Eboo Patel and Anju Bhargava on President's Advisory Council on Faith Based and Neighborhood Partnerships.
- 2009: President Barack Obama appoints Vinai Thummalapally as the U.S. Ambassador to Belize
- 2009: President Barack Obama nominates Rajiv Shah, M.D. as the new head of United States Agency for International Development.
- 2009: President Barack Obama nominates Islam A. Siddiqui as the Chief Agricultural Negotiator in the Office of the U.S. Trade Representative.
- 2010: President of Harvard University Catherine Drew Gilpin Faust appoints Nitin Nohria as the tenth dean of Harvard Business School.
- 2010: President of University of Chicago Robert Zimmer appoints Sunil Kumar as the dean of University of Chicago Booth School of Business.
- 2010: Deven Sharma appointed president of Standard & Poor's.
- 2010: Ajaypal Banga appointed president and CEO of MasterCard.
- 2010: President Barack Obama nominates Subra Suresh, Dean of Engineering at MIT as director of National Science Foundation.
- 2010: Year marks the most candidates of Indian origin, running for political offices in the United States, including candidates such as Ami Bera.
- 2010: State Representative Nikki Haley is elected Governor of South Carolina and becomes the first Indian American woman and second Indian American in general to serve as governor of a U.S. state.
- 2011: Jamshed Bharucha named president of Cooper Union. Previous to that, he was appointed dean of the Faculty of Arts & Sciences at Dartmouth College in 2001, the first Indian American dean at an Ivy League institution, and Provost at Tufts University in 2002.
- 2011: Satish K. Tripathi appointed as President of University at Buffalo, The State University of New York.
- 2011: Rohit Gupta wins over 100 international awards and accolades for his films Life! Camera Action... and Another Day Another Life.
- 2011: Bobby Jindal is re-elected Governor of Louisiana.
- 2012: Ami Bera is elected to the House of Representatives from California.
- 2013: Vistap Karbhari appointed as president of University of Texas at Arlington
- 2013: Sri Srinivasan is confirmed as a Judge of the United States Court of Appeals for the District of Columbia Circuit.
- 2013: Nina Davuluri wins Miss America 2014.
- 2013: Arun M Kumar appointed as assistant secretary and director general of the U.S. and Foreign Commercial Service, International Trade Administration in the Department of Commerce.
- 2014: Satya Nadella appointed as CEO of Microsoft.

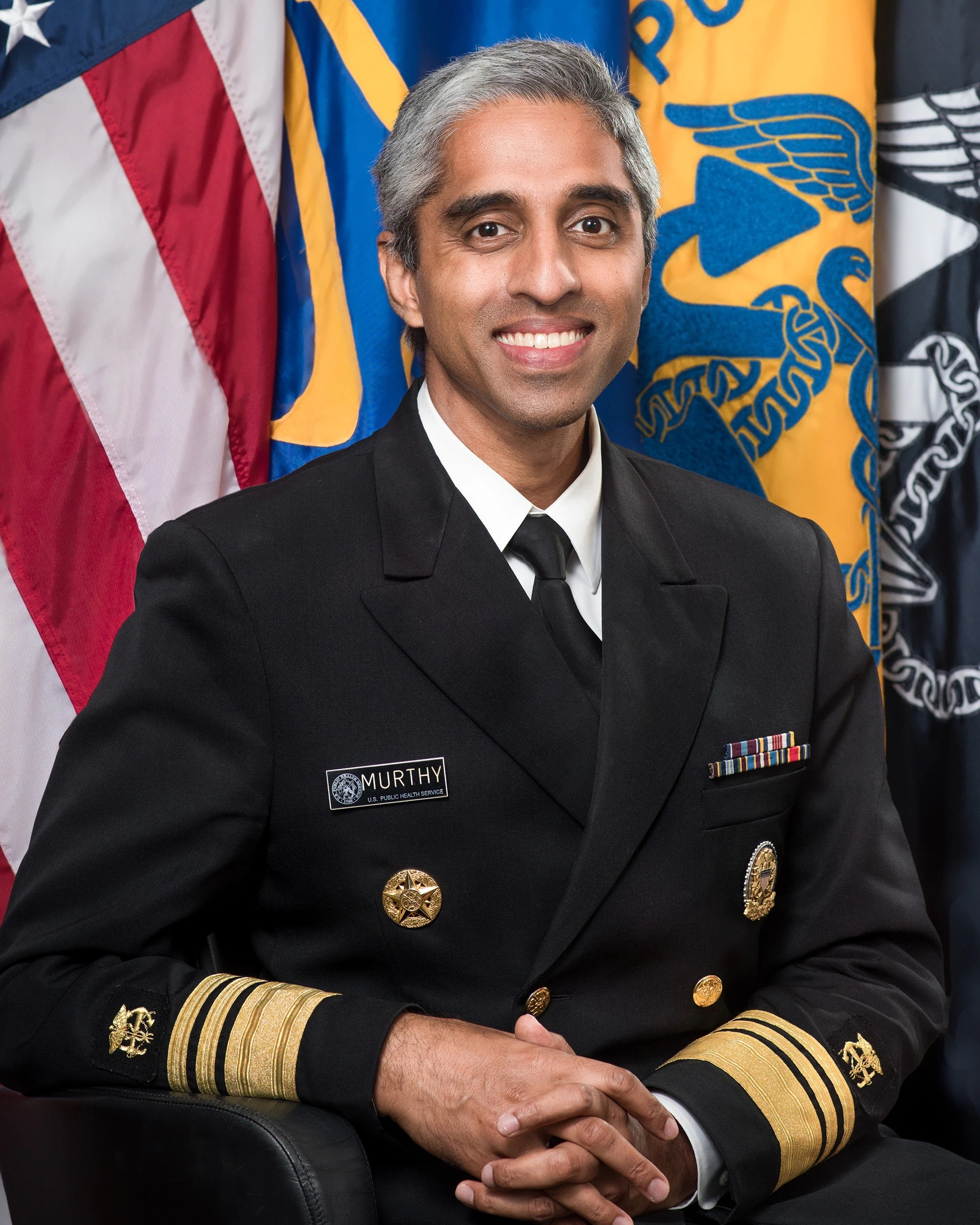
Vivek Murthy, Surgeon General of U.S.; former Vice Admiral of U.S. Health Corps

- 2014: Vivek Murthy appointed as the nineteenth Surgeon General of the United States. He returned to the role again in 2021 to serve as the twenty-first Surgeon General.
- 2014: Rakesh Khurana appointed as the dean of Harvard College, the original founding college of Harvard University.
- 2014: Manjul Bhargava wins Fields Medal in Mathematics.
- 2015: Sundar Pichai appointed as the chairman and CEO of Google.
- 2016: Pramila Jayapal, Ro Khanna, and Raja Krishnamoorthi are elected to the U.S. House of Representatives. This puts the total number of people of Indian and South Asian origin in Congress at 5, the largest in history.
- 2016: President Donald Trump nominates Seema Verma to lead the Centers for Medicare and Medicaid Services. Her nomination is confirmed in 2017.
- 2017: Hasan Minhaj roasts President Donald Trump at the White House Correspondents' Association Dinner, becoming the first Indian American and Muslim American to perform at the event.
- 2017: President Donald Trump nominates Ajit Pai as chairman of the Federal Communications Commission (FCC).

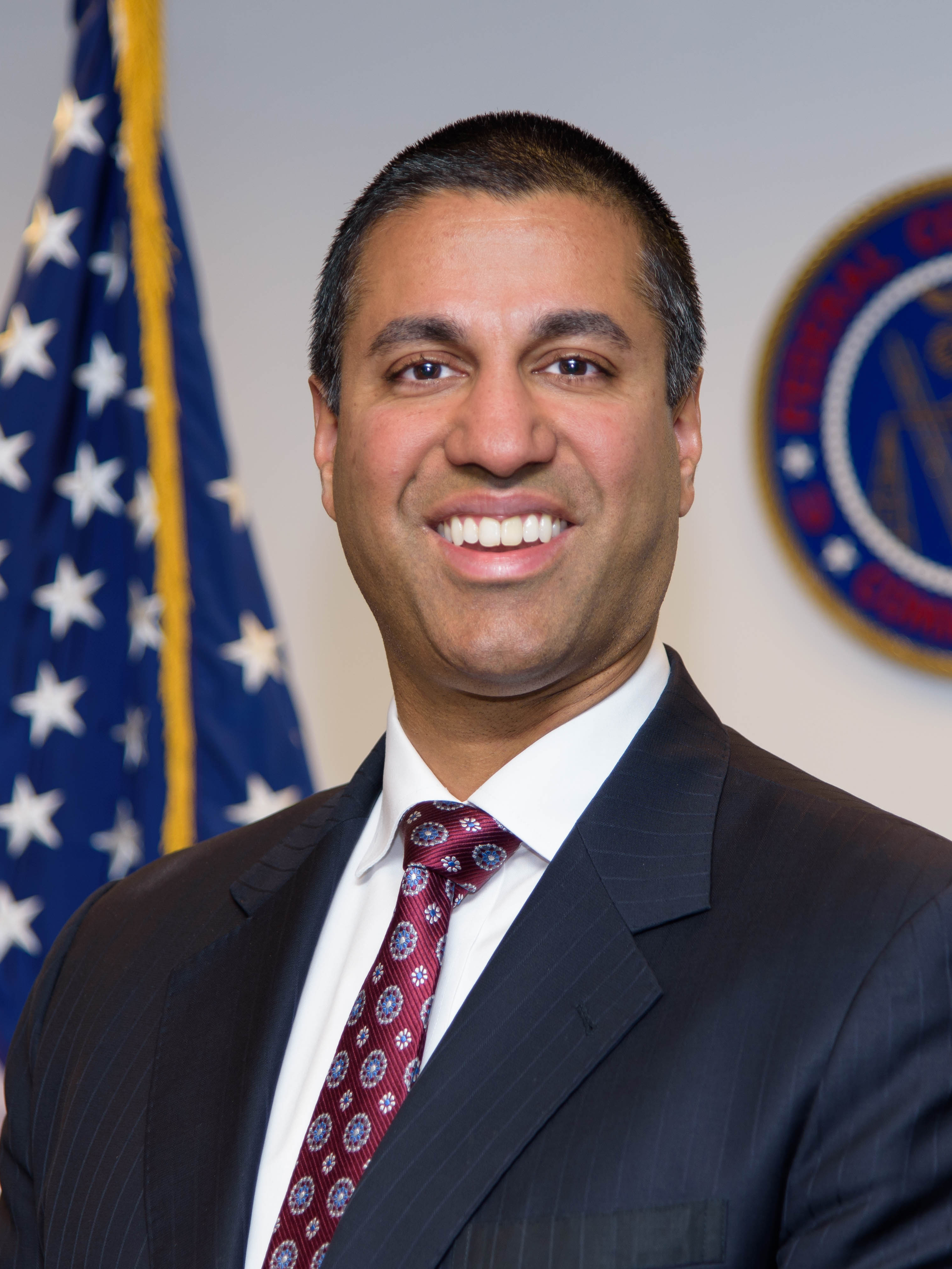
Ajit Pai, Former Chairman of the FCC; Currently serves as a partner at Searchlight Capital

- 2017: Balvir Singh was elected to the Burlington County Board of Chosen Freeholders, New Jersey on November 7, 2017. He became the first Asian-American to win a countywide election in Burlington County and the first Sikh-American to win a countywide election in New Jersey.
- 2019: Seven out of the eight winners of the Scripps National Spelling Bee (Saketh Sundar, Abhijay Kodali, Shruthika Padhy, Sohum Sukhatankar, Christopher Serrao, Rohan Raja, and Rishik Gandhasri), are Indian Americans. They have broken the spelling bee according to several experts and have dominated this American institution.
- 2019: Lilly Singh became the first person of Indian descent to host an American major broadcast network late-night talk show A Little Late with Lilly Singh.

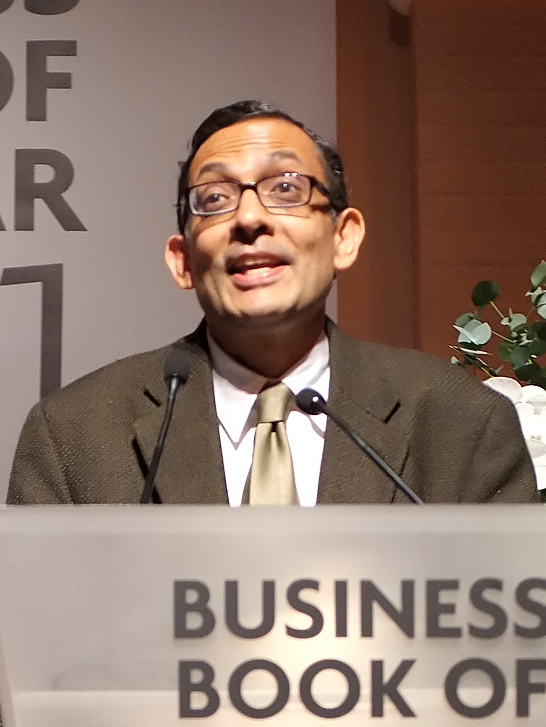
Abhijit Banerjee is awarded the Nobel Memorial Prize in Economic Sciences

- 2019: Abhijit Banerjee is awarded the Nobel Memorial Prize in Economic Sciences.
- 2020: Arvind Krishna appointed as the CEO of IBM.
- 2021: Kamala Harris, born to an Indian mother, became the first woman and first Indian origin Vice President of the United States.
- 2021: Anirudh Devgan appointed as the CEO and President of Cadence Design Systems.
- 2021: Parag Agrawal appointed as the CEO of Twitter.
- 2022: Laxman Narasimhan appointed CEO of Starbucks.
- 2022: Shruti Miyashiro appointed as the president and CEO of Digital Federal Credit Union (DCU).
- 2022: Aruna Miller elected the first Asian-American lieutenant governor of Maryland and first South Asian woman elected lieutenant governor in the U.S.
- 2023: Neal Mohan was appointed as the fourth CEO of YouTube.
- 2023: The World Bank elects Ajay Banga as president.
- 2025: Kash Patel is appointed 9th Director of the Federal Bureau of Investigation
- 2025: Trump installs Sriram Krishnan as Senior White House Policy Advisor on Artificial Intelligence (AI)
- 2025: Trump nominates Harmeet Dhillon for Assistant Attorney General for Civil Rights
- 2025: Usha Vance, wife of Vice President JD Vance, becomes Second Lady
- 2025: Trump elects Jay Bhattacharya to be Director of the National Institutes of Health (NIH)
- 2025: Raja Kumari became the first person of Indian descent to win an American Music Award.

=== Classification ===
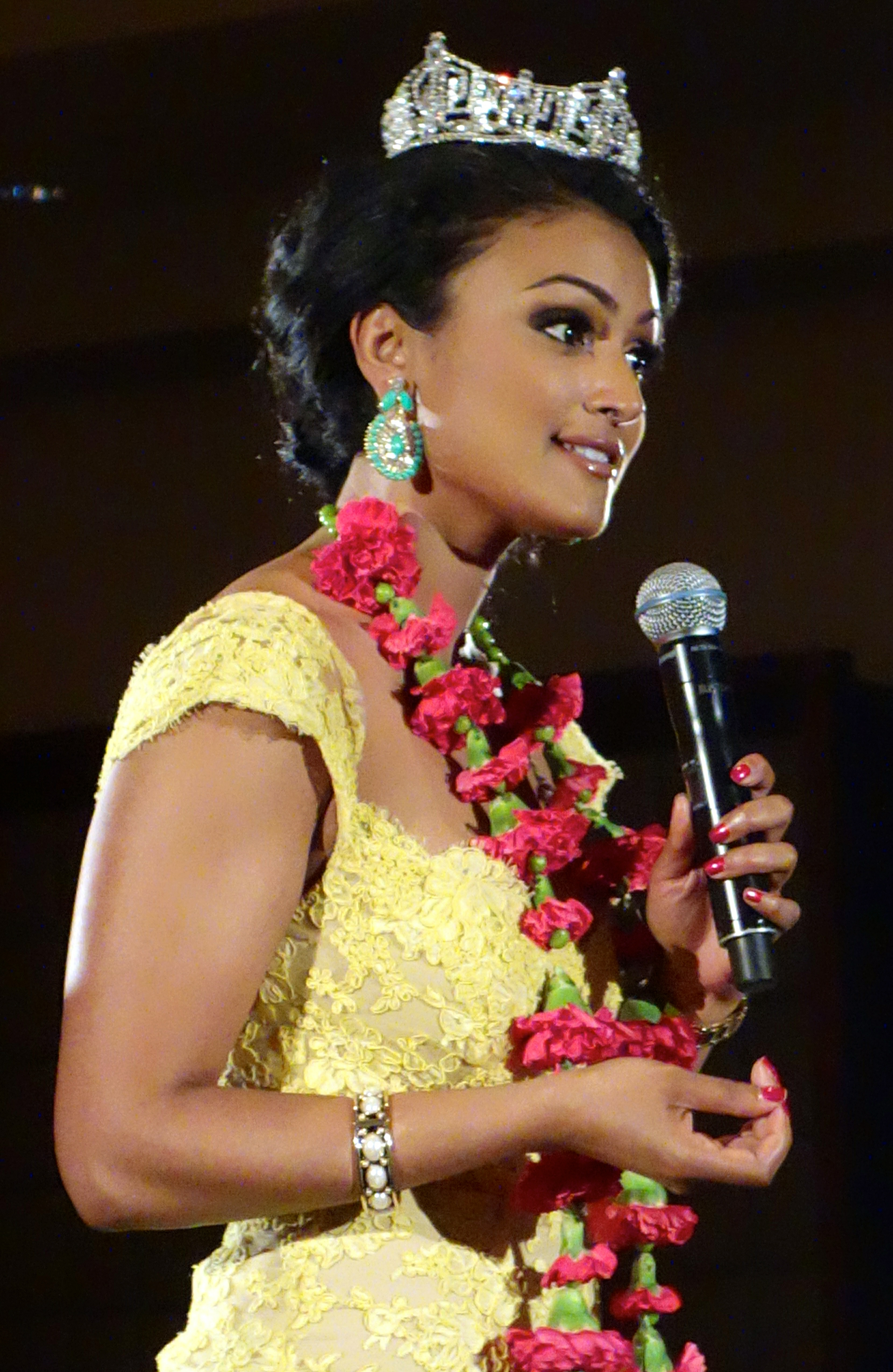
Nina Davuluri, Miss America 2014

According to the official U.S. racial categories employed by the United States Census Bureau, Office of Management and Budget and other U.S. government agencies, American citizens or resident aliens who marked "Asian Indian" as their ancestry or wrote in a term that was automatically classified as an Asian Indian became classified as part of the Asian race at the 2000 Census. As with other modern official U.S. government racial categories, the term "Asian" is in itself a broad and heterogeneous classification, encompassing all peoples with origins in the original peoples of the Far East, Southeast Asia, and the Indian subcontinent.

In previous decades, Indian Americans were also variously classified as White American, the "Hindu race", and "other". Even today, where individual Indian Americans do not racially self-identify, and instead report Muslim, Jewish, and Zoroastrian as their "race" in the "some other race" section without noting their country of origin, they are automatically tallied as white. This may result in the counting of persons such as Indian Muslims, Indian Jews, and Indian Zoroastrians as white, if they solely report their religious heritage without their national origin.

== Current issues ==
=== Discrimination ===
In the 1980s, a gang known as the Dotbusters specifically targeted Indian Americans in Jersey City, New Jersey with violence and harassment. Studies of racial discrimination, as well as stereotyping and scapegoating of Indian Americans have been conducted in recent years. In particular, racial discrimination against Indian Americans in the workplace has been correlated with Indophobia due to the rise in outsourcing/offshoring, whereby Indian Americans are blamed for U.S. companies offshoring white-collar labor to India. According to the offices of the Congressional Caucus on India, many Indian Americans are severely concerned of a backlash, though nothing serious has taken place. Due to various socio-cultural reasons, implicit racial discrimination against Indian Americans largely go unreported by the Indian American community.

Numerous cases of religious stereotyping of American Hindus (mainly of Indian origin) have also been documented.

Since the September 11, 2001 attacks, there have been scattered incidents of Indian Americans becoming mistaken targets for hate crimes. In one example, a Sikh, Balbir Singh Sodhi, was murdered at a Phoenix gas station by a white supremacist. This happened after September 11, and the murderer claimed that his turban made him think that the victim was a Middle Eastern American. In another example, a pizza deliverer was mugged and beaten in Massachusetts for "being Muslim" though the victim pleaded with the assailants that he was in fact a Hindu. In December 2012, an Indian American in New York City was pushed from behind onto the tracks at the 40th Street-Lowery Street station in Sunnyside and killed. The police arrested a woman, Erika Menendez, who admitted to the act and justified it, stating that she shoved him onto the tracks because she believed he was "a Hindu or a Muslim" and she wanted to retaliate for the attacks of September 11, 2001.

In 2004, New York Senator Hillary Clinton joked at a fundraising event with South Asians for Nancy Farmer that Mahatma Gandhi owned a gas station in downtown St. Louis, fueling the stereotype that gas stations are owned by Indians and other South Asians. She clarified in the speech later that she was just joking, but still received some criticism for the statement later on for which she apologized again.

On April 5, 2006, the Hindu Mandir of Minnesota was vandalized allegedly on the basis of religious discrimination. The vandals damaged temple property leading to $200,000 worth of damage.

On August 11, 2006, Senator George Allen allegedly referred to an opponent's political staffer of Indian ancestry as "macaca" and commenting, "Welcome to America, to the real world of Virginia." Some members of the Indian American community saw Allen's comments, and the backlash that may have contributed to Allen losing his re-election bid, as demonstrative of the power of YouTube in the 21st century.

In 2006, then Delaware Senator and future U.S. President Joe Biden was caught on microphone saying: "In Delaware, the largest growth in population is Indian Americans moving from India. You cannot go to a 7-Eleven or a Dunkin' Donuts unless you have a slight Indian accent. I'm not joking."

On August 5, 2012, white supremacist Wade Michael Page shot eight people and killed six at a Sikh gurdwara in Oak Creek, Wisconsin.

On February 22, 2017, recent immigrants Srinivas Kuchibhotla and Alok Madasani were shot at a bar in Olathe, Kansas by Adam Purinton, a white American who mistook them for persons of Middle Eastern descent, yelling "get out of my country" and "terrorist". Kuchibhotla died instantly while Madasani was injured, but later recovered.

Punjabi Sikh Americans in Indianapolis suffered many losses in their community on April 15, 2021, during the Indianapolis FedEx shooting in which gunman Brandon Scott Hole, with a currently unknown motive, entered a FedEx warehouse and killed eight people, half of whom were Sikh. The Sikh victims were Jaswinder Singh, Jasvinder Kaur, Amarjit Sekhon, and Amarjeet Johal. 90% of the workers at the facility were Sikh according to some accounts. Another Sikh, Taptejdeep Singh, was one of the nine people killed in the San Jose shooting on May 26, 2021.

On October 11, 2026, 19-year old Alexandros Paporakis was arrested for making a terrorist threat in Aurora, Illinois. Court documents report that he "specifically targeted people of Indian descent at a Hindu house of worship." He is charged with making a terrorist threat and unlawful possession of a weapon. Raja Krishnamoorthi, a Democrat representative from Illinois, condemned the event and called for greater resources to fight extremism.

=== Immigration ===
Indians are among the largest ethnic groups legally immigrating to the United States. The immigration of Indians has taken place in several waves since the first Indian moved to the United States in the 1700s. A major wave of immigration to California from the region of Punjab took place in the first decade of the 20th century. Another significant wave followed in the 1950s which mainly included students and professionals. The elimination of immigration quotas in 1965 spurred successively larger waves of immigrants in the late 1970s and early 1980s. With the technology boom of the 1990s, the largest influx of Indians arrived between 1995 and 2000. This latter group has also caused surge in the application for various immigration benefits including applications for green card. This has resulted in long waiting periods for people born in India from receiving these benefits.

As of 2012, over 330,000 Indians were on the visa wait list, third only to Mexico and The Philippines.

In December 2015, over 30 Indian students seeking admission in two U.S. universities—Silicon Valley University and the Northwestern Polytechnic University—were denied entry by Customs and Border Protection and were deported to India. Conflicting reports suggested that the students were deported because of the controversies surrounding the above-mentioned two universities. However, another report suggested that the students were deported as they had provided conflicting information at the time of their arrival in the U.S. to what was mentioned in their visa application. "According to the U.S. Government, the deported persons had presented information to the border patrol agent which was inconsistent with their visa status," read an advisory published by Ministry of External Affairs (India) which was published in the Hindustan Times.

Following the incident, the Indian government asked the U.S. government to honor the visas given by its embassies and consulates. In response, the United States embassy advised the students considering studying in the U.S. to seek assistance from Education USA.

=== Citizenship ===
Unlike many countries, India does not allow dual citizenship. Consequently, many Indian citizens residing in U.S., who do not want to lose their Indian nationality, do not apply for American citizenship (ex. Raghuram Rajan). However, many Indian Americans obtain Overseas Citizenship of India (OCI) status, which allows them to live and work in India indefinitely.

=== Marriage ===
Arranged marriages and relationships have been a common cultural tradition in many South Asian cultures, particularly among Indian communities. Arranged marriages and relationships can take many different forms, and that the experiences of those involved can vary greatly depending on a variety of circumstances, including cultural background, familial values, and individual preferences. Although many individuals marry each other out of love for one another, long-term compatibility—rather than love—is frequently prioritized in these arranged marriages. A number of variables could be important in the selecting process, including caste, education, financial standing, and family values. The public's perception of arranged marriages is changing, particularly among younger people. In an effort to strike a balance between family participation and personal preference, some people may decide to combine aspects of both love and planned marriages.

==== Intermarriage patterns ====
Indian Americans exhibit relatively low rates of intermarriage compared to other major Asian American ethnic groups. According to 2011 data, which draws on U.S. census statistics and related studies, a significant majority of Indian Americans marry within their own ethnic group, particularly among men. In the "USR + USR Only" category—referring to U.S.-raised individuals (1.5 generation or higher) who marry others of similar generational background—only 25.6% of Indian American men married White women, while 37.8% of Indian American women married White men. This indicates that Indian American women are more likely to marry White partners than their male counterparts within this cohort. Overall, 62.4% of Indian American men and 52.0% of Indian American women married other Indian Americans in the "USR + USR Only" group.

These rates are among the highest levels of same-ethnicity marriage in the Asian American population, surpassed only by Vietnamese and Korean American men. This intermarriage pattern may reflect cultural preferences for endogamy, community influence, or gendered dynamics in identity formation and partner selection in immigrant communities.

=== Income disparities ===
Although Indian Americans have the highest average and median household income of any demographic group in America, there exist significant and severe income disparities among various communities of Indian Americans. On Long Island, the average family income of Indian Americans was roughly $273,000, while in Fresno, the average family income of Indian Americans was only $24,000, an eleven-fold difference.

=== Illegal immigration ===
In 2009, the Department of Homeland Security estimated that there were 200,000 Indian unauthorized immigrants; they are the sixth largest nationality (tied with Koreans) of illegal immigrants behind Mexico, El Salvador, Guatemala, Honduras, and the Philippines. In the same year, The Economic Times remarked that Indian Americans had "the dubious distinction of being fastest-growing group of illegal immigrants in the country", and noted that the 270,000 unauthorized Indians in the country represented a 125% increase since 2000. In 2014, Pew Research Center estimated that there are 450,000 undocumented Indians in the United States. In 2023, Pew Research Center estimated that there were 725,000 illegal immigrants of Indian origin living in the US.

== Politics ==
Several groups have tried to create a voice for Indian Americans in political affairs, including the United States India Political Action Committee and the Indian American Leadership Initiative, as well as pan-ethnic groups such as South Asian Americans Leading Together and Desis Rising Up and Moving. Additionally, there are industry groups such as the Asian American Hotel Owners Association and the American Association of Physicians of Indian Origin.

In the 2000s, a majority of Indian Americans have tended to identify as moderates, and have often leaned Democratic in several recent elections. In the 2012 presidential election, a poll from the National Asian American Survey reported that 68% of Indian Americans planned to vote for Barack Obama. Polls before the 2004 presidential election showed Indian Americans favoring Democratic candidate John Kerry over Republican George W. Bush by a 53% to 14% margin, with 30% undecided at the time.

By 2004, the Republican party endeavored to target this community for political support, and in 2007, Republican Congressman Bobby Jindal became the first United States Governor of Indian descent when he was elected Governor of Louisiana. In 2010, Nikki Haley, also of Indian descent and a fellow Republican, became Governor of South Carolina in 2010. Republican Neel Kashkari is also of Indian descent and ran for Governor of California in 2014. Raja Krishnamoorthi who is a lawyer, engineer and community leader from Schaumburg, Illinois has been the Congressman representing Illinois's 8th congressional district since 2017.Swati Dandekar was first elected to Iowa state assembly in 2003.Jenifer Rajkumar is a Lower Manhattan district leader and the first Indian American woman elected to the state legislature in New York history. In 2016, Kamala Harris (the daughter of a Tamil Indian American mother, Dr. Shyamala Gopalan Harris, and an Afro-Jamaican American father, Donald Harris) became the first Indian American and second African American female to serve in the U.S. Senate.

In 2020, Harris briefly ran for President of the United States and was later chosen as the Democratic Party's vice-presidential nominee, running alongside Joe Biden. She was the Democratic candidate for president in the 2024 United States presidential election.

In the 2024 United States presidential election, Vivek Ramaswamy ran as a candidate for the Republican Party. Ramaswamy would later leave the race to endorse Donald Trump and was appointed as co-chairperson of the Department of Government Efficiency alongside Elon Musk. He left this role in January 2025 to run as the Republican nominee in the 2026 Ohio gubernatorial election, which he lost to Democratic nominee Amy Acton.

Zohran Kwame Mamdani, a former New York State Assembly member, won the 2025 New York City Democratic mayoral election, and is the first Muslim with Indian origin parents to be the mayor of New York City.

Indian Americans have played a significant role in promoting better India–United States relations, turning the cold attitude of American legislators to a positive perception of India in the post-Cold War era.

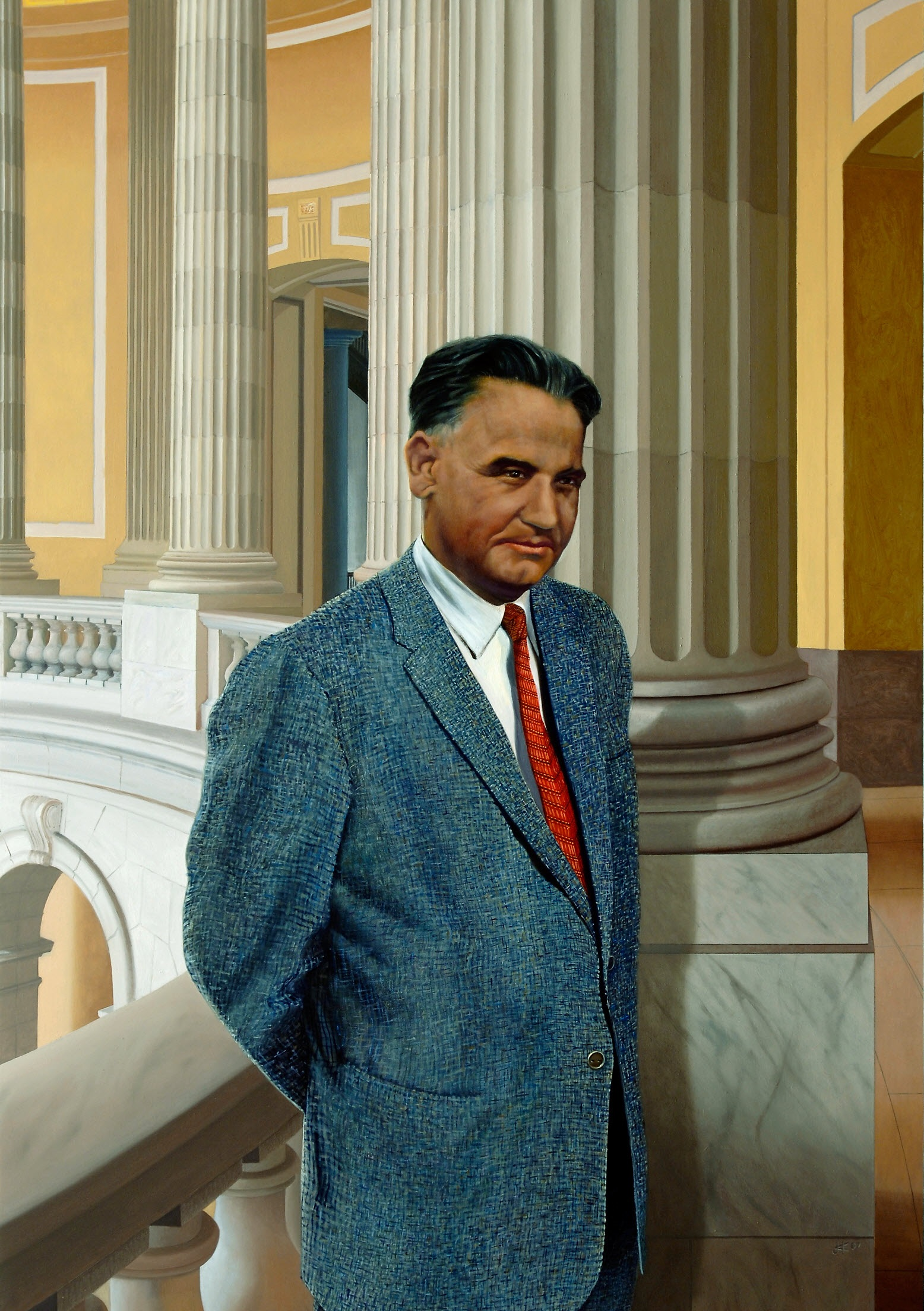
In 1956, Dalip Singh Saund became the first Asian American, Indian American, and member of a non-Abrahamic faith (Sikhism) to be elected to the United States Congress.

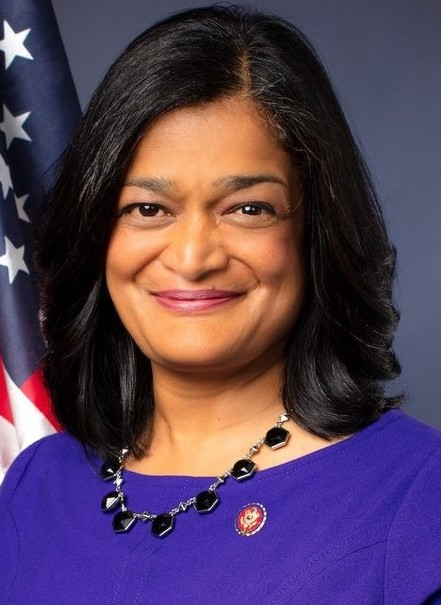
Representative Pramila Jayapal from Washington.

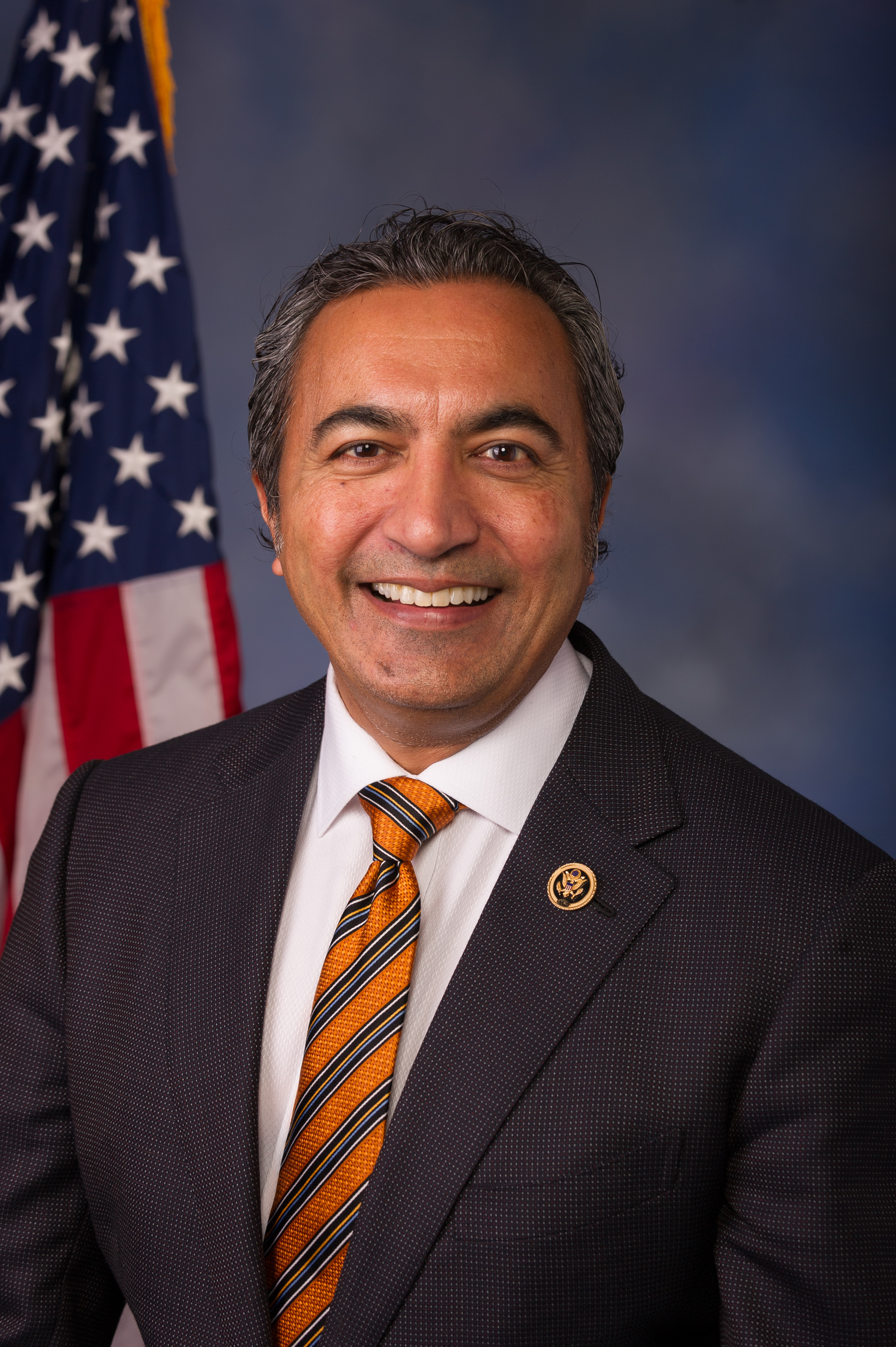
Representative Ami Bera from California.

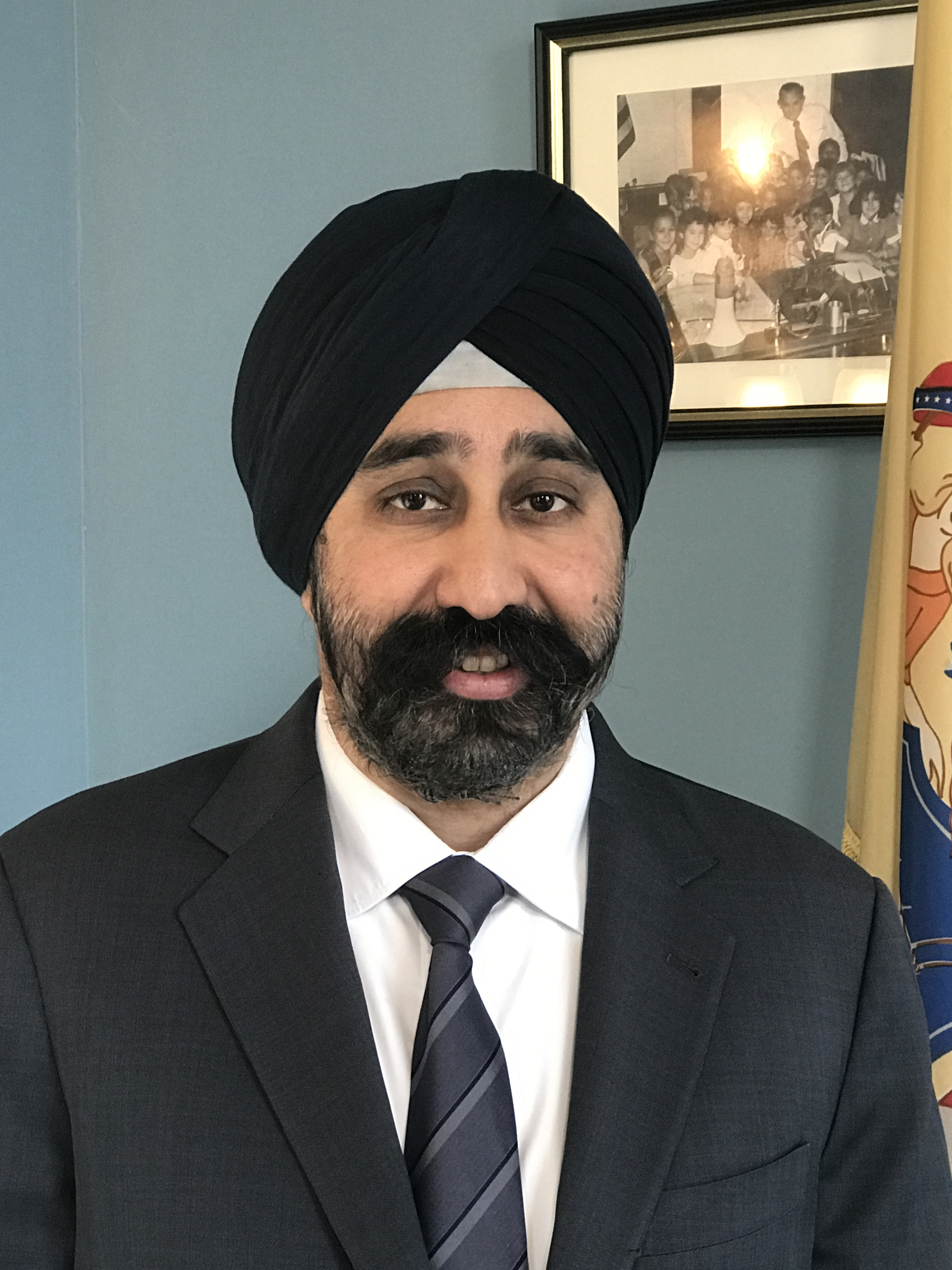
Ravinder Bhalla, New Jersey's 32 legislative District

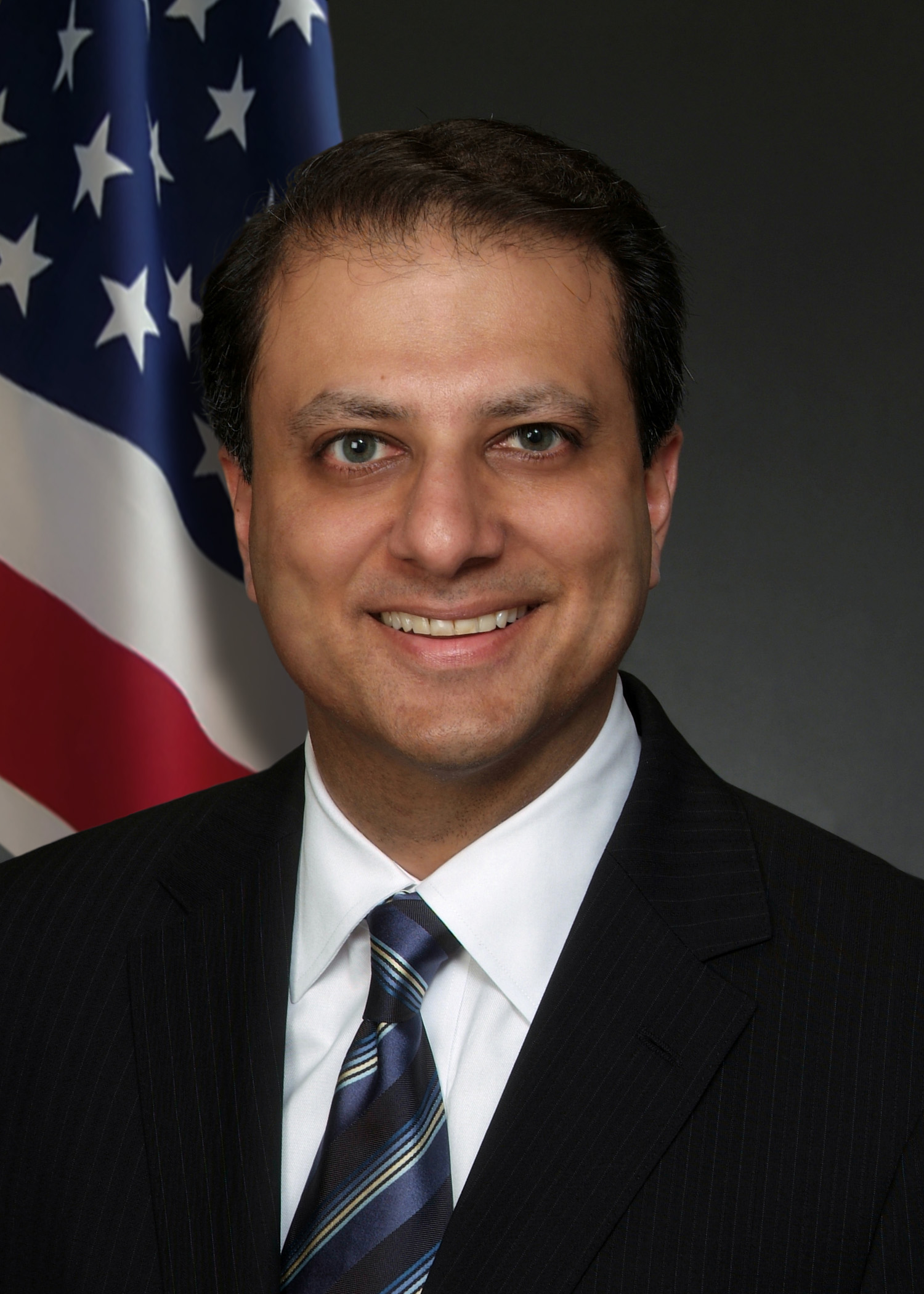
Preet Bharara served as the United States Attorney for the Southern District of New York.

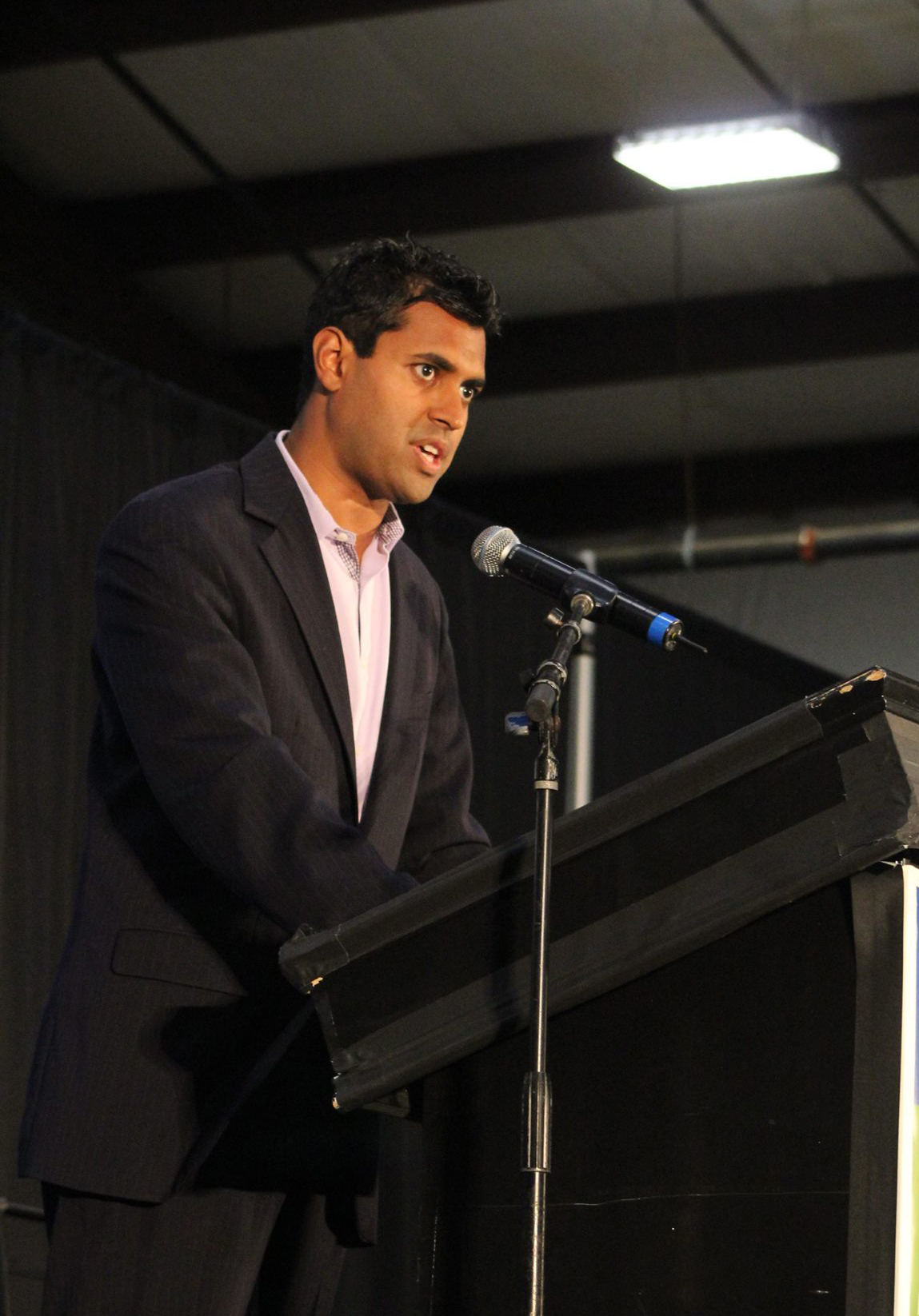
Vin Gopal, New Jersey's 11th legislative district.

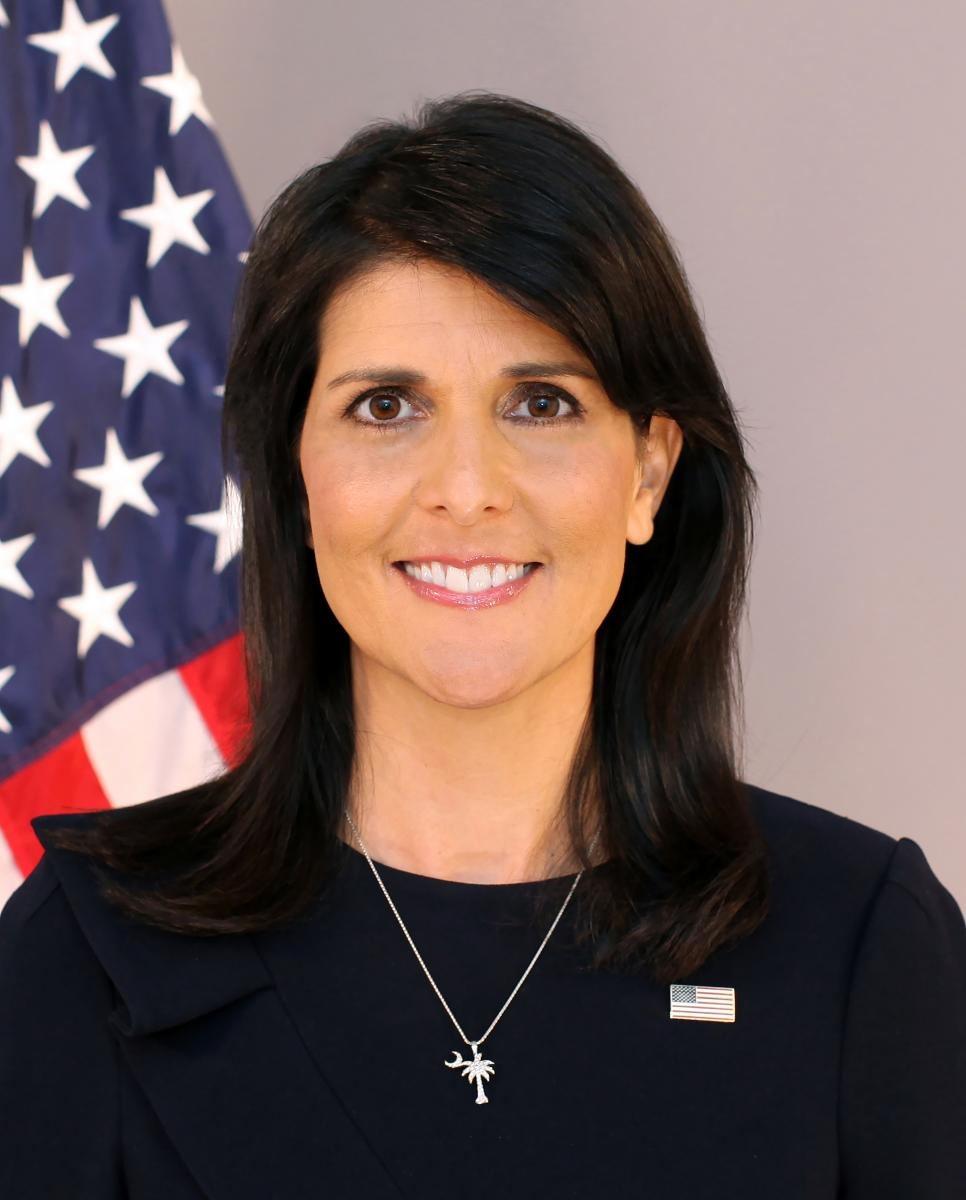
Nikki Haley was the 29th United States Ambassador to the United Nations and 116th Governor of South Carolina.

Kamala Harris was the 49th Vice President of the United States and was the first person of Indian descent elected to the United States Senate.

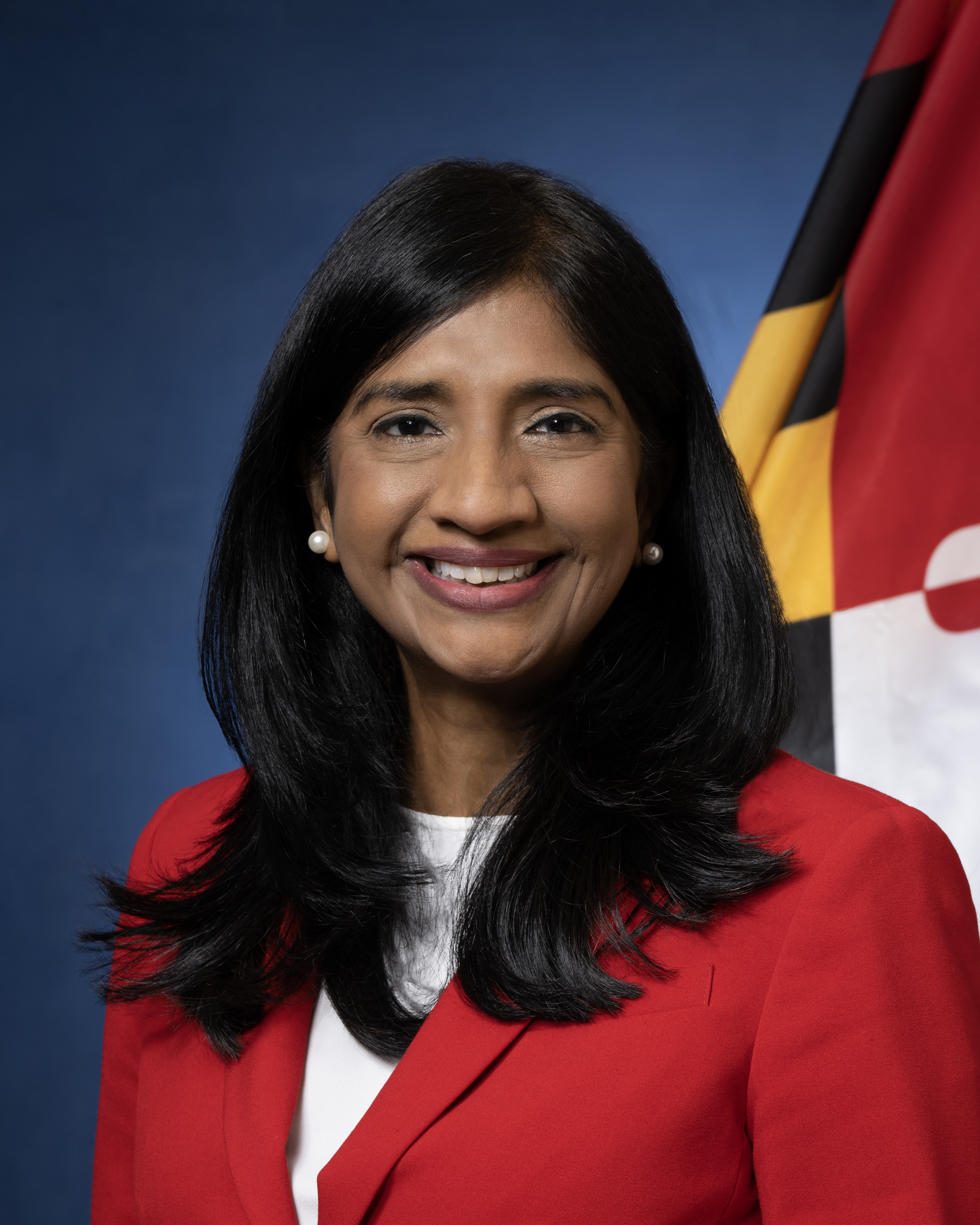
Aruna Miller, 10th Lieutenant Governor of Maryland.

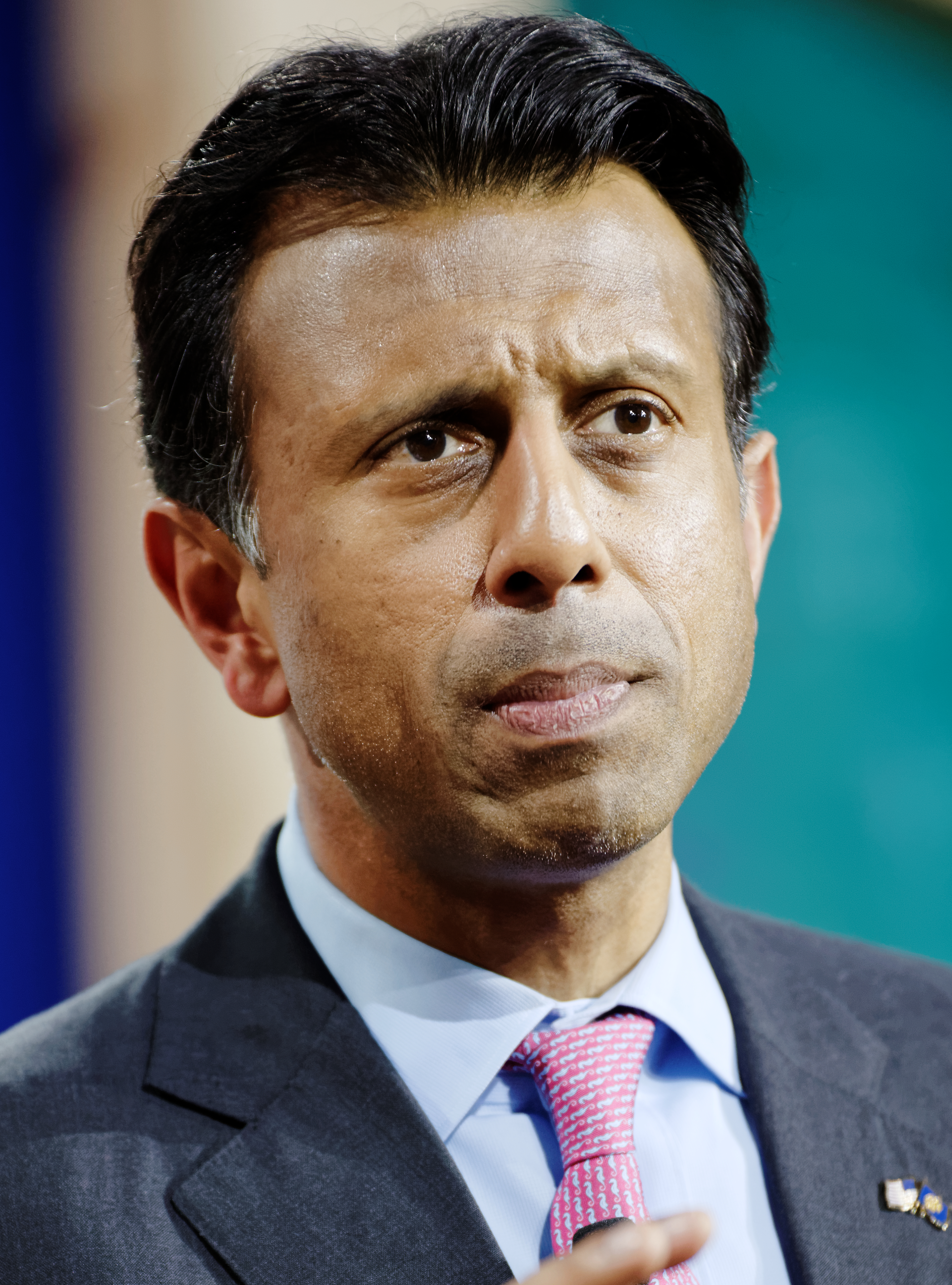
Bobby Jindal was the 58th Governor of Louisiana and a former representative.

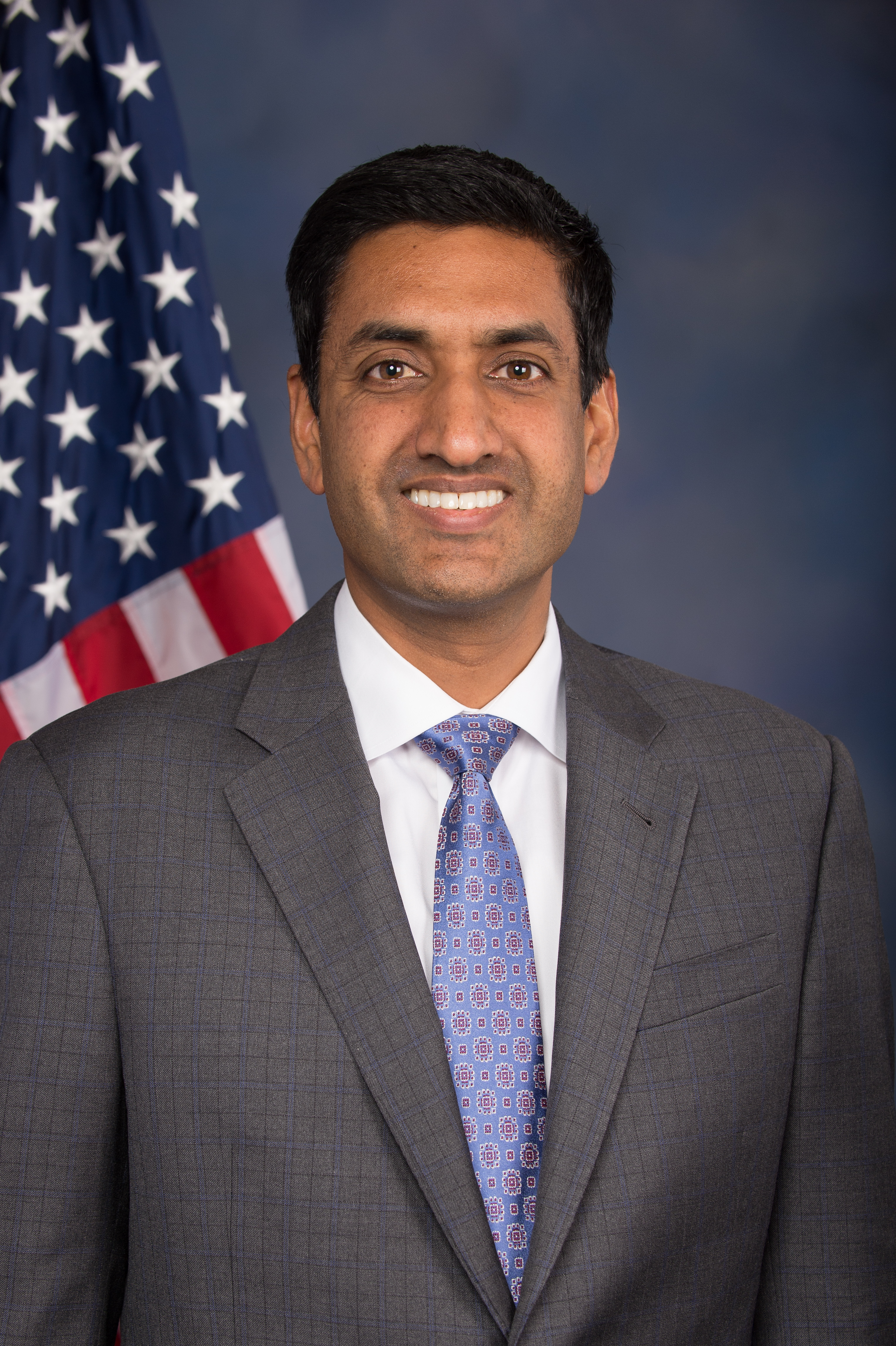
Representative Ro Khanna from California.

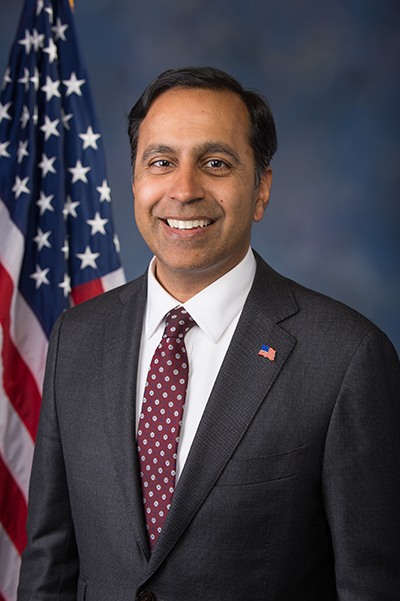
Representative Raja Krishnamoorthi from Illinois.

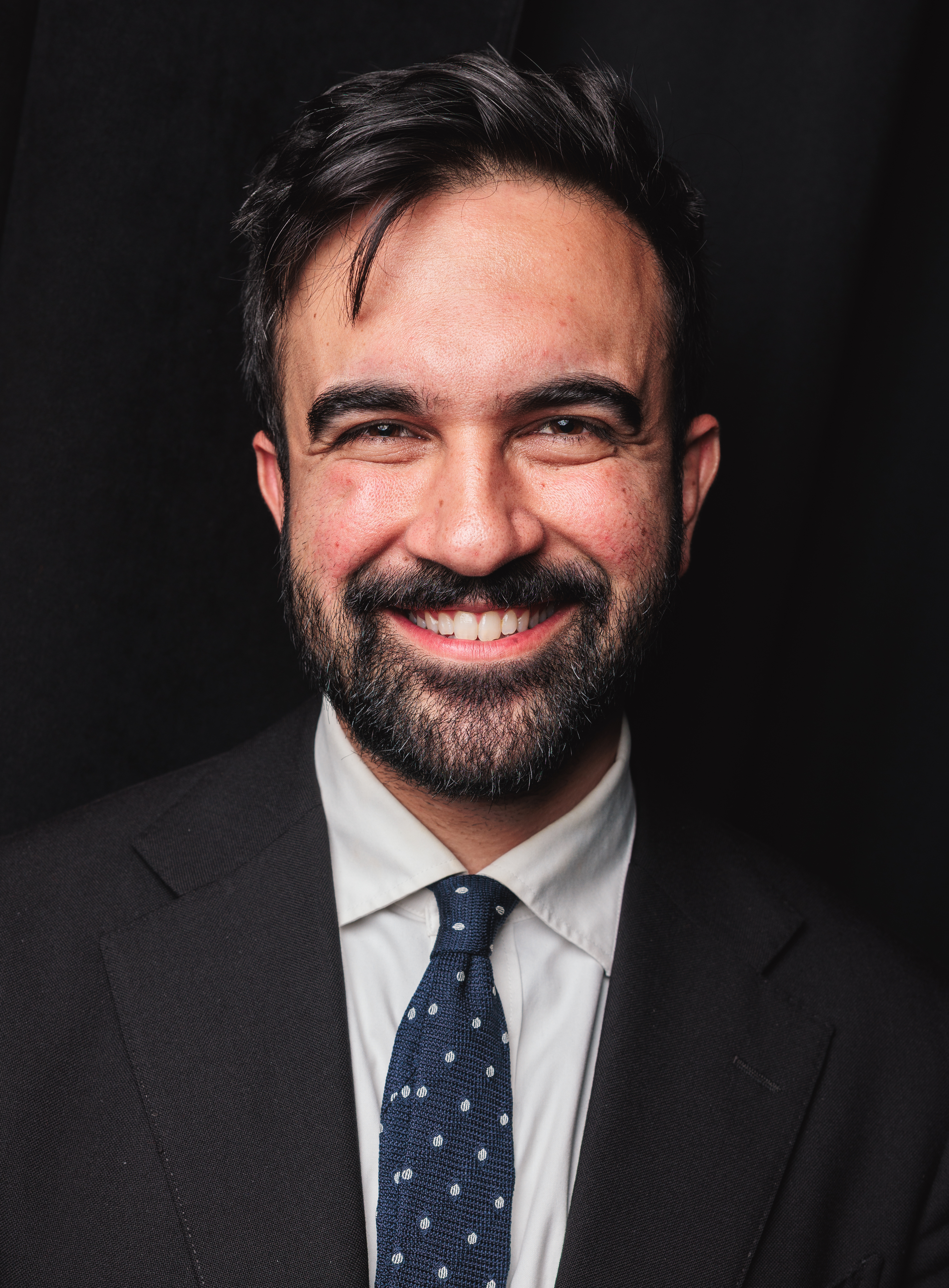
Zohran Mamdani, mayor of New York.

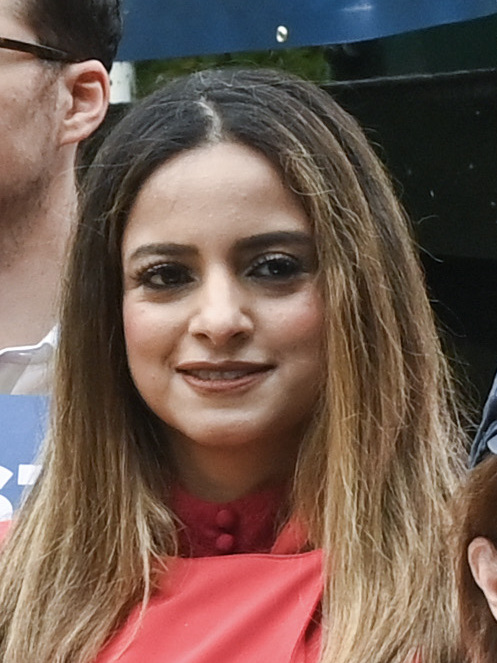
Jenifer Rajkumar, state legislator from New York.

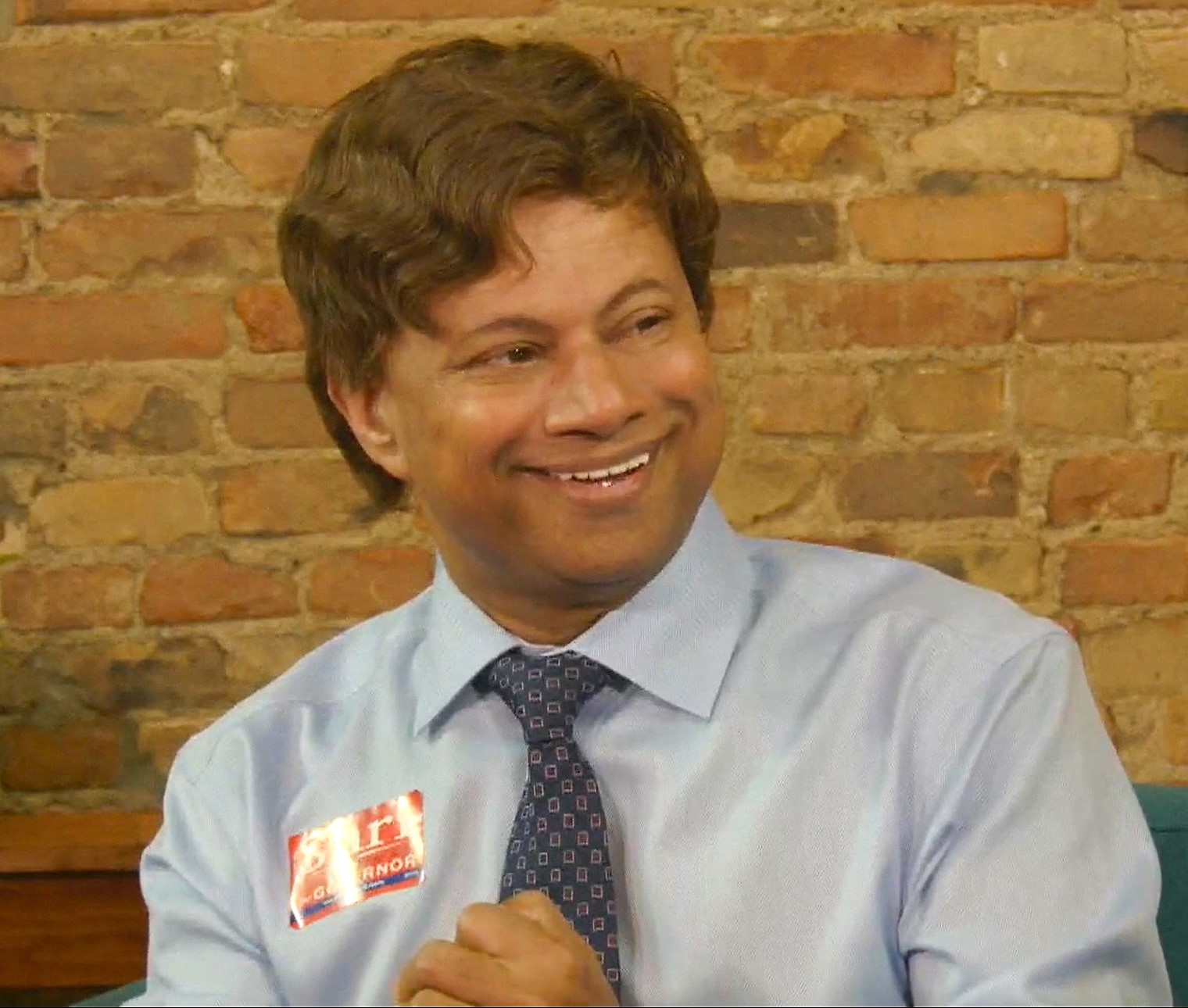
Representative Shri Thanedar from Michigan.

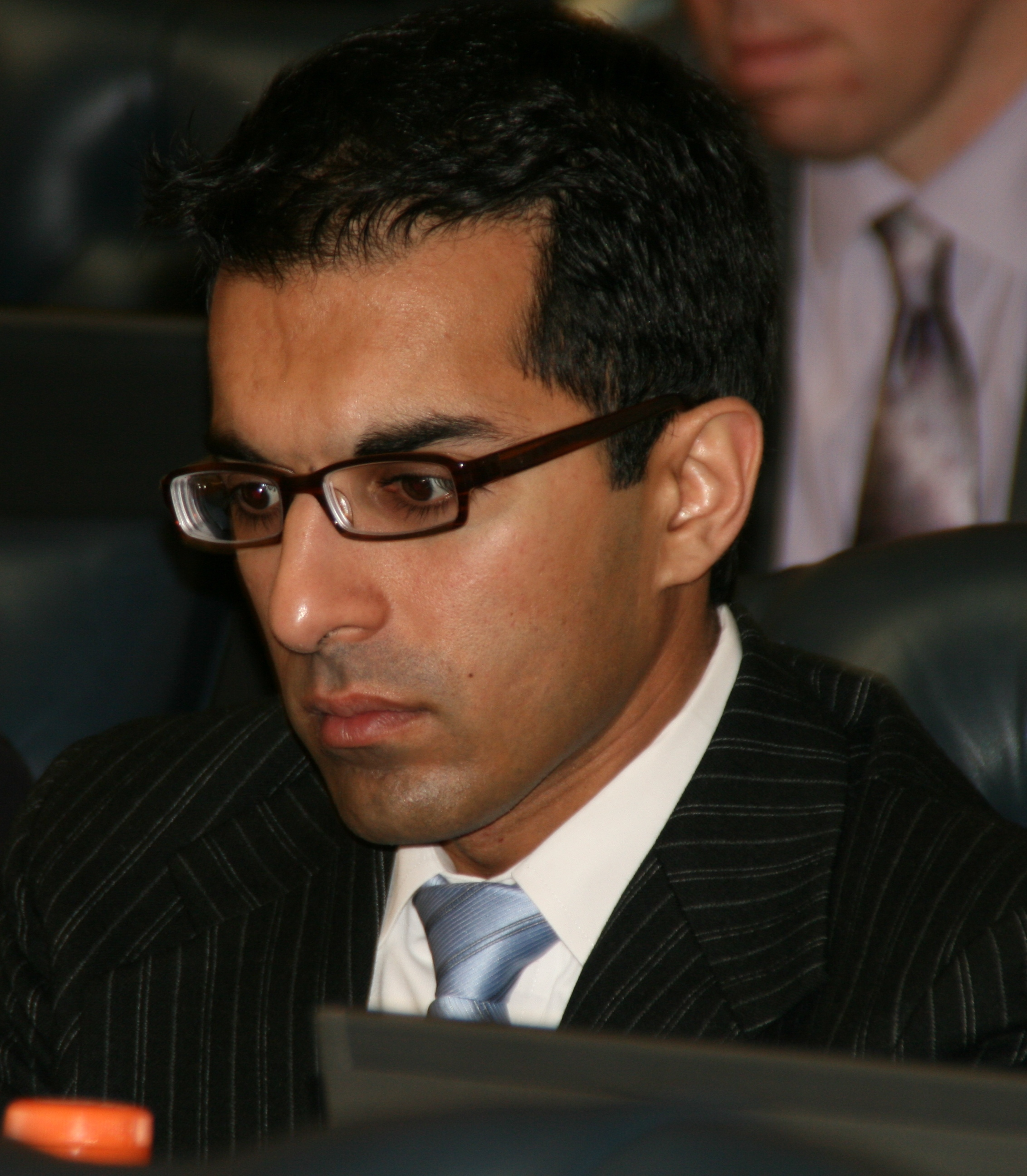
Sam Arora is a former Member of the Maryland House of Delegates.

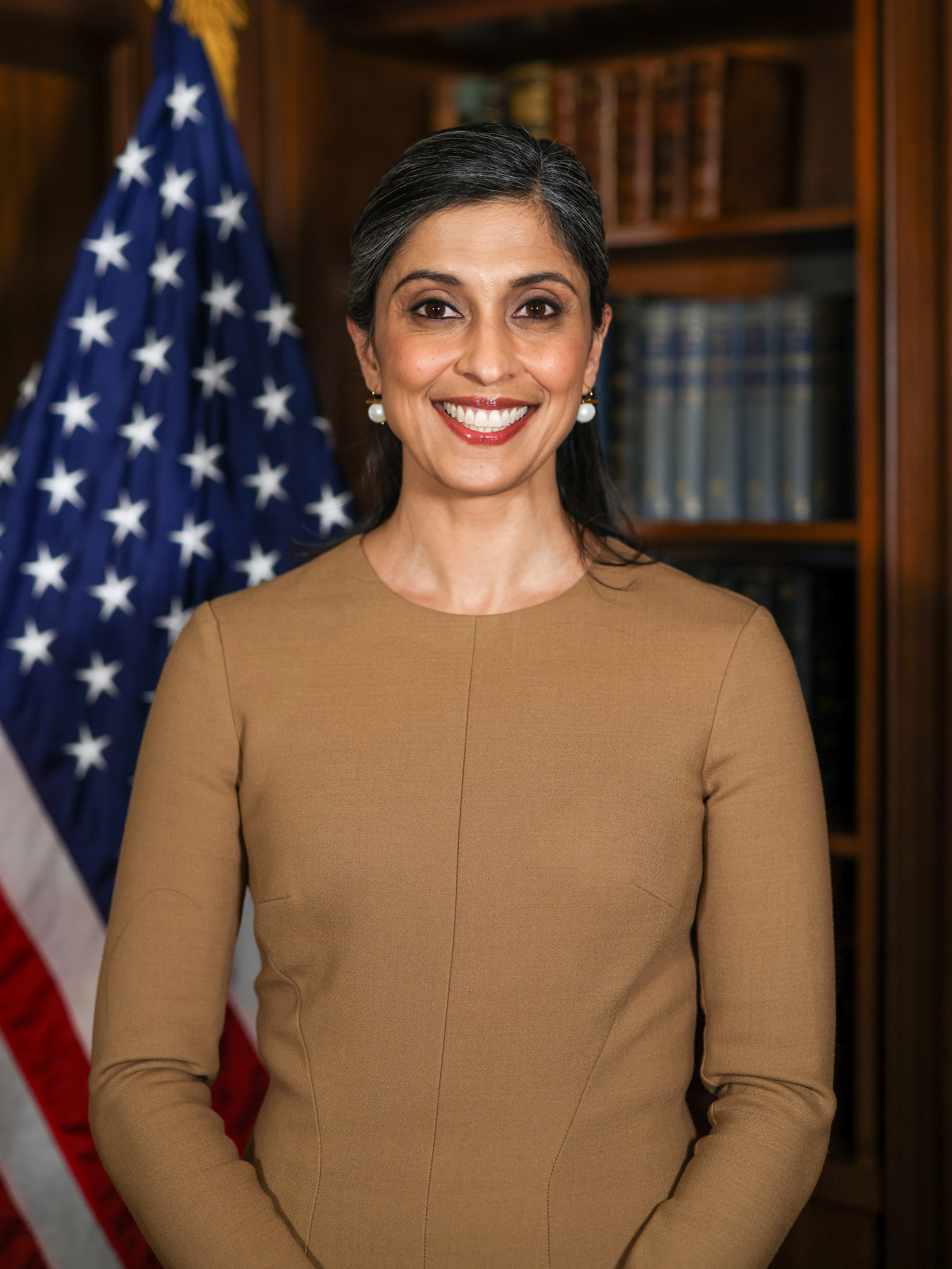
Usha Vance is the current Second Lady of the United States.

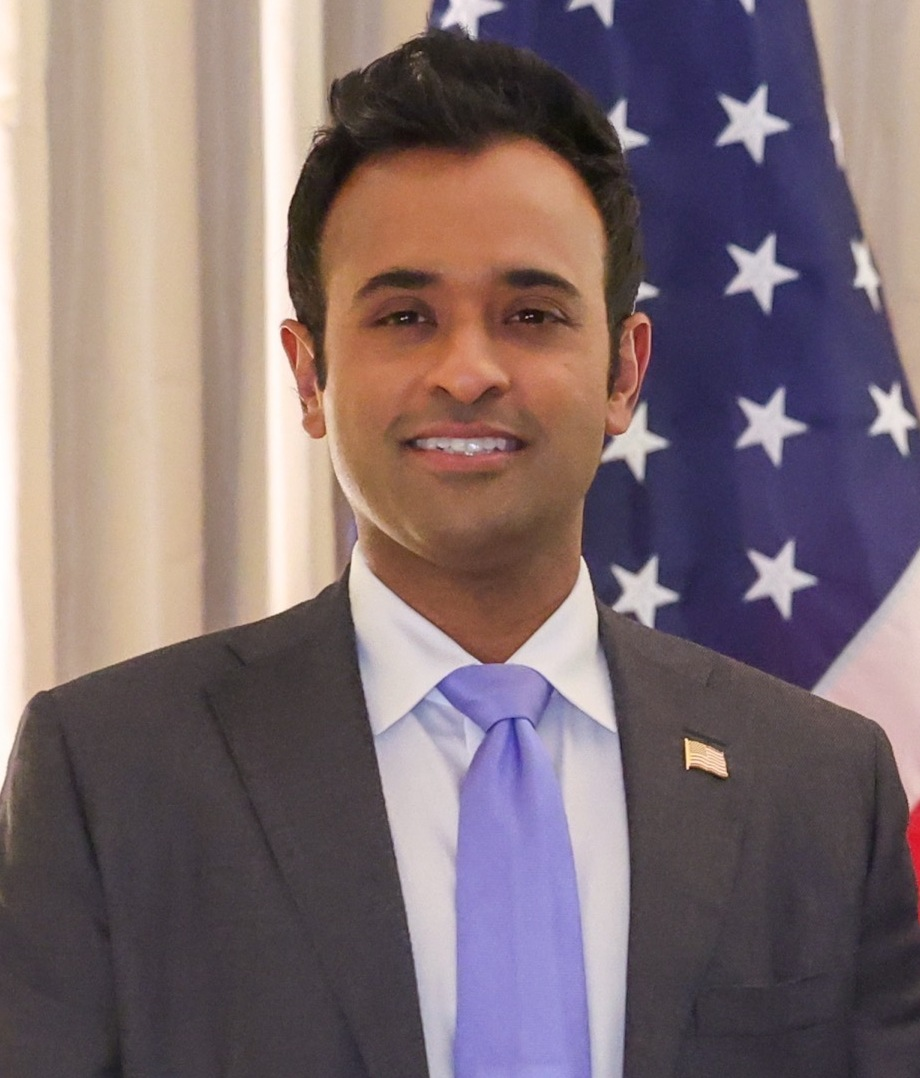
Vivek Ramaswamy campaigned unsuccessfully for the 2026 Ohio gubernatorial election.

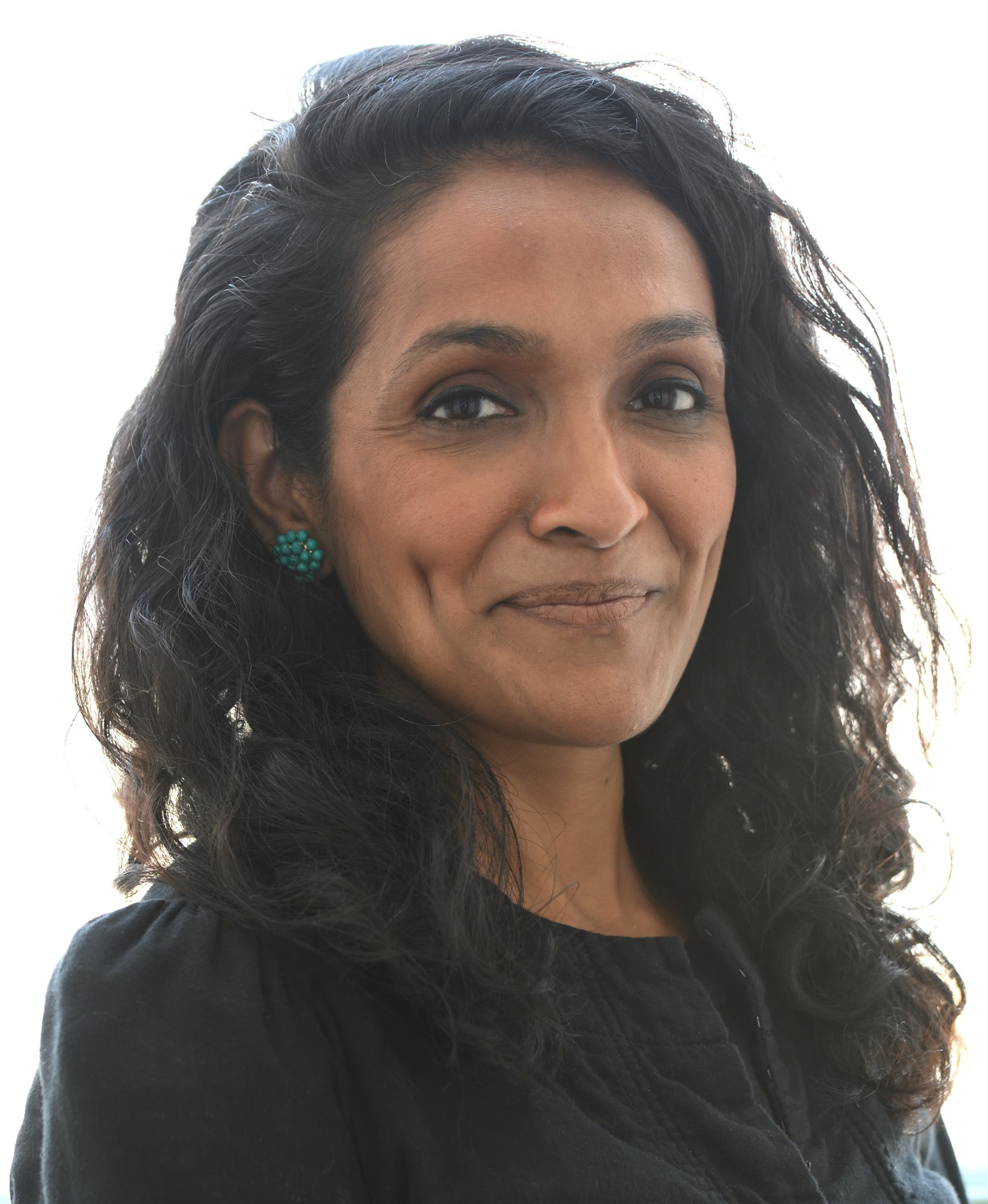
Nithya Raman is the first Indian-American elected mayor of Los Angeles.

== See also ==
- Indians in the New York City metropolitan area
- Indo-Caribbean Americans
- Punjabi Mexican Americans
- South Asian Americans
- Bengali Americans
- Telugu Americans
- India–United States relations
- Indian Canadians
- Indian diaspora
- Racial classification of Indian Americans
- Romani Americans
- Romani diaspora
