= Bengali Americans =

Americans of Bengali birth or descent

মার্কিন বাঙালি Markin Bangali
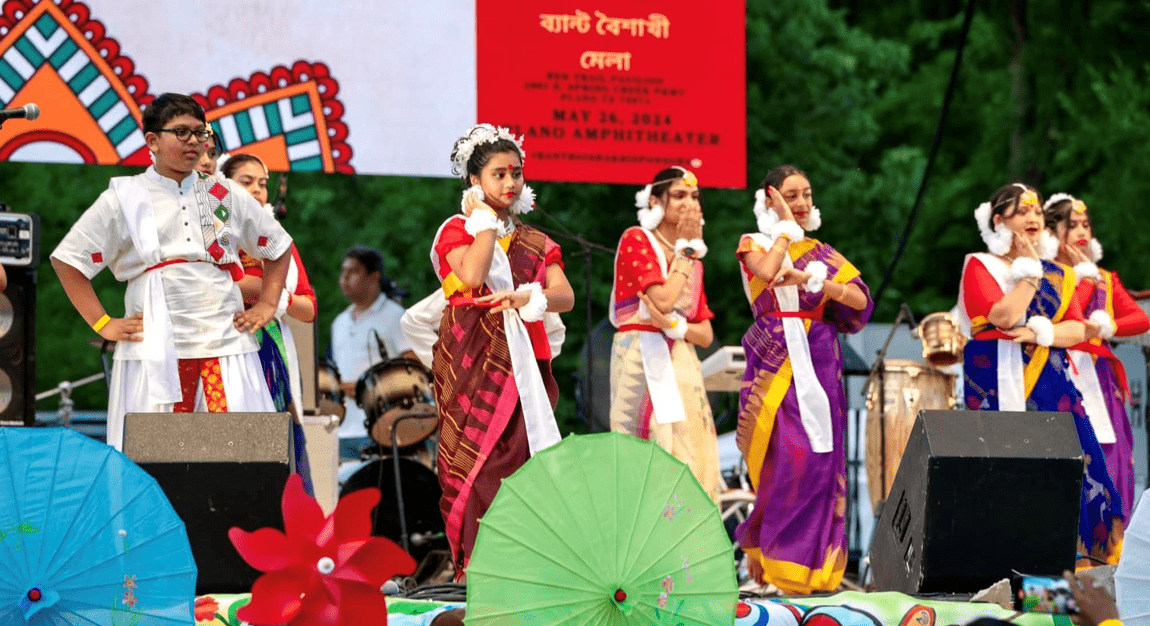
- Pohela Boishakh celebrations in Dallas

Total population
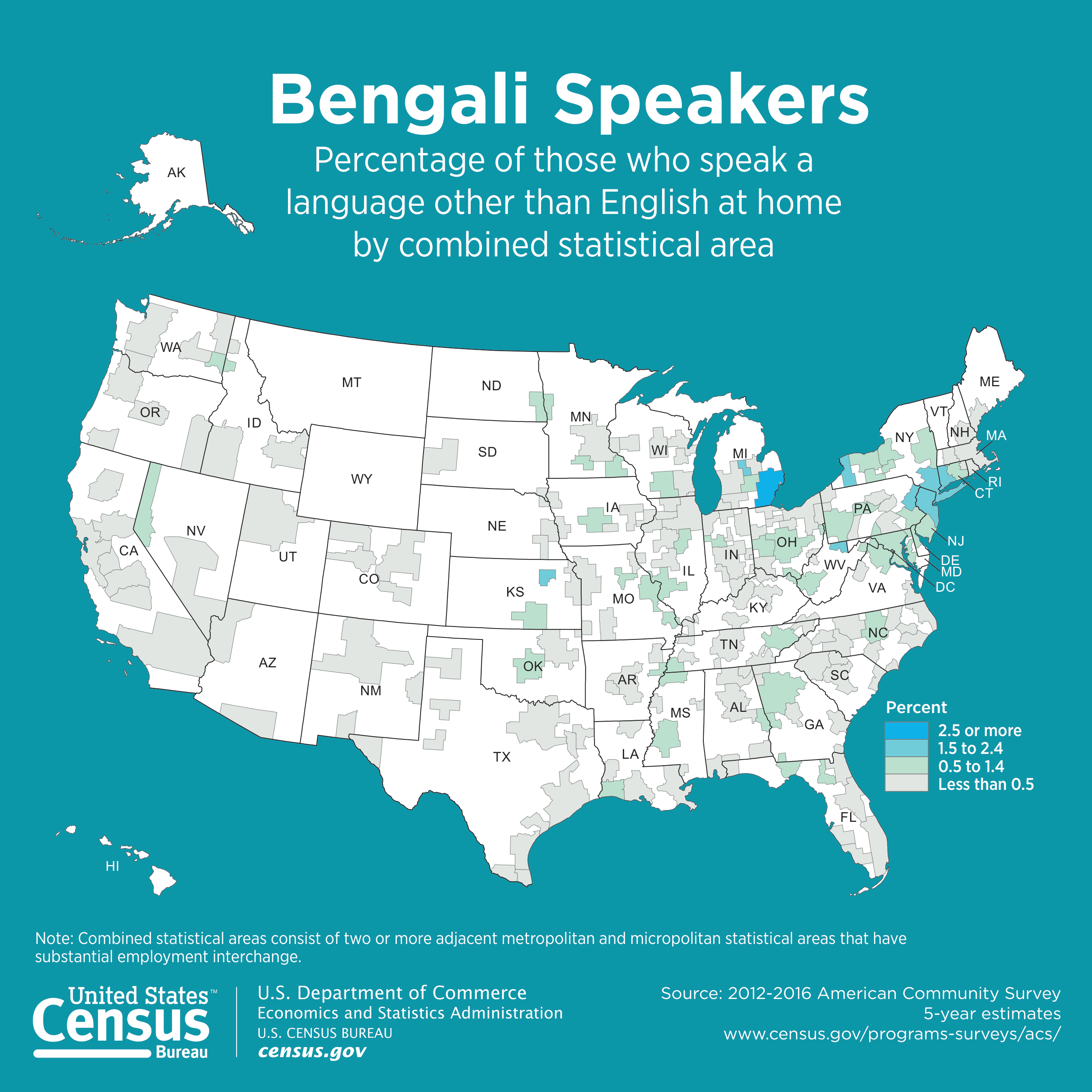
- ▲750,000 (2025 est.) (Note: The estimated number of Bangladeshi Bengali Americans exceeds 600,000. If this represents approximately 80% (Note: The United States is home to over 450,000 Bengalis, with over 350,000 of them originating from Bangladesh. (Note: As of the 2020 United States Census, 333,026 U.S. residents were born in Bangladesh. Including those of Bangladeshi ancestry or ethnicity, the number surpasses 350,000.)) of the total Bengali American population, then the overall estimated population would surpass 750,000. Also, as of 2026, there are approximately 5 million Indian Americans in the United States, of whom around 2–3% are Bengali, amounting to approximately 150,000 people.) ▲453,191 (2020 US Census) Distribution of Bengali speakers in the United States (2012—2016)

Regions with significant populations
- New York City, Boston, Philadelphia, Cleveland, Detroit, Chicago, Milwaukee, Washington, D.C., Atlanta, Miami, Minneapolis, Houston, Dallas, Seattle, Denver, Los Angeles, San Francisco

Languages
- Bengali, English

Religion
- Majority; Islam ~80% Minority; Hinduism: ~18% Buddhism: ~1% Christianity: ~1%

Related ethnic groups
- Bangladeshi Americans, Indian Americans, Nepalese Americans, Tamil Americans, Telugu Americans, Punjabi Americans

Bengali Americans (Bengali: মার্কিন বাঙালি) are American nationals or residents who identify as Bengalis based on their ethnicity, language, and family history. They trace their roots to the historic region of Bengal, which is now split between Bangladesh and West Bengal, India. Bengali Americans also belong to the broader groups of modern-day Bangladeshi Americans and Indian Americans. Demographic census (2020) suggest that around 453,191 people in the United States speak Bengali as their main language or alongside other languages. This makes up about 0.14% of the population. Additionally, there are more than 600,000 non-resident Bangladeshi Bengalis living in the United States. As of 2026, there are approximately 150,000 Indian Bengalis in the United States. (Note: As of 2026, there are approximately 5 million Indian Americans in the United States, of whom around 2–3% are Bengali, amounting to approximately 150,000 people.) New York City has long been the main center for Bengali settlement. By 2025, the city had more than 250,000 Bangladesh-born immigrants living there. The number increases further when Bengalis originating from India are included. Since the 1970s, New York has become a key destination for Bengali immigrants. In terms of population, after Bangladesh, India, and Pakistan, the United States is the fourth country where Bengalis have established permanent settlements and have either acquired citizenship or are in the process of applying for it. (Note: Check the “Regions with significant populations” section in the infobox of the Bengalis article. Although Saudi Arabia, the United Arab Emirates, and Malaysia have more numerous Bengali populations than the United States, those Bengalis have gone there primarily for work. They generally cannot obtain citizenship there.)

The United States is home to over 450,000 Bengalis, with more than 350,000 originating from Bangladesh. (2020 US Census)
1. Bangladesh or Bangladeshi origin (80.0%)
2. India or Indian origin (20.0%)

== Immigration ==
Available historical records indicate that immigration from Bengal to the United States began in the late nineteenth century. Over subsequent decades, individuals of Bengali origin arrived in diverse occupational and social contexts, including as textile traders, maritime workers who remained ashore after their vessels arrived, and, in later periods, as professionals with formal education.

=== First phase (1881–1947) ===
Documented evidence indicates that Bengalis arrived in the United States in the 1880s. This period is commonly described in historical accounts as an early phase of Bengali immigration. During this time, migration occurred primarily through two occupational groups: silk traders, commonly known as chikondars, and maritime workers, known as lascars.

==== Chikondars from Hooghly and the expansion of the silk trade ====
In the mid-1880s, a group of Bengali Muslim traders from the Hooghly district of undivided Bengal (now in West Bengal) arrived at the ports of New York and Baltimore. Contemporary accounts describe them as dealing in silk textiles, including embroidered shawls, tablecloths, and cushion covers. The embroidery style associated with these goods was known in Bengal as chikan (or chikkan), and vendors engaged in this trade were referred to in American sources as chikondars.

Contemporary sources indicate that, during this period, certain categories of imported goods described at the time as “Oriental” attracted consumer interest in the United States. Within this commercial context, Bengali chikondars established trading activities along the New Jersey shoreline, including resort towns such as Asbury Park, Atlantic City, and Long Branch. Seasonal patterns of commerce are documented, with trading activity concentrated in northeastern resort areas during the summer months and shifting southward during the winter. Over time, New Orleans emerged as a central hub in this trade network. Contemporary newspaper reports document the presence of these traders in areas such as the French Market and Canal Street.

By 1910, contemporary records indicate that at least 50 Bengali merchants had established residences in the Tremé neighborhood of New Orleans. Silk textiles imported through these trading networks were used in local cultural events, including Mardi Gras celebrations. During the 1930s, this commercial activity diminished amid broader economic disruptions associated with the Great Depression and changes in textile production methods. These developments marked the decline of this early phase of Bengali commercial activity in the United States.

==== Lascars and the settlement of ship-deserting sailors ====
From the 1910s, a distinct pattern of Bengali migration became evident. Bengali sailors employed in the boiler rooms of British steamships, a labor category often associated with difficult working conditions, sometimes remained in the United States after their vessels arrived at American ports. These seamen, commonly referred to as lascars (or khalasis), predominantly originated from eastern Bengal, including the regions of Sylhet, Noakhali, and Chittagong.

In 1900, the New York Post reported the presence of Indian sailors in the port areas of New York City. The report described instances of sailors remaining ashore after their vessels arrived, a practice referred to at the time as “ship jumping.” Similar patterns of maritime desertion were recorded in other major port cities, including New York, Boston, and San Francisco, where affected individuals relied on informal social networks while living outside formal immigration channels.

During the 1920s and 1930s, patterns of settlement associated with these former sailors expanded beyond coastal port cities. Over time, some individuals relocated to the United States' inland industrial regions. Documented settlements emerged in states such as New Jersey and Pennsylvania, while others obtained employment as manual laborers in Detroit's automobile manufacturing sector. This occupational shift from maritime service to industrial labor helped shape an early Bengali working-class presence in the United States.

==== Bengali Harlem ====
Racially discriminatory legislation in the early twentieth century, including the Immigration Act of 1917 and the Immigration Act of 1924, imposed significant legal restrictions on immigration and naturalization for Asian populations in the United States. Within this legal context, Bengali immigrants were frequently excluded from white residential areas and consequently resided in neighborhoods with other marginalized communities. Historical accounts document Bengali settlement in predominantly African American and Puerto Rican areas, reflecting broader patterns of residential segregation during this period.

In neighborhoods such as Harlem and the Lower East Side, historical studies document instances in which Bengali men formed family ties through marriage to African American and Latina women. Historian Vivek Bald has used the term Bengali Harlem to describe the social milieu that developed from these interethnic households. Scholarly accounts note that these families often encompassed multiple religious and cultural traditions, reflecting the diverse backgrounds of their members.

By the 1940s, Bengali residents were present in neighborhoods such as Harlem. Contemporary accounts refer to individuals, including Habib Ullah, an immigrant from eastern Bengal who is reported to have arrived in the United States via Boston in the 1920s and later settled in New York City. During the 1940s, he operated a restaurant called Bengal Garden in Manhattan's Theater District. Historical sources note that the establishment functioned as a meeting place for members of the Bengali community during this period.

The documentary film In Search of Bengali Harlem (2022) examines the history of Bengali Harlem. The film runs 84 minutes and incorporates both color and black-and-white footage. It was directed by Vivek Bald and Alaudin Ullah, and produced by Susannah Ludwig, Bald, and Ullah.

External videos
- In Search of Bengali Harlem (2022) Documentary film by Vivek Bald and Alaudin Ullah

=== Second phase (1948–1970) ===
The Partition of British India altered the political boundaries of Bengal and influenced subsequent patterns of migration. In the United States, the Luce–Celler Act of 1946 authorized a limited annual quota of 100 immigrants from India. Although numerically small, this legislation represented a partial modification of earlier restrictions on Asian immigration.

The period between 1948 and 1960 is commonly characterized in historical accounts as a transitional phase in Bengali migration to the United States. During these years, migration increasingly included individuals with advanced educational backgrounds, particularly students who entered the country on government-sponsored scholarships, including programs administered by the Pakistani state. Some of these students remained in the United States after completing their studies, contributing to longer-term settlement patterns.

A significant shift in immigration patterns followed the passage of the Immigration and Nationality Act of 1965, commonly known as the Hart–Celler Act. This legislation ended the national-origins quota system and introduced immigration criteria that emphasized occupational skills, educational qualifications, and family reunification. In the years that followed, immigrants from Bengal, then divided between East Pakistan and West Bengal, were increasingly represented among professional and academic entrants to the United States, including individuals in fields such as medicine, engineering, and higher education.

Historical scholarship has described this phase as one characterized by the migration of individuals with advanced education and professional training. During this period, Bengali immigrants were admitted to the United States primarily through educational qualifications and occupational criteria, contributing to the growing presence of professionally trained individuals of Bengali origin in the country.

=== Third phase: Bangladesh’s independence (1971–1990) ===
The Liberation War of Bangladesh influenced subsequent patterns of Bengali migration to the United States. In the period following the conflict, conditions associated with displacement, political uncertainty, and economic disruption contributed to the migration of Bangladeshi refugees and professionals to the United States.

During the 1970s, approximately 4,000 Bangladeshi nationals were officially recorded as immigrants in the United States. Immigration levels increased further in the early 1980s, and by the beginning of that decade, the Bangladeshi population in New York City was estimated at 15,000. Migration during this period included not only individuals admitted through professional and employment-based channels but also families entering under family reunification provisions, contributing to changes in the social composition of the Bangladeshi immigrant population.

During this period, some Bangladeshi immigrants relocated from New York City to cities such as Detroit and Atlantic City, where employment was available in sectors including automobile manufacturing, gaming, and hospitality. At the same time, Bangladeshi settlement expanded in Los Angeles. This presence acquired an organizational dimension with the establishment of the Bangladesh Association of Los Angeles in 1971, which was an early example of formal community organization among Bangladeshis on the West Coast of the United States.

Taken together, developments during this third phase were associated with changes in the scale, composition, and geographic distribution of the Bangladeshi immigrant population in the United States. Migration during this period increasingly included family-based settlement alongside earlier professional migration, contributing to a more diverse and geographically dispersed community in subsequent decades.

=== Fourth phase: DV lottery and mass migration (1990–present) ===
The passage of the Immigration Act of 1990 introduced additional immigration mechanisms that affected subsequent patterns of Bengali migration to the United States. Among these was the Diversity Visa (DV) Lottery, also known as the Green Card Lottery, which provided a pathway to permanent residence that was not tied to employment sponsorship or advanced educational qualifications. According to officially reported admissions data and scholarly estimates, approximately 42,462 Bangladeshi nationals entered the United States through the DV Lottery between 1995 and 2012. Although smaller in scale than later family-based migration, this group was characterized by a broad range of socioeconomic backgrounds and settlement locations.

After 2012, Bangladesh became ineligible for participation in the Diversity Visa (DV) Lottery because more than 50,000 of its nationals had obtained permanent resident status in the United States within the preceding five-year period, exceeding the statutory eligibility threshold for the program. By that time, family-based immigration had become an established pathway for Bangladeshi migration. Empirical research and analyses of immigration data indicate that Bangladeshi immigrants have sponsored additional relatives through family reunification provisions, with some studies estimating an average of approximately 4.44 relatives per principal immigrant.

Following the end of Bangladesh's eligibility for the Diversity Visa program, migration to the United States continued primarily through family-based immigration channels. Developments during this fourth phase were associated with further increases in the size and diversification of the Bangladeshi immigrant population, with settlement patterns increasingly shaped by family reunification rather than individual professional or refugee admissions. Contemporary characteristics of the Bangladeshi American population, including patterns of urban settlement, political participation, and community organization, are linked in part to immigration pathways established during this period.

== Demographic and geographic distribution ==
According to estimates from the 2020 US Census, Pew Research Center (2023) and other sources, more than 350,000 people of Bangladeshi origin currently reside in the United States. When Bengali-speaking populations from India (primarily West Bengal and Tripura) are included, the total number of Bengali speakers exceeds 400,000. It estimates, in 2026, the current size of the Bangladeshi diasporic community in the United States to exceed 600,000. Over the past two decades, this population has experienced a remarkably rapid growth rate. While the number stood at only around 40,000 in 2000, it increased by approximately 569 percent by 2023.

More than 10,000 Bangladeshis immigrate to the United States each year, primarily from the regions of Dhaka, Chittagong, Sylhet, and Noakhali. New York—particularly its five boroughs—hosts over 250,000 Bangladeshi-born immigrants and has been a major hub for Bangladeshi settlement since the 1970s.

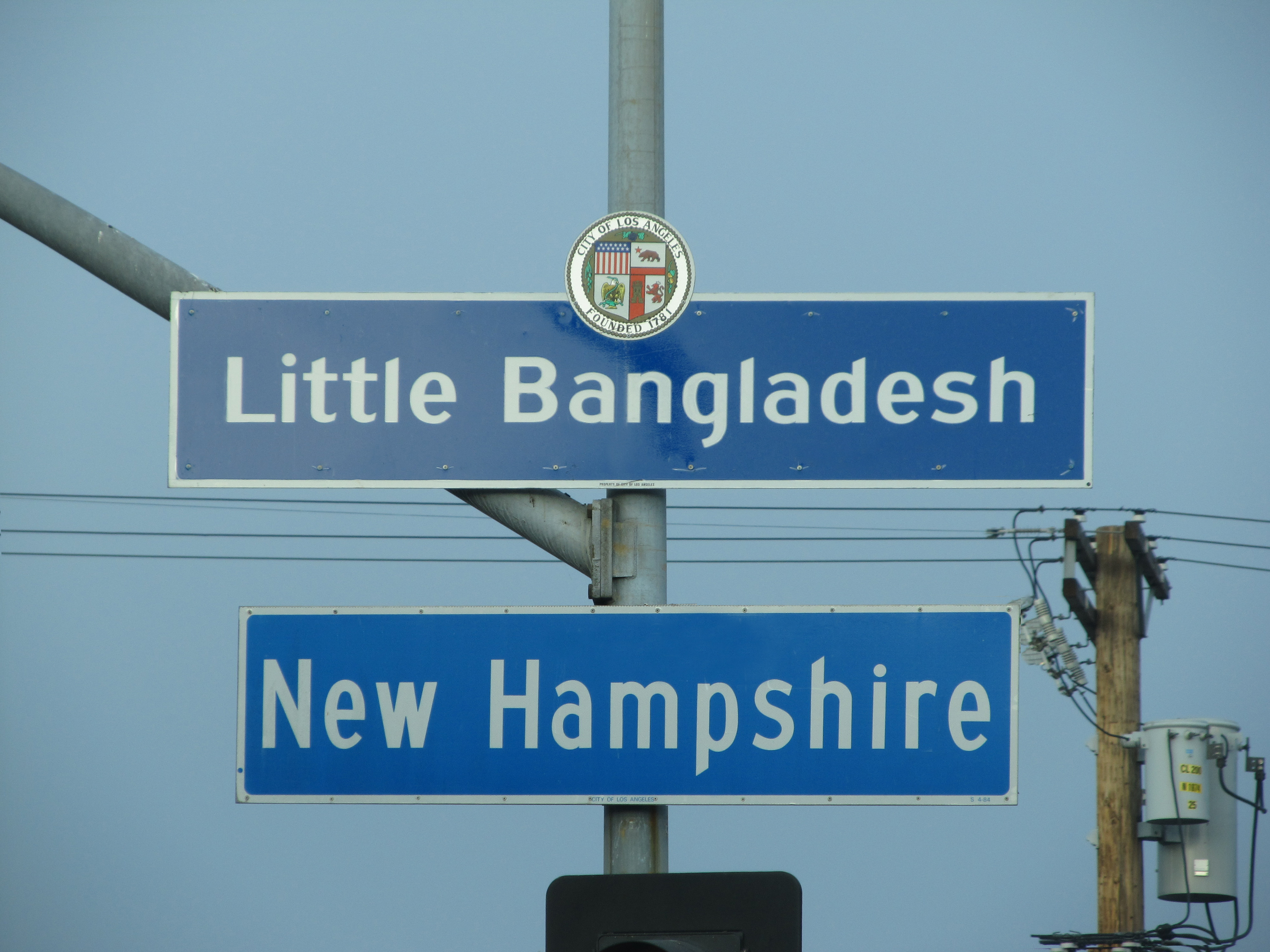
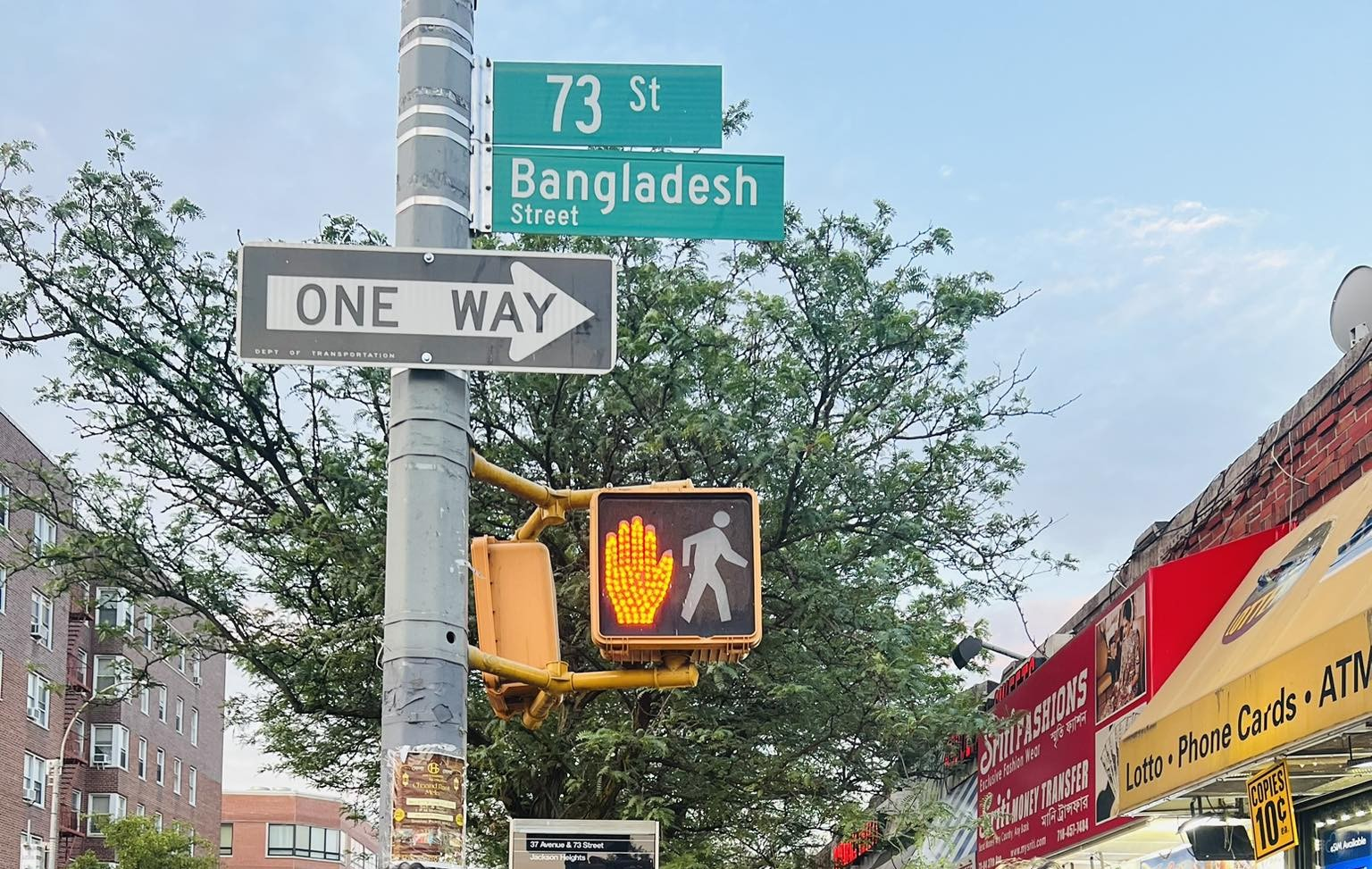
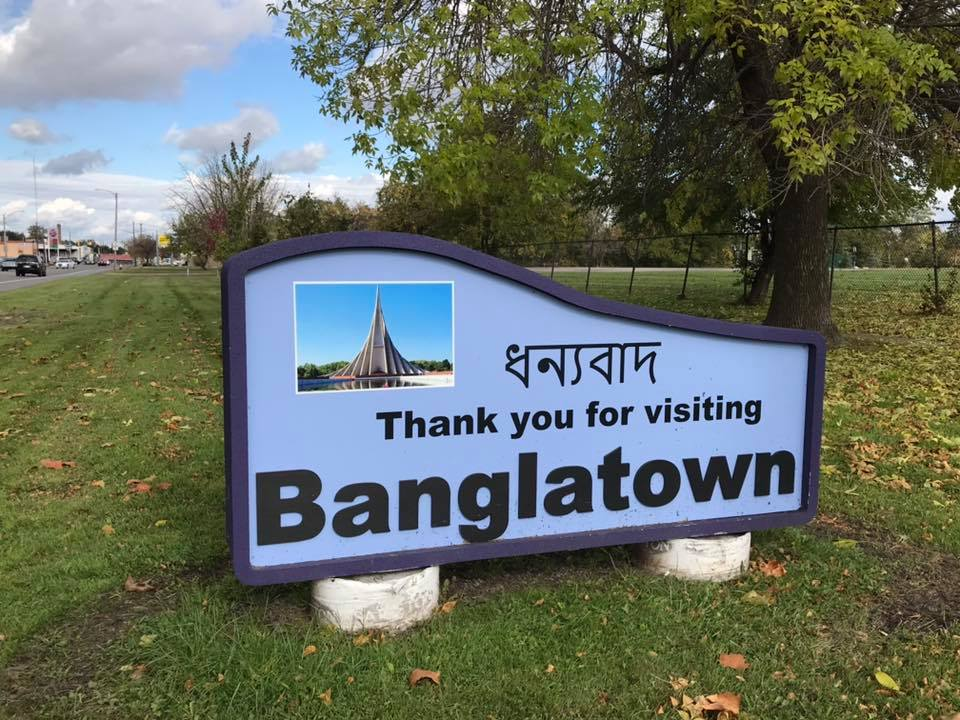
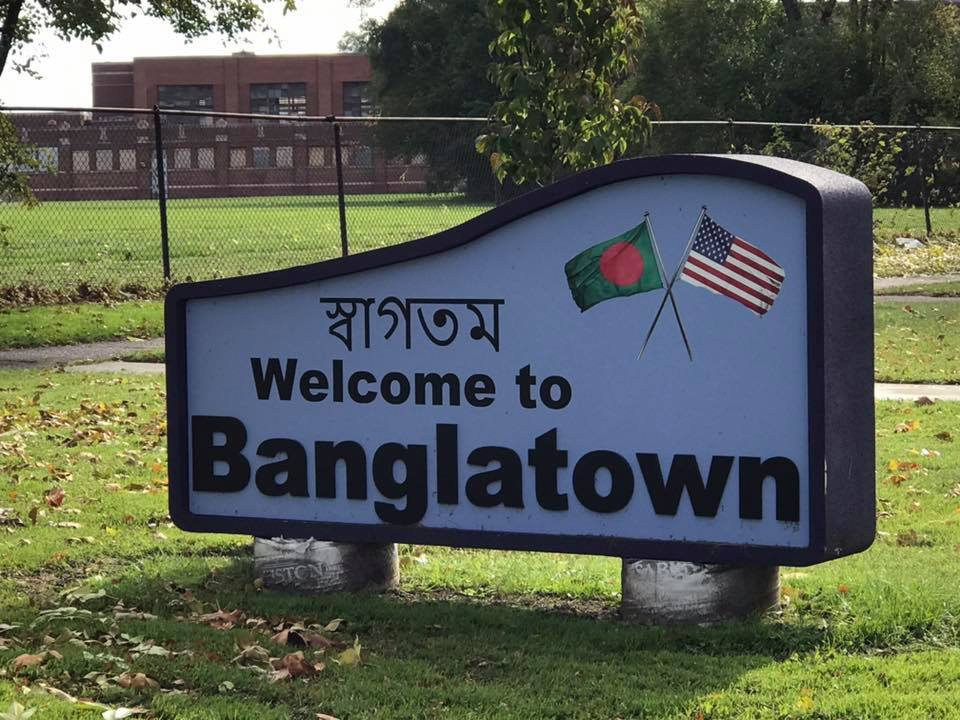
Areas with a significant Bengali population

Bengali Americans tend to concentrate primarily in major metropolitan areas across the Northeast, Mid-Atlantic, and Great Lakes regions. New York City can be regarded as the capital of Bengali Americans, as nearly 40 percent of the total Bengali population in the United States resides there. Within the city, the highest concentration is found in the borough of Queens, which is home to approximately 60 percent of New York's Bengali population. In particular, Jackson Heights and Jamaica are widely recognized as the principal commercial and cultural hubs of the Bengali community.

The city of Hamtramck in the state of Michigan represents a unique case, where approximately 25 percent (according to 2019 data) of the total population is Bengali. The city is also notable for being the first in the United States to form a Muslim-majority city council, in which Bengalis played a central role.

Significant Bengali communities are also present in Paterson and Atlantic City in New Jersey. In addition, Los Angeles, California, is home to a formally recognized neighborhood known as Little Bangladesh. Growing concentrations of upper-middle-class and middle-class Bengali families can also be observed in Dallas and Houston, Texas, as well as in various suburban areas of Virginia and Maryland.

State	Estimated population (2020 US Census & estimates)	Major Cities	Notable Areas
New York	Around 300,000 (2025 estimates)	New York City, Buffalo	Jackson Heights, Jamaica
California	Around 40,000	Los Angeles, San Francisco	Little Bangladesh
Michigan	Around 35,000	Hamtramck, Detroit, Warren	Hamtramck (approximately 25% Bengali)
Texas	Around 35,000	Dallas, Houston, Irving	Irving
New Jersey	Around 30,000	Paterson, Jersey City	Paterson 2nd Ward (More than 15,000 Bengali residents)
Virginia	Around 17,000		
Pennsylvania	Around 16,000		
Florida	Around 15,000		
Georgia (U.S. state)	Around 15,000		
Maryland	Around 15,000		
Illinois	Around 10,000		
Connecticut	Around 10,000		
Massachusetts	Around 10,000		
North Carolina	Around 7,000		
Washington	Around 6,000		
Ohio	Around 7,000		
Tennessee	Around 5,000		
Oregon	Around 3500		
Minnesota	Around 3200		
Indiana	Around 3,000		
Delaware	Around 3000		
Arizona	Around 2500		
Kansas	Around 2500		
Oklahoma	Around 2500		
Colorado	Around 2000		
Nevada	Around 2000		
Alabama	Around 1500		
Louisiana	Around 1500		
Missouri	Around 1500		
Iowa	Around 1200		
South Carolina	Around 1200		
Wisconsin	Around 1200		
Arkansas	Around 1000		
New Hampshire	Around 1000		

== Bengalis in New York ==
New York City contains the largest concentration of Bengali Americans in the United States. As of 2025, demographic estimates place the number of Bengali residents in the city at over 250,000. The state of New York, and New York City in particular, has been a major destination for Bangladeshi immigration since the 1970s, with more than 250,000 Bangladesh-born residents currently living in the state. A substantial proportion of the Bengali American population in the United States resides in New York City. Bengali communities are present across all five boroughs, with higher concentrations documented in Queens and Brooklyn. Census-based analyses further indicate that the Bangladeshi-origin population in the city has increased rapidly in recent decades compared with other Asian-origin groups.

New York State recognizes September 25 as Bangladeshi Immigrant Day, commemorating Sheikh Mujibur Rahman's historic first UN speech in Bengali in 1974, a day observed since 2019 to celebrate the vibrant Bangladeshi community, especially in Queens, and their cultural contributions, as highlighted by NY Senate resolutions recognizing its significance for cultural diversity.

In District 3 of Jackson Heights, Bengali currently ranks as the third most commonly spoken household language, following Spanish and Chinese, with approximately 5,358 households primarily using Bangla at home. Similarly, in District 12 of Jamaica, there are around 19,967 Bangla-speaking households, underscoring the deep-rooted presence of the language and community in the area. Approximately 74 percent of the Bengali population is foreign-born, primarily originating from Bangladesh or West Bengal, and about 20 percent arrived in the United States after 2010. As a result of this rapid wave of immigration, language barriers remain a significant challenge, particularly among older members of the community.

New York City contains the largest concentration of Bangladeshi Americans in the United States, with a notable presence in the Jackson Heights area of Queens. Bangladeshi settlement has expanded over several decades, with established communities in neighborhoods such as Jackson Heights, Elmhurst, and Woodside.

Cultural and community organizations have played a role in sustaining collective activities among Bangladeshi residents. One such organization is Muktadhara, a New York-based cultural group that has organized public events related to Bengali literature and culture for more than two decades, including the International Mother Language Day and Bengali Book Fairs. Bangladeshi-owned businesses, including grocery stores, clothing shops, and restaurants, are present in several neighborhoods. Bangladeshi communities are distributed across all five boroughs of New York City.

=== Notable areas ===
==== Jackson Heights ====
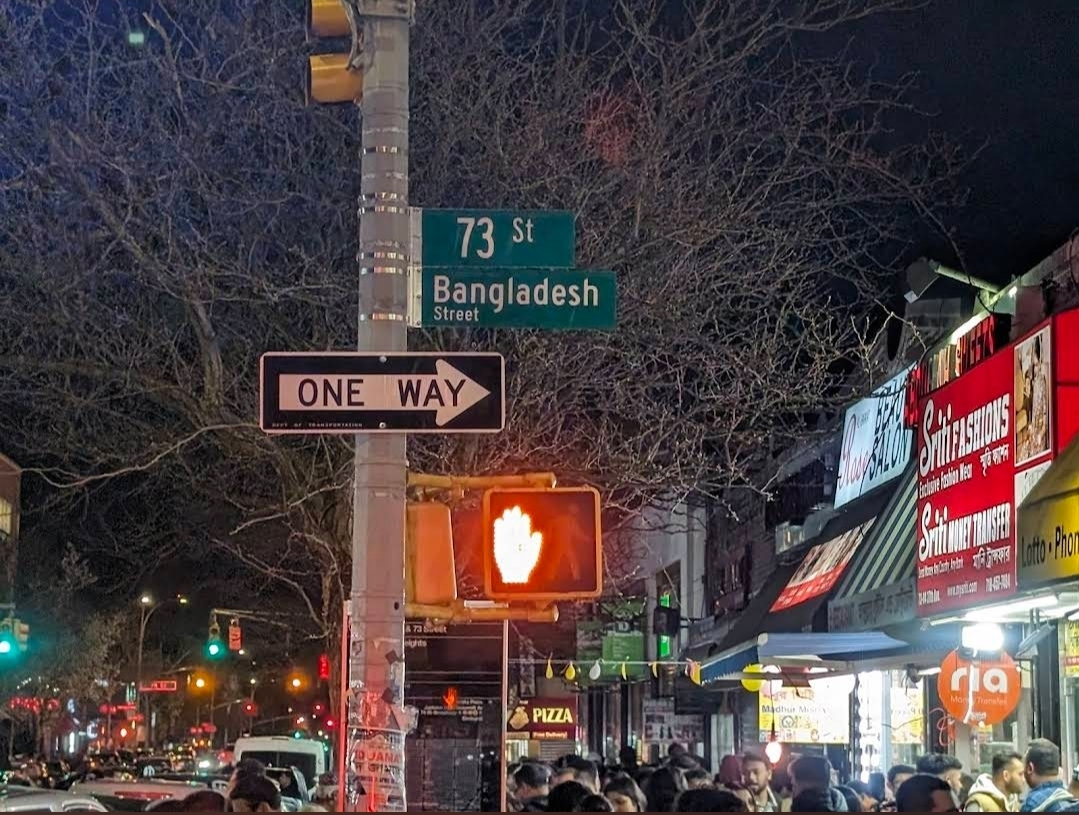
Bangladesh Street at Jackson Heights

Jackson Heights is not merely a residential neighborhood; it is the cultural and commercial heart of Bengali Americans in the United States. Centered around 73rd Street and Roosevelt Avenue, the area often gives visitors the impression of walking through a bustling district of Dhaka. Established in 1997, the Jackson Heights Bangladeshi Business Association (JBBA) plays a leading role in the neighborhood's economic life. The association currently operates with a strong executive committee of 35 officials dedicated to safeguarding the interests of local businesses.

Jackson Heights is a center of political activity for the Bangladeshi diaspora, with Diversity Plaza serving as a frequent gathering point for demonstrations related to both local and Bangladeshi politics. The neighborhood's Bengali commercial district includes restaurants and bakeries such as Sagar Restaurant, Deshi Swad, and Kabir's Bakery, which draw customers from across the New York metropolitan area.

==== Jamaica ====
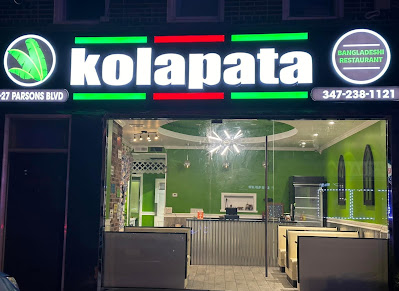
Kolapata Bengali restaurant at Jamaica, Queens

The Jamaica neighborhood of Queens—particularly around 169th Street and Hillside Avenue—has emerged as the largest Bengali settlement in New York City. The area known as Little Bangladesh is especially renowned for its diverse food culture. Each year on February 21—International Mother Language Day—the streets of Jamaica fill with Bengalis dressed in red and white, gathering in large numbers to commemorate the Language Movement and reaffirm their collective linguistic and cultural identity.

==== Parkchester ====
Located in the Bronx borough, Parkchester—once a predominantly white neighborhood—has gradually transformed into a thriving Bengali enclave popularly known as Bangla Bazar. Centered around Starling Avenue, the area has undergone a remarkable economic shift: where only a handful of shops existed some 17 years ago, there are now hundreds of Bangladeshi-owned businesses. One of the neighborhood's most recognizable landmarks is Khalil Biryani House, owned by Khalil Rahman. Although Rahman once aspired to become an aeronautical engineer, he ultimately built a successful career as a restaurateur, symbolizing the entrepreneurial trajectory of many Bengali immigrants in the area. The Parkchester Jame Masjid stands as a powerful symbol of religious cohesion in the community. Since its construction on Virginia Avenue in 1989, the mosque has played a pivotal role in accelerating Bengali settlement in Parkchester. The neighborhood has also produced prominent community leaders, including Mujibur Majumder, who made history by becoming New York City's first Bangladeshi Community Board Chair, marking a significant milestone in civic representation.

==== Kensington and Astoria ====
In Brooklyn, the neighborhood of Kensington, particularly along and around McDonald Avenue, has developed into a large and cohesive Bengali community. In October 2022, a street corner in the Kensington neighborhood of Brooklyn was officially designated as Little Bangladesh. The designation applies to the area around the intersection of Church Avenue and McDonald Avenue. The site has since functioned as a local point of reference for recently arrived Bangladeshi immigrants, where community networks and services related to housing and employment are accessible. Popular eateries such as Ghoroya enjoy a level of popularity comparable to their counterparts in Jamaica, drawing Bengali families from across the city. By contrast, Astoria, once predominantly Greek, has seen a notable growth in Bangladeshi-owned grocery stores and taxi garages in recent years, reflecting a shift in the neighborhood's demographic and economic landscape. Significant Bengali populations are also found in Ozone Park and the City Line area, where community members contribute substantially to keeping New York's economic engine running through small businesses, transportation services, and essential labor.

=== State and legal status of the Bangla Language ===
Within New York City's linguistic diversity, Bangla is no longer merely a language spoken at home; it has attained formal legal recognition as an official medium in public administration. In a city where more than 200 languages are spoken, Bangla has been made mandatory at multiple institutional levels.

==== Bangla on election ballots ====
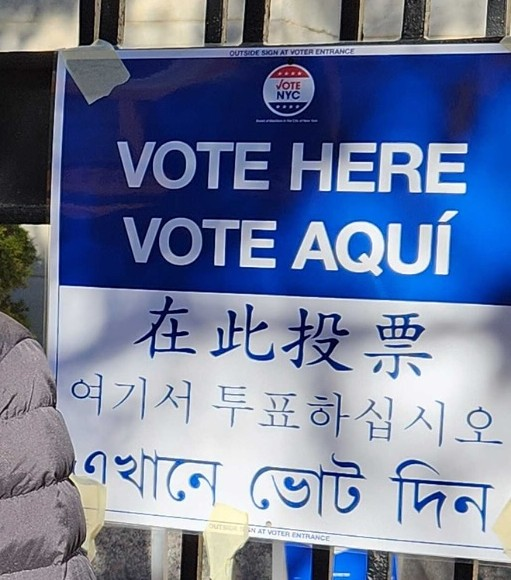

The inclusion of Bangla on New York City's ballot papers during the 2024 United States presidential election marked a historic milestone. This was not a routine administrative decision; rather, it was the result of the rigorous enforcement of the Voting Rights Act of 1965. According to Michael J. Ryan, executive director of the New York City Board of Elections, a legal settlement created an obligation to include an Asian language on ballots based on specific population density thresholds. After extensive deliberations, Bangla was selected for this recognition. This outcome was made possible by the substantial presence, sustained advocacy, and civic engagement of the Bangladeshi community in New York City, without whose demographic strength and organized efforts the inclusion of Bangla would not have been feasible.

Although the use of Bangla at select polling sites in Queens began as early as 2013, it has since gained citywide significance. Alongside English, the four languages included on New York City ballots are Spanish, Chinese, Korean, and Bangla.

==== Official information and interpretation services ====
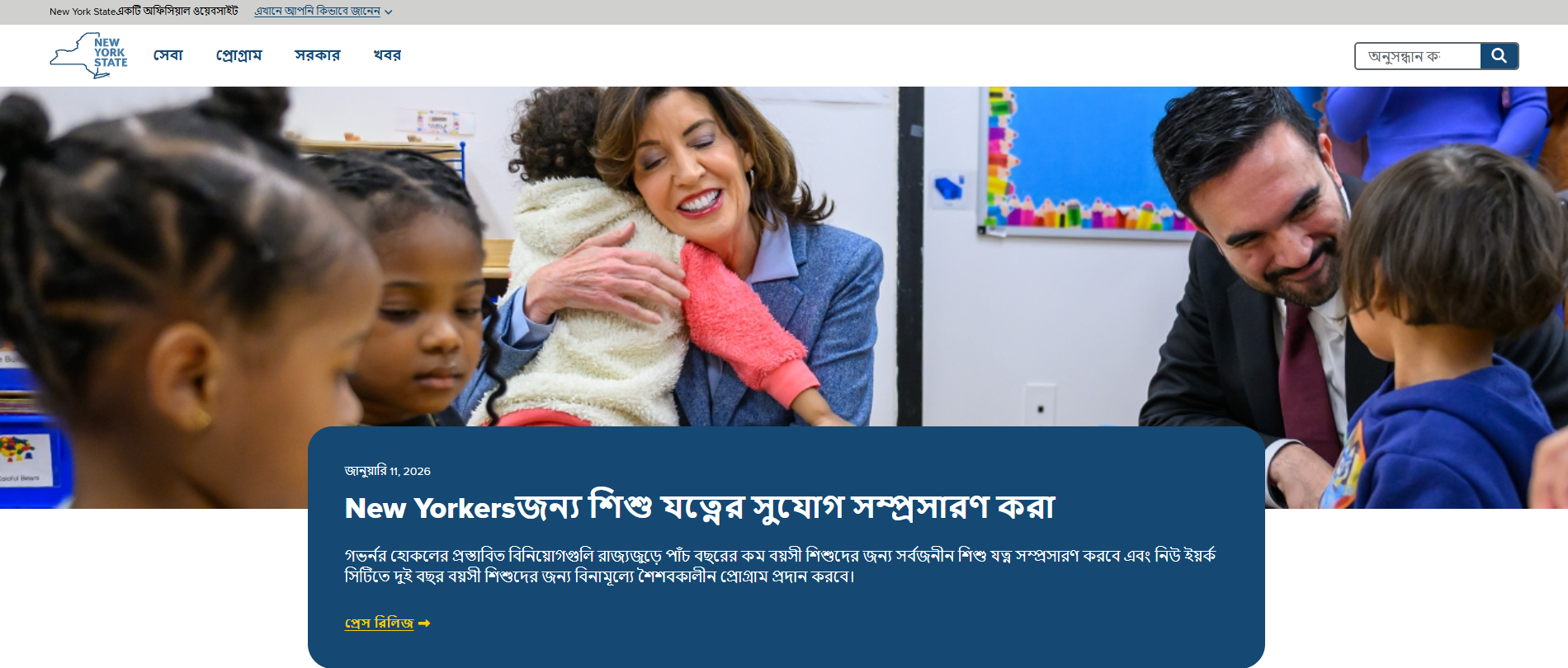
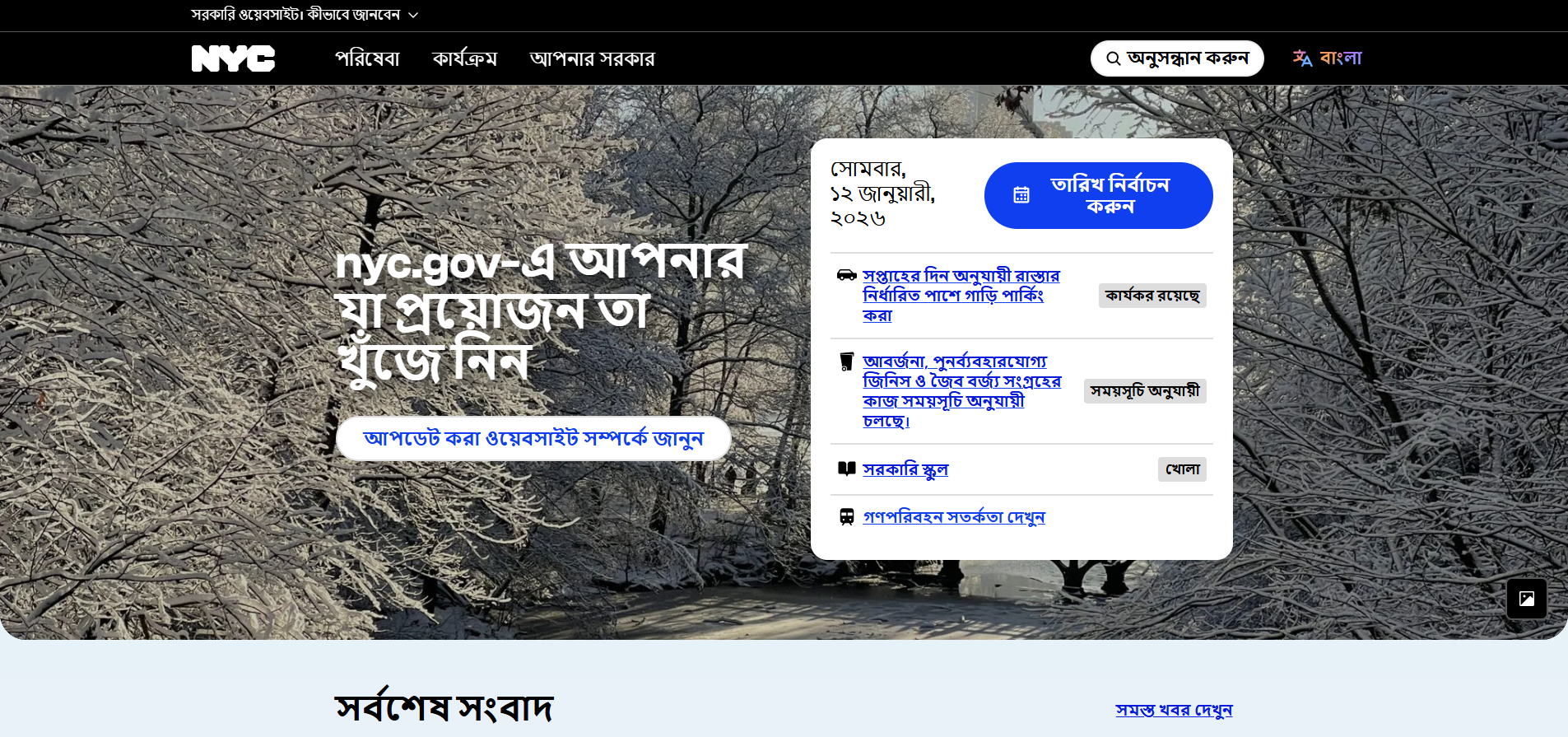
The official websites of New York state & NYC are available in Bangla.

Various New York City government agencies are now required to provide information in Bangla. The New York City Civic Engagement Commission offers interpreter services for Bangla-speaking voters during elections. Through the efforts of City Council Member Shahana Hanif and other community leaders, the availability of Bangla translations for health and education–related information has increased substantially across relevant municipal departments. The official websites of New York state & New York City are also available in Bangla. Moreover, emergency alerts issued through Notify NYC are now accessible in Bangla, ensuring broader and more inclusive public communication.

==== Public transportation and infrastructure ====
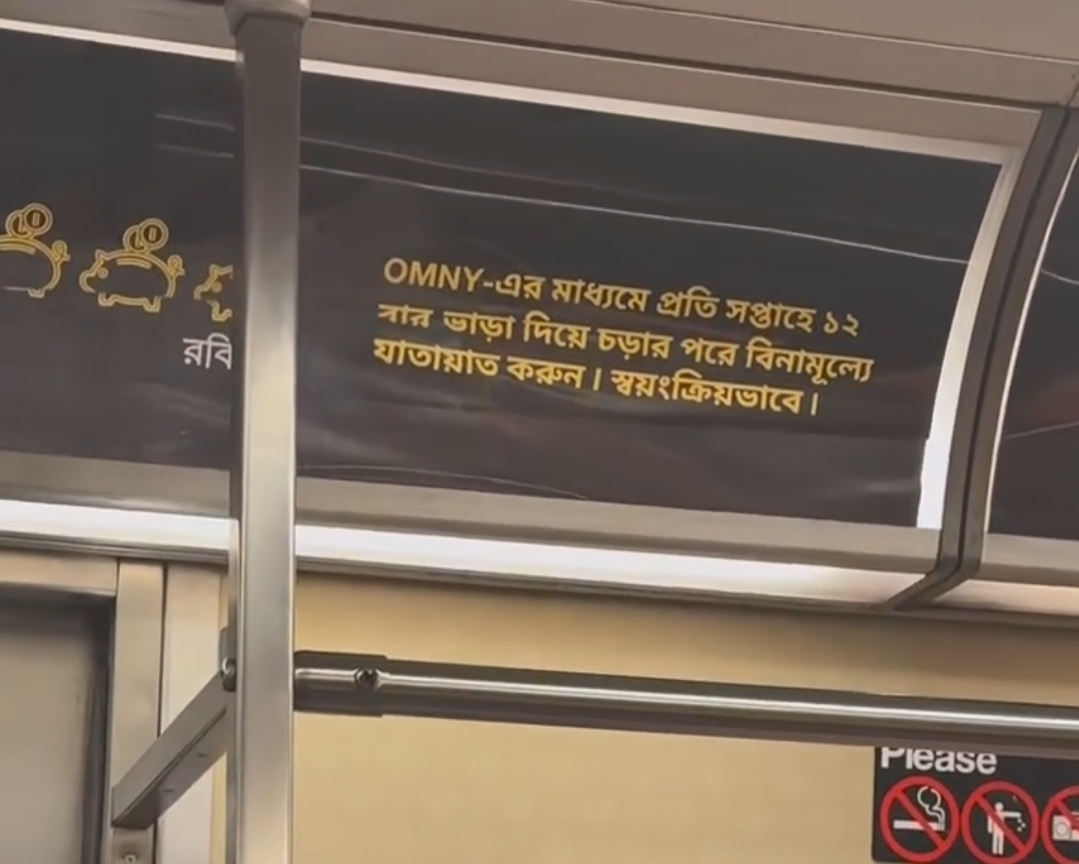
Bengali in New York City Subway

The Metropolitan Transportation Authority (MTA) of New York City has introduced extensive linguistic accommodations to facilitate mobility for the Bengali-speaking population. Bangla has now been incorporated as one of the MTA's key languages within its official language access policies. In particular, under Title VI—which mandates the elimination of language-based discrimination—important MTA guidelines and notices have been translated into Bangla.

To better serve visually impaired passengers and riders with limited English proficiency, the MTA has introduced an application called NaviLens. Using QR-style codes, the app can audibly translate station signage and train schedules into nearly 40 languages, including Bangla. In addition, executive summaries of final environmental assessments for major MTA initiatives—such as the Central Business District Tolling Program (CBDTP)—have been published in Bangla, reflecting the language's growing institutional recognition within the city's transportation infrastructure.

==== Others ====
A designated book section known as Bangla Corner was inaugurated at the Queens Public Library in New York City. The initiative was launched with a collection of 309 Bengali-language books donated by the Bangladesh Consulate General in New York.

=== Politics and civic engagement ===
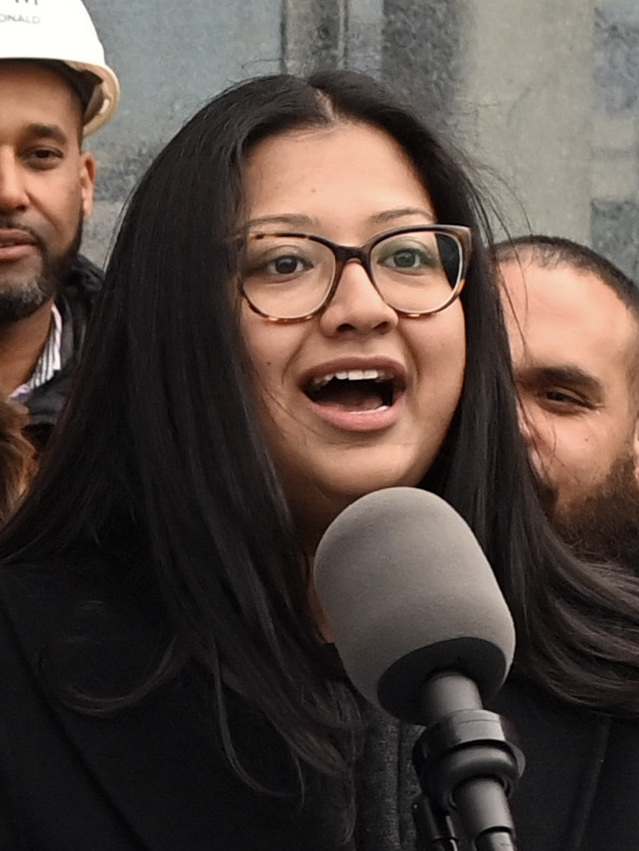
Shahana Hanif

In 2021, Shahana Hanif was elected to the New York City Council, making history as the first Muslim woman and the first person of South Asian descent to hold a seat on the council. Representing Brooklyn's 39th District, Hanif has emerged as a leading voice on immigrant rights, housing for the unhoused, and feminist advocacy. Her victory has significantly heightened political aspirations among younger generations of Bengali New Yorkers.

==== Advocacy and rights-based organizations ====
Several nonprofit organizations are actively working to strengthen the community's political influence and protect civil rights:

- Chhaya CDC: For more than two decades, this organization has focused on housing justice and economic self-sufficiency for South Asian communities. It has played a pivotal role in advancing policy reforms related to basement apartment legalization and language access.
- DRUM (Desis Rising Up and Moving): Founded in 2000, DRUM primarily advocates for the rights of low-income workers and youth. The organization is particularly active in campaigns centered on immigrant rights and police accountability.
- ASAAL (Alliance of South Asian American Labor): ASAAL serves as a political platform for South Asian workers and is known for endorsing candidates in local and national elections, thereby amplifying labor-focused political engagement within the community.

=== Education and merit-based representation ===
The practice of the Bangla language and the academic achievements of Bengali students are firmly embedded within New York's education system.

==== Higher education and research ====
The significance of Bangla is now formally recognized at several of New York's leading universities:

- City College of New York (CCNY): At CCNY, Bangla is currently the fourth most commonly spoken native language among students. In response to student demand, the college offers a one-year Bangla language program that fulfills institutional language requirements. The language is taught by Professor Abul Kalam Azad.
- Columbia University: At Columbia's School of Professional Studies, Bangla courses are offered at the introductory, intermediate, and advanced levels. Instructors such as Rajima Chowdhury and Dwijen Bhattacharya teach Bangla at the university.
- Heritage Speaker Courses: Specialized courses titled Bengali for Heritage Speakers have been designed for students who speak Bangla at home but lack formal literacy skills in reading and writing the language.

==== Public education and language support ====
Within New York City's public school system, a wide range of language support services is provided for Bangla-speaking students. This support extends even to the translation of Special Education–related documents into Bangla. In addition, numerous community-based weekend schools operate across the city, where children are taught the Bangla language alongside Bengali history and culture, reinforcing linguistic continuity across generations.

=== Religious and cultural institutionalization ===
Religious institutions and cultural celebrations form a central pillar of Bengali social life in New York. In every neighborhood with a significant Bengali population, the presence of mosques, temples, and churches is clearly visible.

==== Mosques and Islamic centers ====
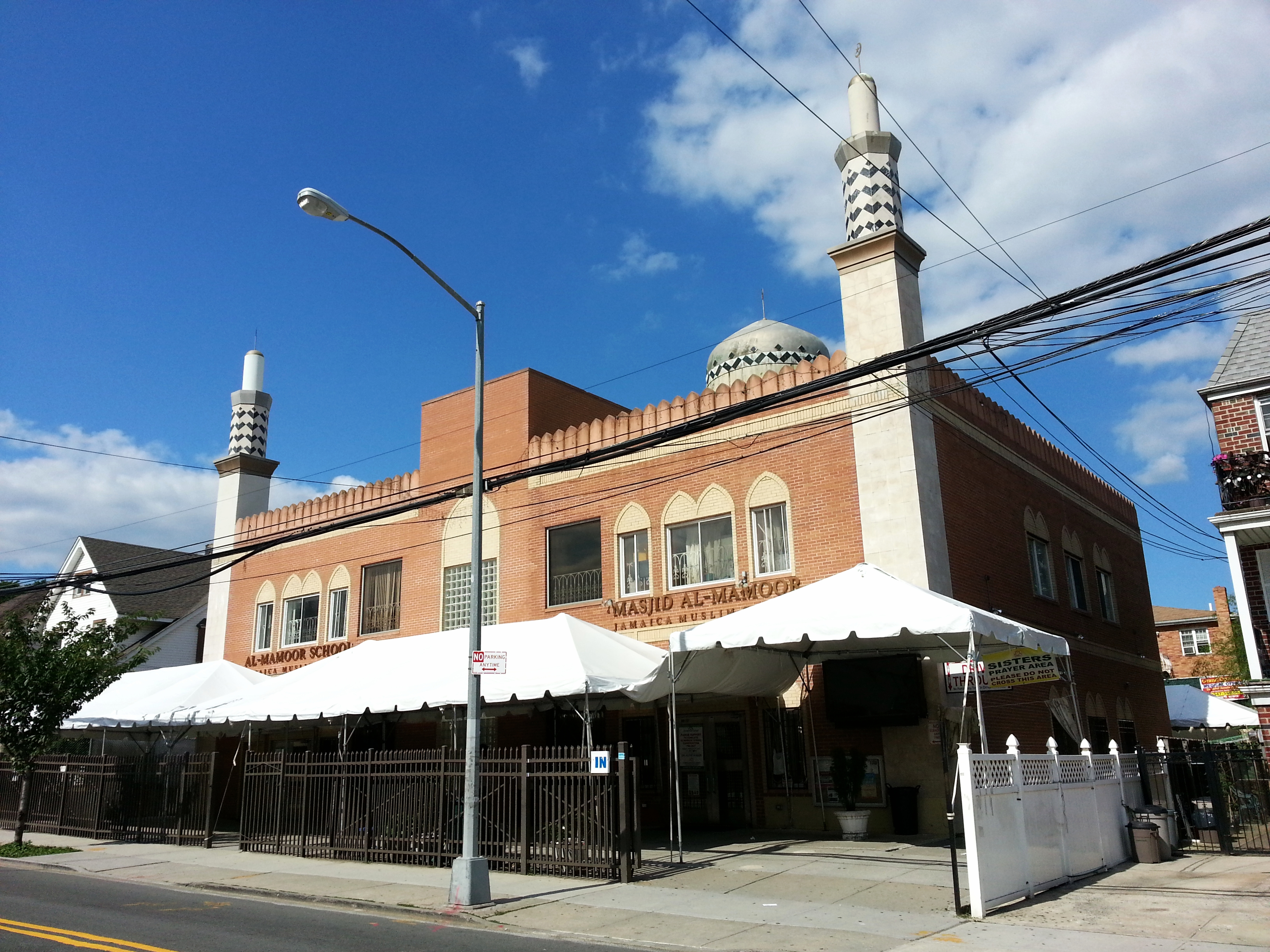
Masjid Al Mamoor

The majority of Bengalis in New York are Muslim, and numerous Bengali-founded mosques are located in areas such as Jamaica in Queens and Kensington in Brooklyn.

- Masjid Al-Aman: Located in Brooklyn, this mosque is regarded as one of the largest Bengali-built mosques in New York. According to publicly reported figures, more than 2,000 worshippers attend the Friday congregational prayers.
- Jamaica Muslim Center (Masjid Al-Mamoor): This central institution for the community plays a leading role not only in religious life but also in social and community-oriented activities.
- Islamic Cultural Center of New York: This historic mosque in Manhattan also has a strong and active presence of Bangla-speaking congregants.

==== Hindu temples and Christian churches ====
New York also serves as an important hub for Bengali Hindus and Christians:

- Bangladesh Hindu Mandir: This nonprofit religious organization serves the spiritual and cultural needs of Hindus across New York, New Jersey, and Connecticut. Regular religious rituals and community events are held at the temple.
- Christian Churches: In Woodhaven, the First Bengali Baptist Church and the All Nations Baptist Church conduct worship services in Bangla and operate Sunday schools for children under the leadership of Pastor Aldrin P. Baidya. In Brooklyn, the Brooklyn Evangelical Bengali Church serves as a major place of worship for Bengali Christians.

==== Cultural festivals and community fairs ====
Bengali cultural life in New York includes:

- Pohela Boishakh: To celebrate the Bengali New Year, large-scale fairs and colorful street processions are organized annually in Jamaica, Jackson Heights, and Brooklyn, drawing thousands of participants.
- Book Fairs: A Bangladeshi book fair is held every year along Hillside Avenue in Jamaica, providing an important platform for expatriate writers and publishers to showcase their work and engage with the community.
- North American Bengali Conference: First launched in New York in 1981, this conference has grown into the largest gathering of Indian Bengalis (mainly Hindus) in North America. It functions as a major platform for music, dance, literary discussions, and business networking.

=== Economic vibrancy ===
Bengali contributions to New York's local economy are most visibly expressed through small businesses. The commercial corridors of Jackson Heights and Jamaica stand as living testaments to the community's entrepreneurial success and economic resilience.

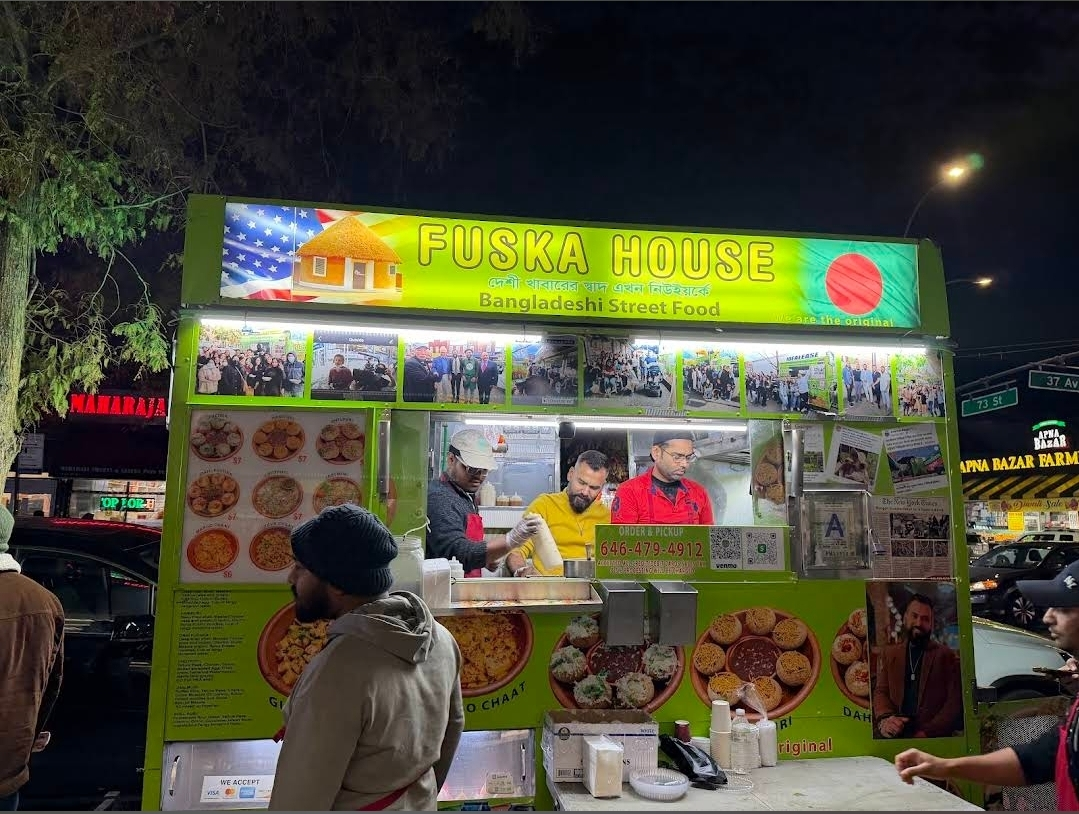
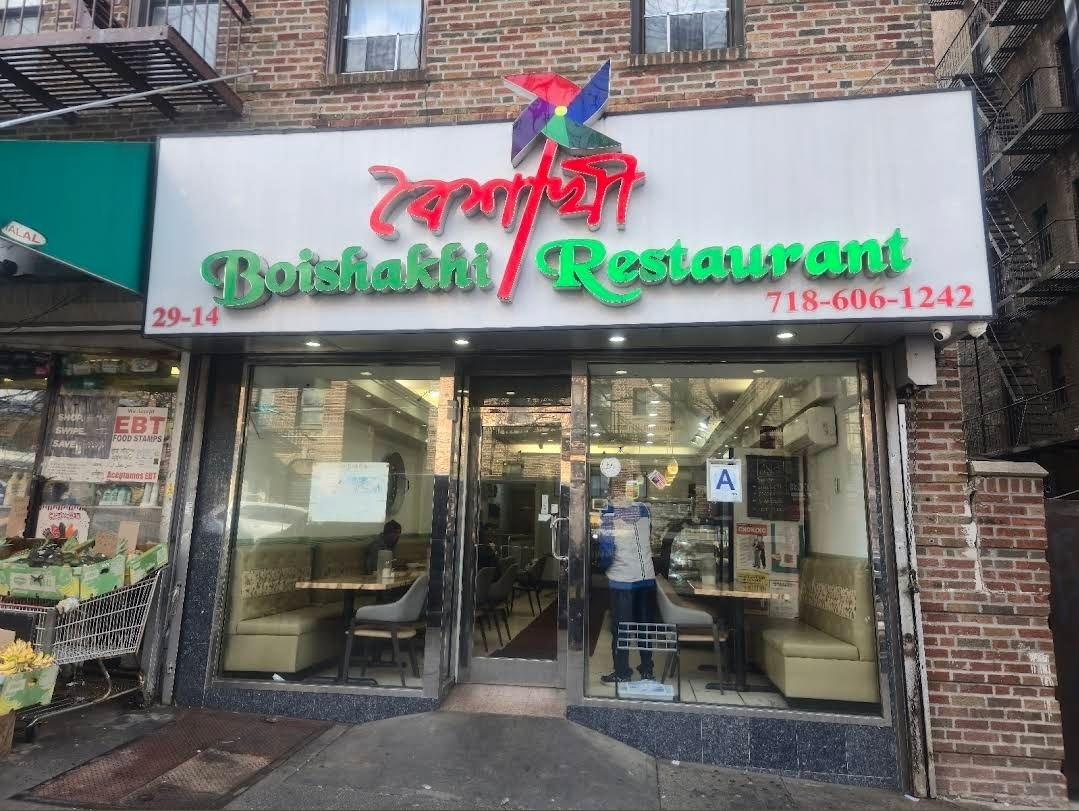
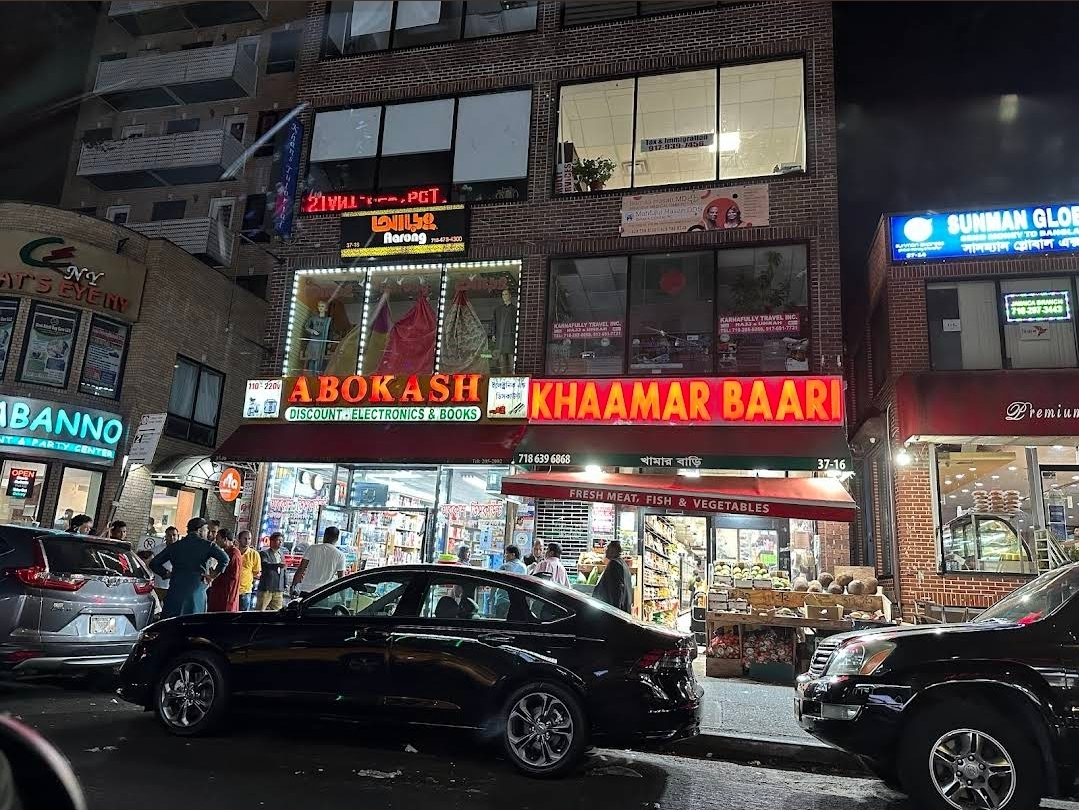
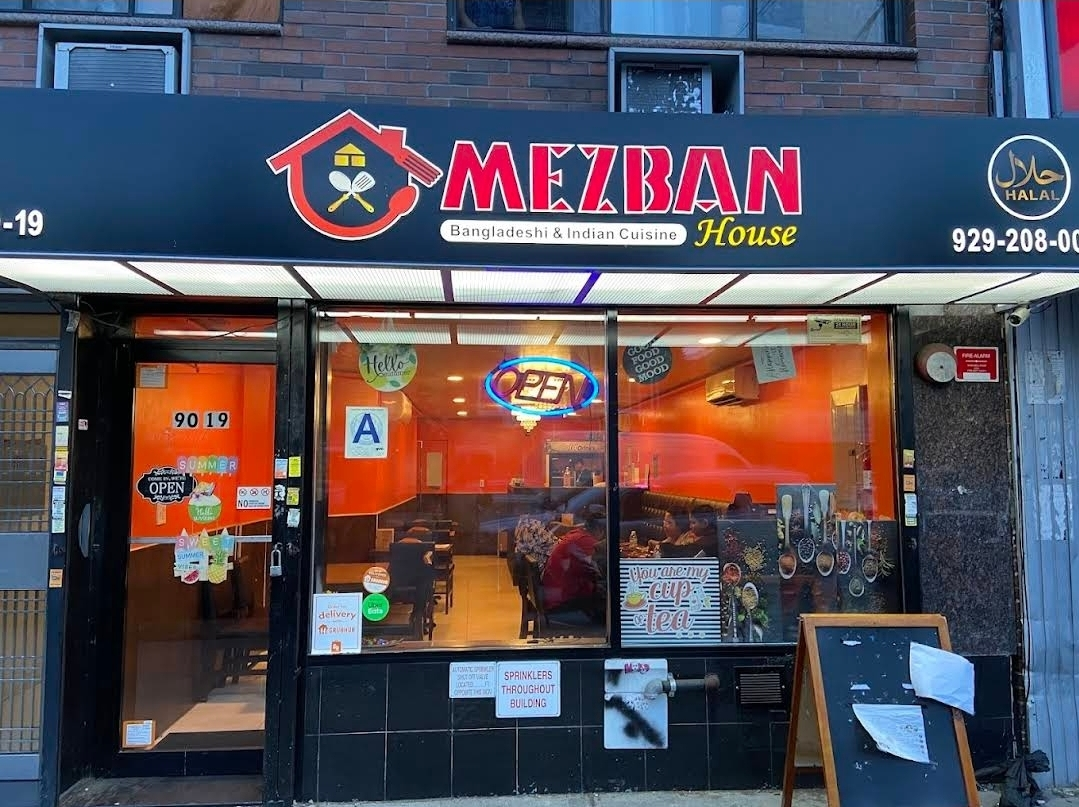
Bengali food stalls, restaurants & shops at Jackson Heights

==== Fuchka trucks and street food culture ====
In the streets of Jackson Heights, fuchka trucks have evolved into a cultural emblem. These mobile food businesses do more than sell street snacks; they serve as accessible sources of employment for newly arrived immigrants. By recreating the familiar atmosphere of Old Dhaka or Kolkata's street life, these ventures bring a sense of cultural continuity to New York. Sociologists note that such cultural familiarity can have a positive effect on immigrants’ mental well-being, easing the stresses of displacement and adaptation.

==== Social capital and peer lending circles (tapot) ====
A significant number of Bengali entrepreneurs rely on community-based financing rather than conventional bank loans. By leveraging social capital, they form informal peer lending circles—locally known as tapot. In these arrangements, trusted members contribute a fixed sum each month, and through a lottery system, one member receives a lump-sum loan. Personal trust and social reputation often carry greater weight than formal credit scores in this system. Organizations such as Chhaya CDC have supported and facilitated these lending circles, enabling many Bengali families to transition from renting to homeownership and strengthening long-term economic stability within the community.

=== Media and news ecosystem ===
The New York's Bengali community has access to a significant number of Bangla-language media outlets.

==== Newspapers ====
Published since 1991, Weekly Bangali is widely regarded as the most popular Bangla newspaper in New York. In addition to its print edition, it has successfully expanded into digital publishing through an e-paper format. Other long-running newspapers, such as Weekly Thikana and Weekly Ajker Probash, have also served the community for decades.

==== Television ====
Bangla television channels broadcasting from New York play a significant role in highlighting the experiences and concerns of the diaspora. Notable among them are ATN Bangla USA, ABTV, TBN24 and Time Television, both of which focus extensively on issues affecting expatriate Bengalis.

==== Radio ====
Radio Treetal Bangla and Radio Ruposhi Bangla operates from Brooklyn & Jamaica, Queens, and is recognized as the first 24/7 live Bangla radio station in the United States, providing continuous news, cultural programming, and community-focused content for Bengali listeners nationwide.

== In other notable areas ==
=== Michigan ===
The city of Hamtramck, in the state of Michigan, has drawn nationwide attention in the United States. It is widely recognized as the first—and so far the only—American city where the mayor and all members of the city council are Muslim, with a substantial portion of them being of Bangladeshi origin.

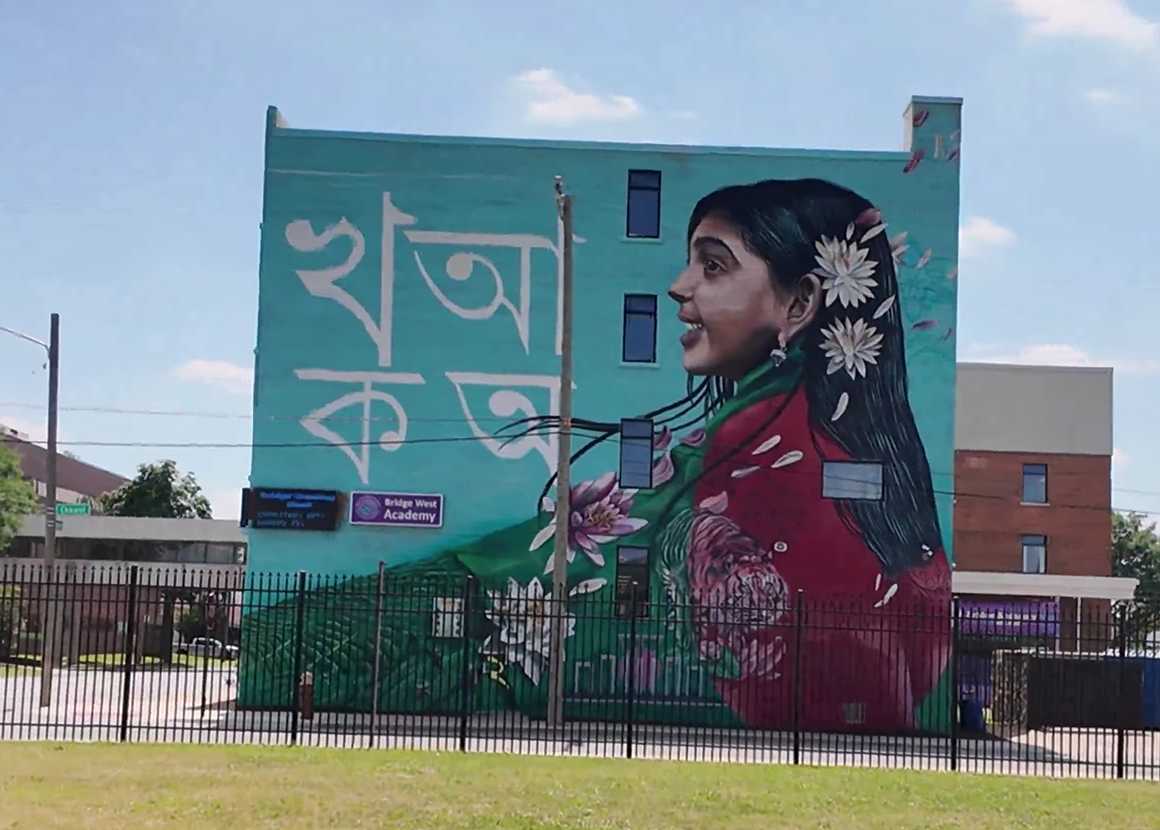
Bengali language mural at Hamtramck, Michigan

==== Hamtramck ====
Today, Bengalis constitute a significant share of Hamtramck's population; estimates commonly place this proportion anywhere between roughly one-quarter and over half of the city's residents. Historically a Polish-American city, Hamtramck began to undergo a profound demographic transformation from the 1990s onward with the steady arrival of Bangladeshi immigrants. In 2022, Amer Ghalib was elected as the city's first Muslim mayor. Although of Yemeni descent, he has worked alongside Bangladeshi city council members to usher in a new chapter in Hamtramck's municipal governance. Institutions such as the Al-Islah Islamic Center and popular establishments like Bengali Sylhet Cafe reflect the city's evolving cultural identity. Hamtramck also hosts events such as Deshi Festive Nights, community fairs where Bangladeshi music—including metal bands—finds an enthusiastic audience, highlighting the diversity of cultural expression within the diaspora.

Beyond Hamtramck, notable Bengali populations are also found in Warren and Detroit, where many Bengalis are employed in the automotive and healthcare sectors, contributing significantly to Michigan's industrial and service-based economy.

=== California ===
In California, Bengali settlement is broadly divided into two distinct spheres: a cultural enclave in Los Angeles and a highly skilled professional community in Silicon Valley.

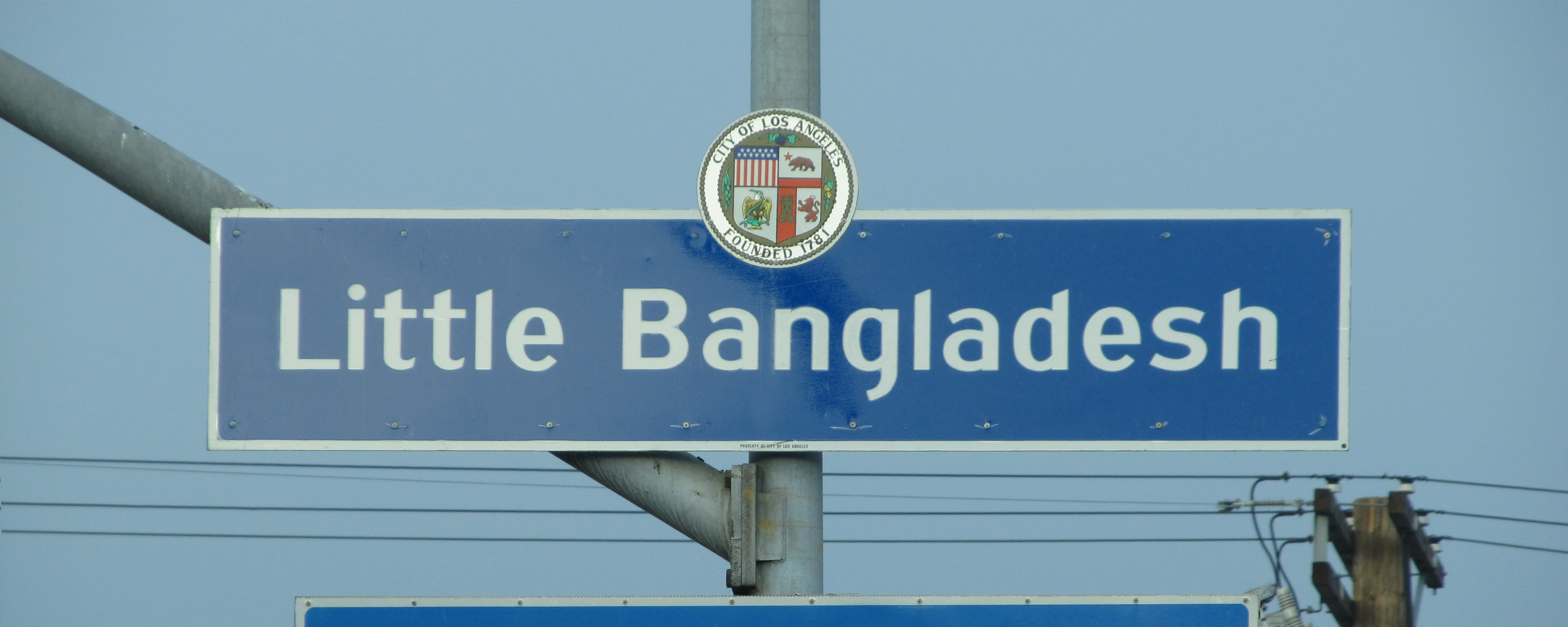
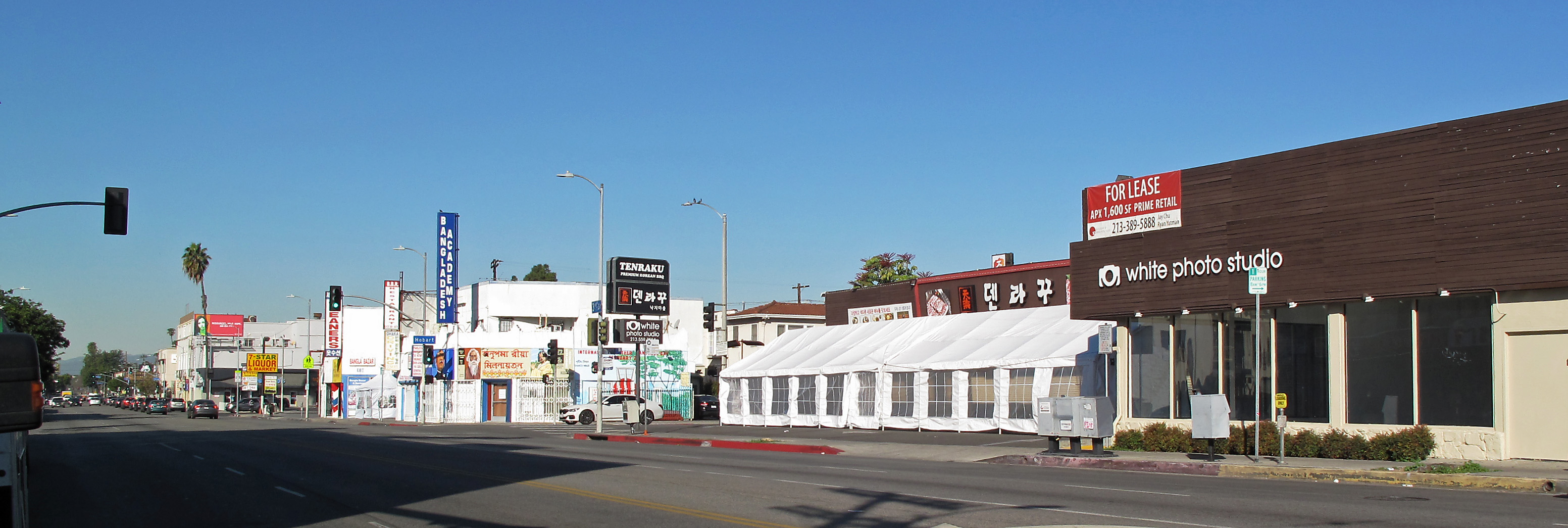
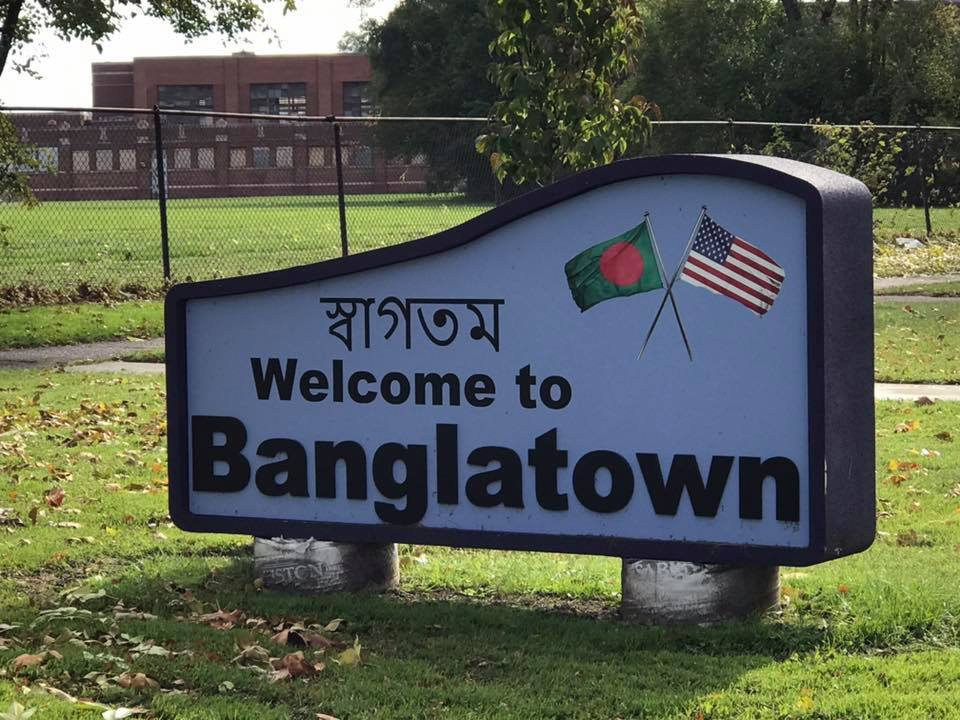
North side of 3rd St., in Little Bangladesh

==== Little Bangladesh, Los Angeles ====
The area around Third Street and Alexandria Avenue in Los Angeles was officially designated as Little Bangladesh (Los Angeles) in 2010. Located adjacent to Koreatown, this recognition was the culmination of a long struggle for visibility and cultural affirmation. One of the earliest pioneers of the neighborhood was Aladin Sweets, established in the early 1990s at a time when virtually no Bengali-owned businesses existed in the area. Today, restaurants such as Biryani Kabab House and Kasturi Restaurant serve as major culinary hubs for the community. The Bengali population in this part of Los Angeles is notably influenced by migrants from the Chattogram region of Bangladesh, shaping the area's social and cultural character.

==== Silicon Valley and San Jose ====
In Northern California's Silicon Valley, the Bengali community is predominantly composed of engineers and technology professionals. The headquarters of the American Association of Bangladeshi Engineers and Architects (AABEA) is currently based in this region, reflecting the strong professional footprint of Bengalis in the technology sector. Although Bengalis in Silicon Valley are geographically dispersed across residential neighborhoods, they remain closely connected through religious institutions and cultural associations.

=== New Jersey and Texas ===
New Jersey and Texas are increasingly being recognized as new hubs for Bengali settlement in the United States. Rising living costs and limited housing availability in New York have encouraged many Bengali families to relocate to these states in search of affordability and space.

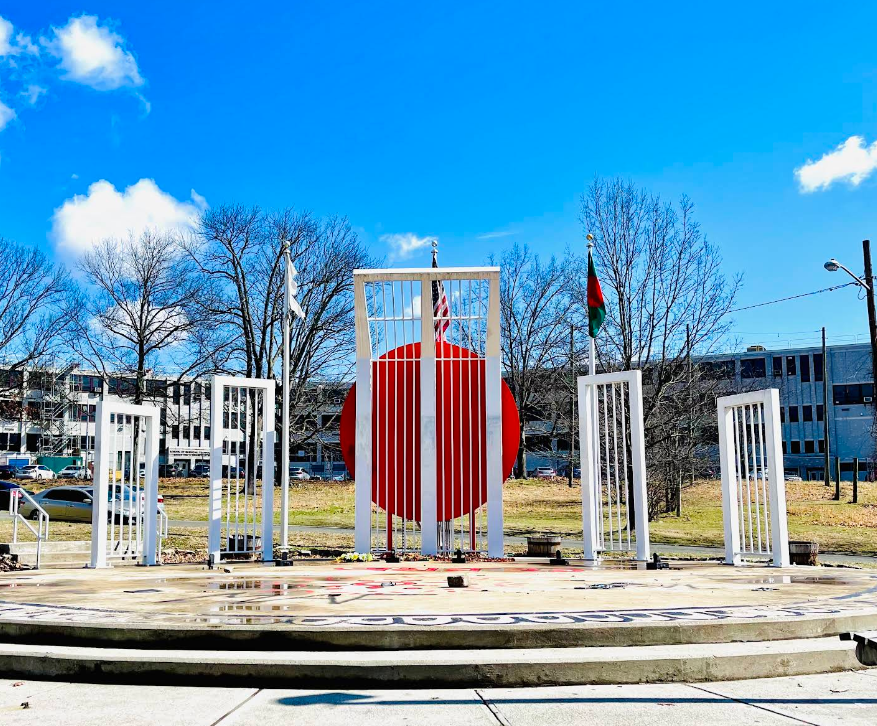
Shaheed Minar in Paterson, New Jersey

==== Bengali communities in New Jersey ====
The city of Paterson has emerged as one of the most prominent Bengali centers outside New York. Notably, Paterson is home to a permanent Shaheed Minar, symbolizing the preservation of Bengali linguistic and cultural heritage in the diaspora. In Atlantic City, an estimated 10 percent of the population is of Bangladeshi origin, with many residents employed in the casino and tourism industries. In addition, affluent and professionally successful Bengali families are concentrated in areas such as Monroe Township and Princeton. The Ananda Mandir in Somerset—established in 1995—is regarded as one of the most historic Bengali Hindu temples in North America, serving as both a religious and cultural center for the community.

==== Irving and Houston, Texas ====
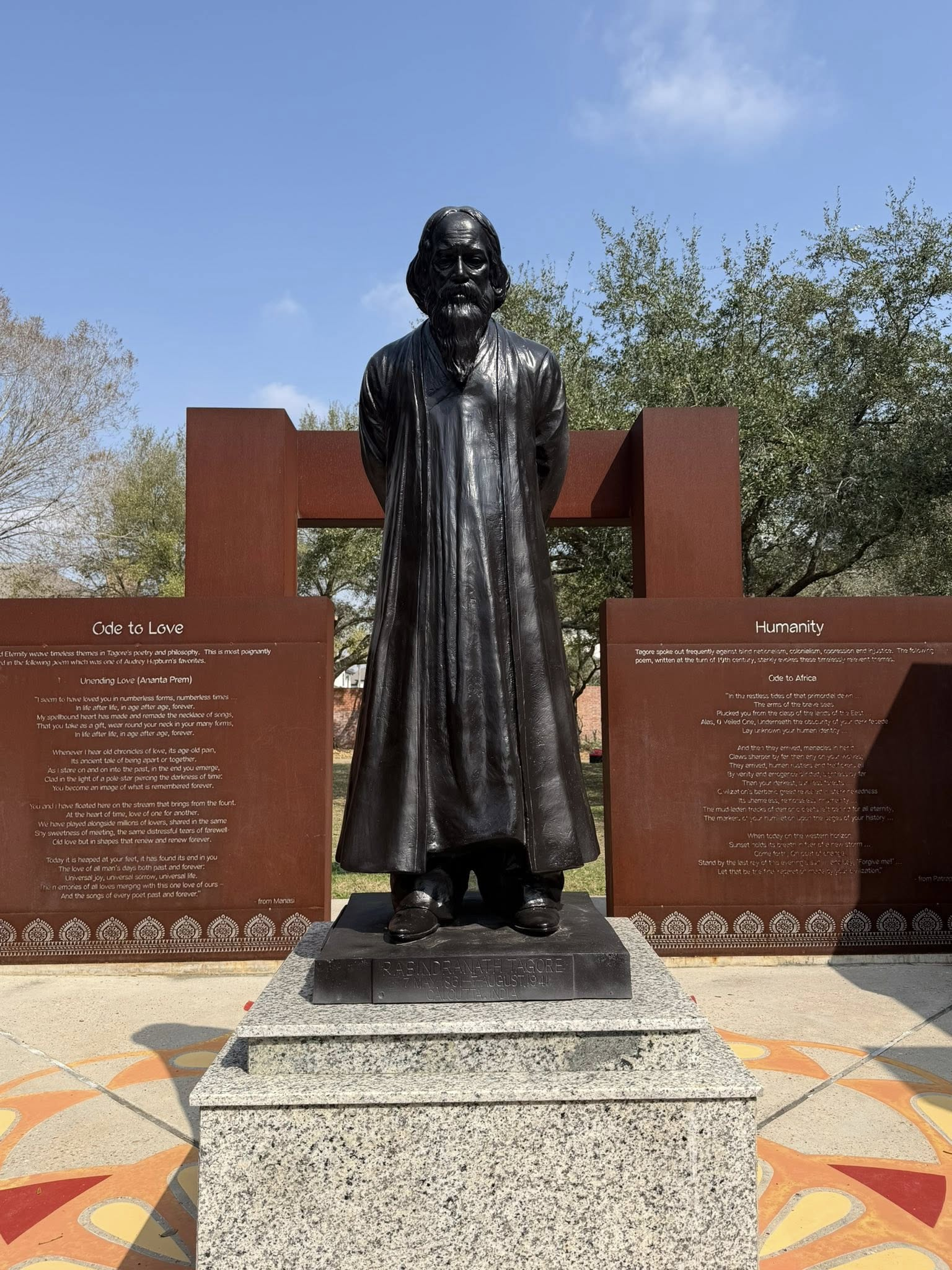
Tagore Memorial Grove Park in Houston, Texas

In Texas, the Dallas–Fort Worth metroplex—particularly Irving—has become a major Bengali hub. While the region is home to approximately 235,000 Indian Americans, the Bangladeshi Bengali population is expanding rapidly, driven by employment opportunities and a lower cost of living. Meanwhile, Sugar Land near Houston has gained popularity among educated and economically established Bengalis. Community life in the Houston area is strongly supported by organizations such as the Bangladesh American Society of Greater Houston and the Tagore Society of Houston, both of which play active roles in cultural programming, social networking, and the preservation of Bengali identity in Texas.

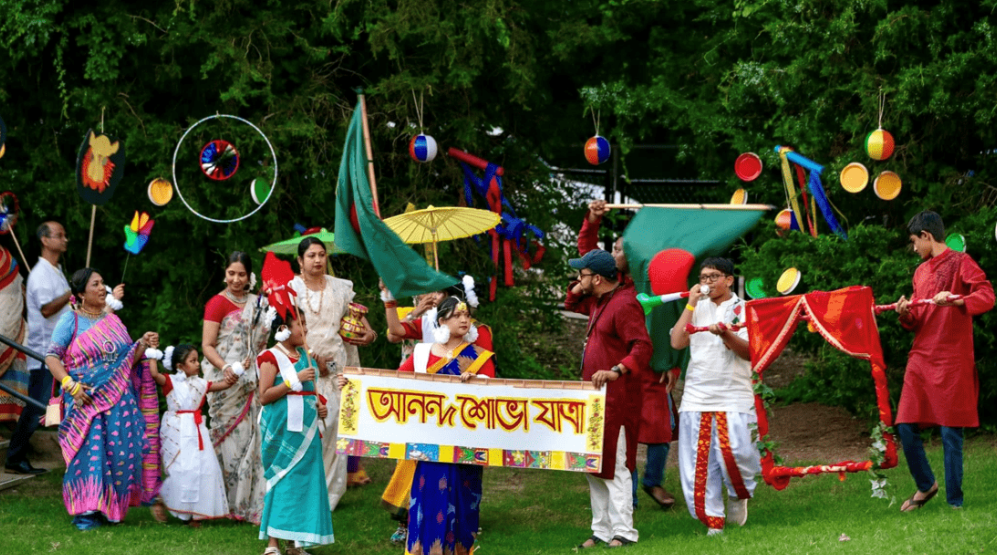
2024 Boishakhi Mela, Dallas, Texas

=== Chicago and the American Midwest ===
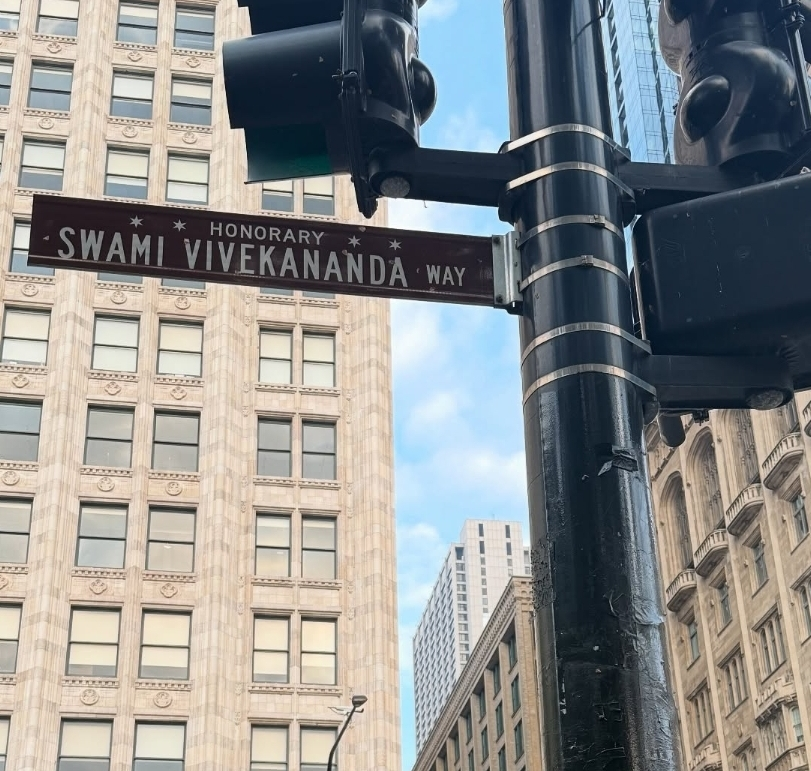
Honorary Swami Vivekananda WAY at Chicago

Chicago has been a site of South Asian settlement in the American Midwest, including populations of Bangladeshi origin. Devon Avenue is documented as a center of South Asian commercial and residential activity in the city. Portions of the avenue have been officially designated as Sheikh Mujibur Rahman Way and Ziaur Rahman Way, reflecting municipal recognition of the Bangladeshi community's presence in Chicago. In Chicago, an honorary street designation known as Swami Vivekananda Way commemorates Swami Vivekananda and his 1893 address in the city. His appearance is historically associated with the Parliament of the World's Religions, an event that contributed to his international prominence.

Chicago is also home to a population of Rohingya refugees, with documented settlement in the West Ridge area. Community activities in this neighborhood include efforts related to the maintenance of linguistic, cultural, and social practices. The presence of Rohingya residents forms part of the broader landscape of South Asian and Bangladeshi-associated communities in the American Midwest.

=== Other important Bengali enclaves and institutions in the United States ===
Region / State	City / Area	Notable Enclave or Institution	Community Profile
Washington, D.C. Metro Area	Seven Corners, Virginia	Residential & commercial enclave	One of the most visible Bengali concentrations in Northern Virginia
	Hyattsville, Maryland	Community hub	Strong presence of Bangladeshi families and small businesses
Georgia	Atlanta	Bengali Association of Greater Atlanta (BAGA)	Hindu Cultural leadership, language programs, festivals
Florida	Orlando	Bengali Society of Florida	Active Hindu cultural and social organization
	Miami	Informal Bengali networks	Growing population in hospitality and service sectors
Massachusetts	Cambridge	University-centered community	High concentration of Bengali students and academics
	Somerville	Student-dominant enclave	Closely linked to nearby universities
New York (Upstate)	Buffalo	Broadway–Fillmore area	Emerging Bengali and South Asian settlement

== Religious diversity ==
Bengali Americans represent a religiously diverse population. While Bengali Muslims constitute the vast majority, the community also includes adherents of Hinduism, Buddhism, and Christianity, reflecting a range of religious affiliations within the population.

Religions among Bengali Americans (Note: This estimate is based on the data and sources cited in this article. Among Bangladeshis, the proportion of Muslim and Hindu Bengalis is about 91% and 8%, while among Indian Bengalis it is about 68% (Bengali Hindus) and 30% (Bengali Muslims). Using these proportions, along with the presence of Bangladeshi and Indian Bengalis in the United States, this approximate calculation has been made. If you find different proportions based on reliable sources, please mention them here with proper citations.)
1. Bengali Muslims (80.0%)
2. Bengali Hindus (18.0%)
3. Bengali Buddhists (1.00%)
4. Bengali Christians (1.00%)

=== Islam ===
More than 80 percent of Bengali Americans identify as Bengali Muslim. This proportion is comparatively high among Bangladeshi-origin immigrant populations in North America. In major areas of Bengali settlement, mosques serve as primary sites for religious practice and community gatherings. Institutions such as the Jamaica Muslim Center and the Al-Islah Islamic Center provide spaces for worship as well as community-oriented activities, including assistance for recently arrived immigrants.

=== Hinduism ===
Bengali Hindus constitute approximately 15 to 18 percent of the Bengali American population. A significant portion originates from West Bengal, along with a smaller number of minority Hindu families from Bangladesh. Their social and cultural life is largely organized around major religious festivals such as Durga Puja, Saraswati Puja, and Lakshmi Puja. A strong Bengali Hindu presence can be observed in temples across New York and New Jersey, particularly during these festivals.

=== Buddhism and Christianity ===
Approximately 1 percent of Bengali Americans identify as Buddhist, and another 1 percent as Christian. Bengali Buddhists are primarily members of the Barua community from the Chittagong region, who have established monasteries and temples in areas such as Brooklyn and Virginia. Bengali Christians are affiliated with various mainline denominations; however, they often maintain their linguistic and cultural traditions, particularly in the celebration of Christmas.

Religion	Estimated Share	Major Festivals	Notable Religious Centers
Islam	More than 80%	Eid al-Fitr, Eid al-Adha	Jamaica Muslim Center, mosques in Hamtramck
Hinduism	15%–18%	Durga Puja, Kali Puja	Various Hindu temples and cultural associations
Buddhism	~1%	Buddha Purnima	Sadhanananda International Buddhist Monastery, Brooklyn
Christianity	~1%	Christmas	Local churches and private gatherings

== Festivals and celebrations ==
=== Culture and language practices ===
Language (Bengali) serves as a significant marker of identity among Bengali Americans. More than 91 percent of Bangladeshi Bengali households in the United States use the Bengali language at home. This attachment to language and culture has motivated Bengali communities across the country to establish various institutional initiatives aimed at preserving their heritage.

Institutions such as Bangladeshi American Center of North America (BACONA) in New York and Path Bhavan in Michigan play an important role in transmitting the Bengali language to younger generations. Bengali language courses are also offered at institutions of higher education, including the University of Pennsylvania and the University of Wisconsin–Madison. In addition, Muktadhara Bookstore in New York is widely recognized as the principal hub for Bengali literature in North America.

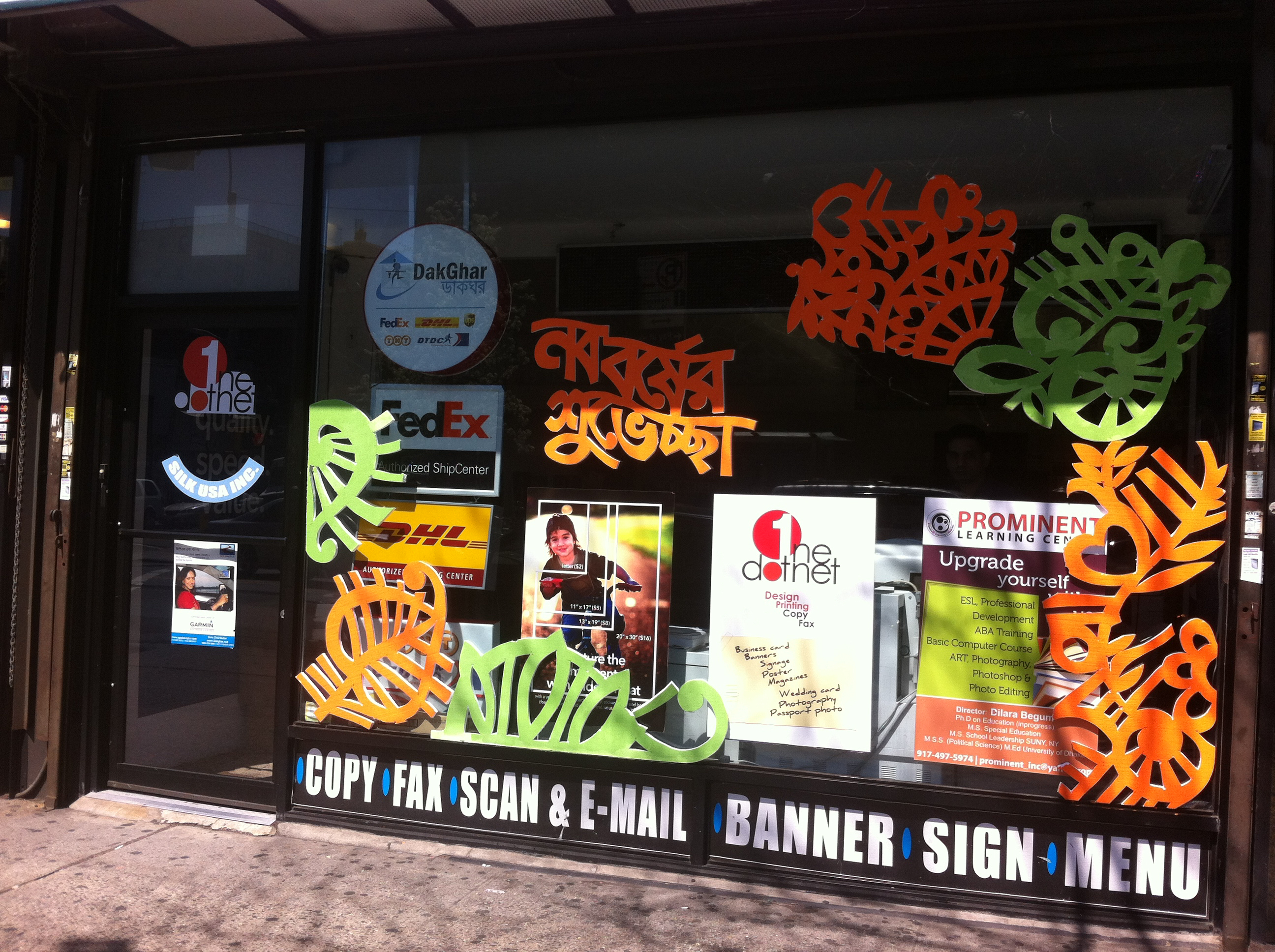
Decorations for Pohela Boishakh at Jackson Heights

Rabindra Sangeet, Nazrul Geeti, and folk traditions such as Baul music remain integral to Bengali cultural identity. Inspired by the ideals of Chhayanaut, many Bengali instructors offer music education both online and offline. The Tagore Society of Houston works to promote the philosophy and cultural legacy of Rabindranath Tagore, with regular participation from second-generation Bengali Americans.

Traditional Bengali cuisine continues to play a central role in Bengali American households, with rice and fish, bhorta, and pitha remaining staples. The consumption of panta ilish during Pohela Boishakh has become a global Bengali tradition. In terms of dress, women often prefer sarees and salwar kameez, while men commonly wear panjabi or fatua, particularly during cultural and religious festivals.

=== Pohela Boishakh ===
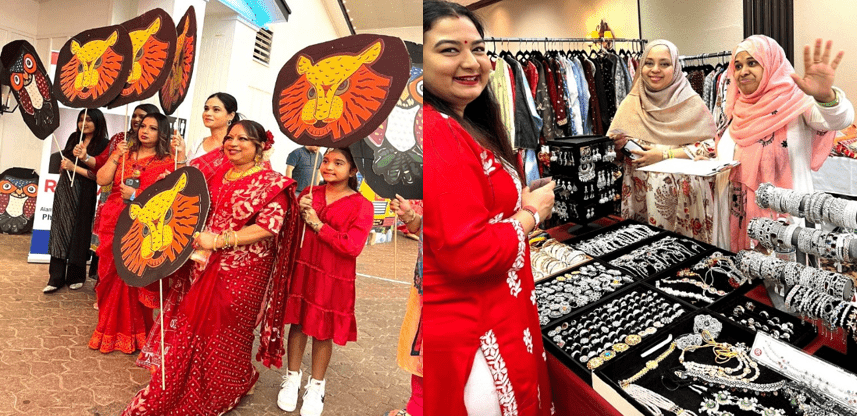
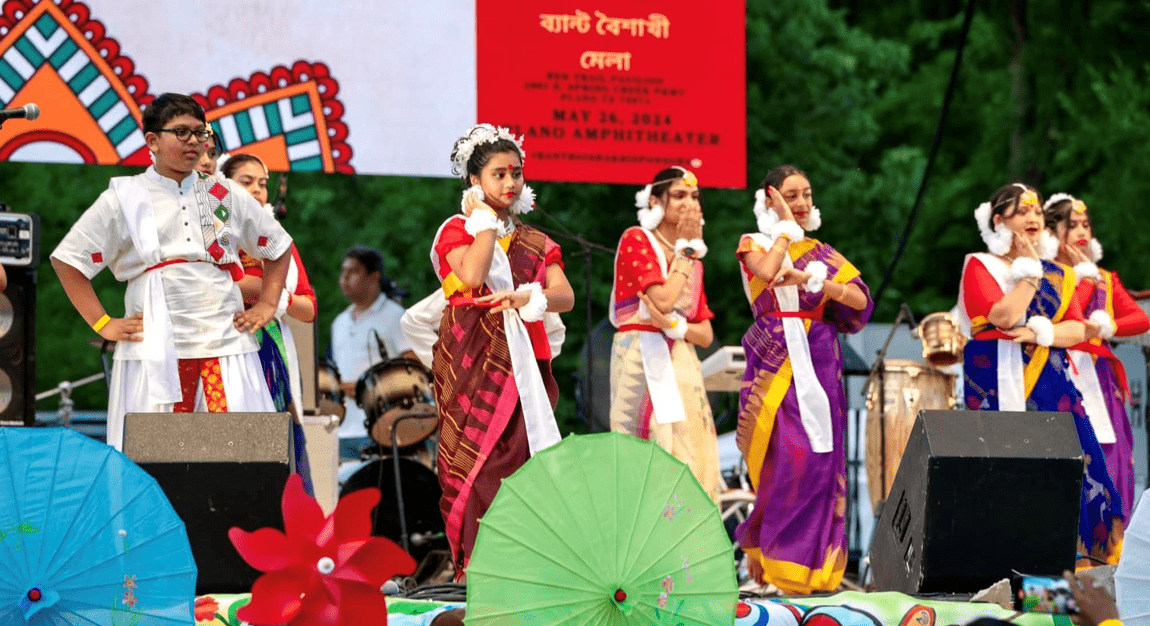
Boishakh celebartions at Dallas, Texas

Pohela Boishakh, the Bengali New Year, has now become the largest non-sectarian Bengali festival in North America. It is not merely the beginning of a new calendar year; rather, it represents a powerful expression of Bengali linguistic pride and cultural identity. In states such as New York, New Jersey, Texas, and California, Boishakhi Melas have evolved into an annual tradition, drawing large crowds from across the Bengali diaspora.

=== Eid-ul-Fitr and Eid-ul-Adha ===
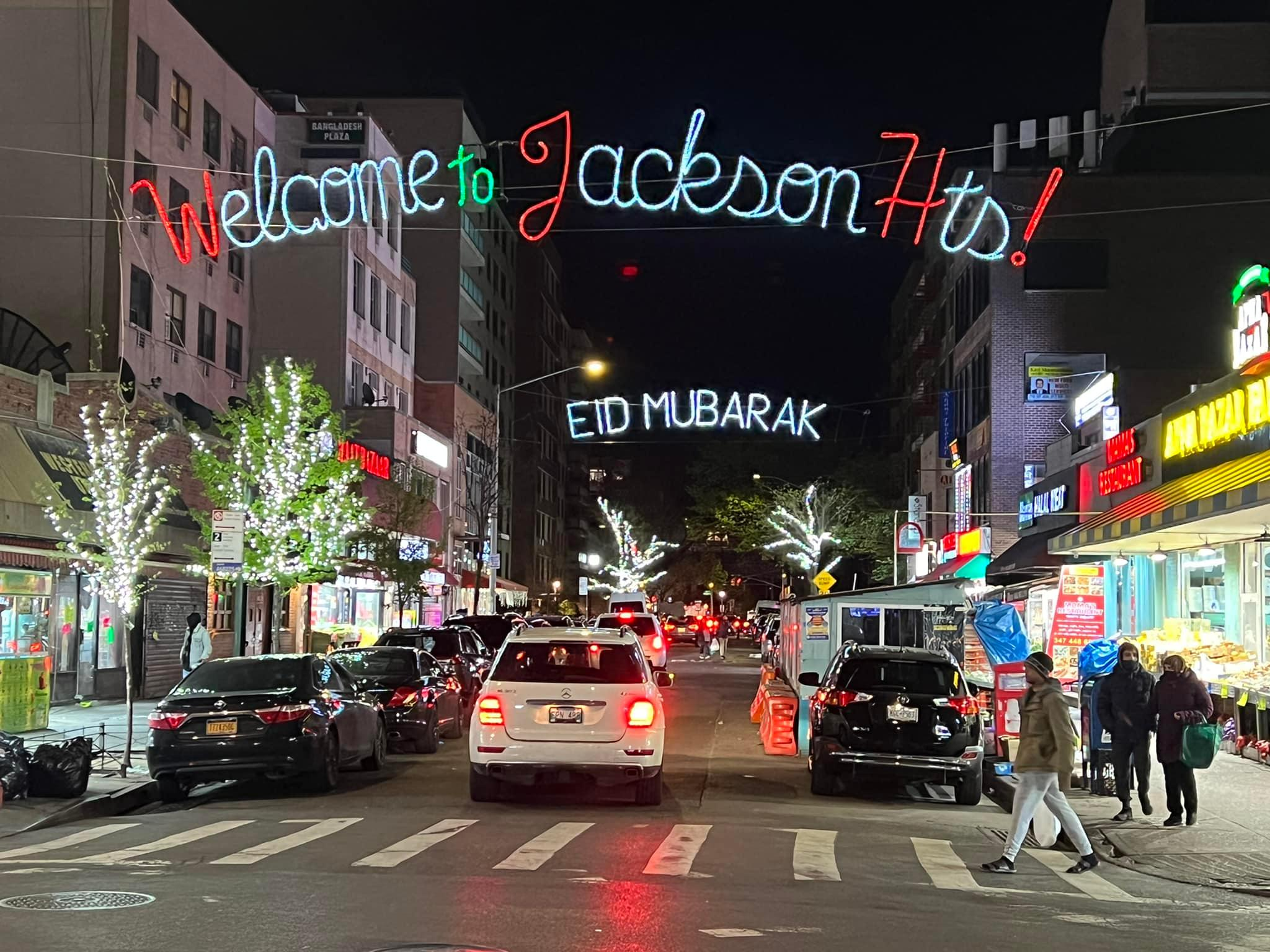
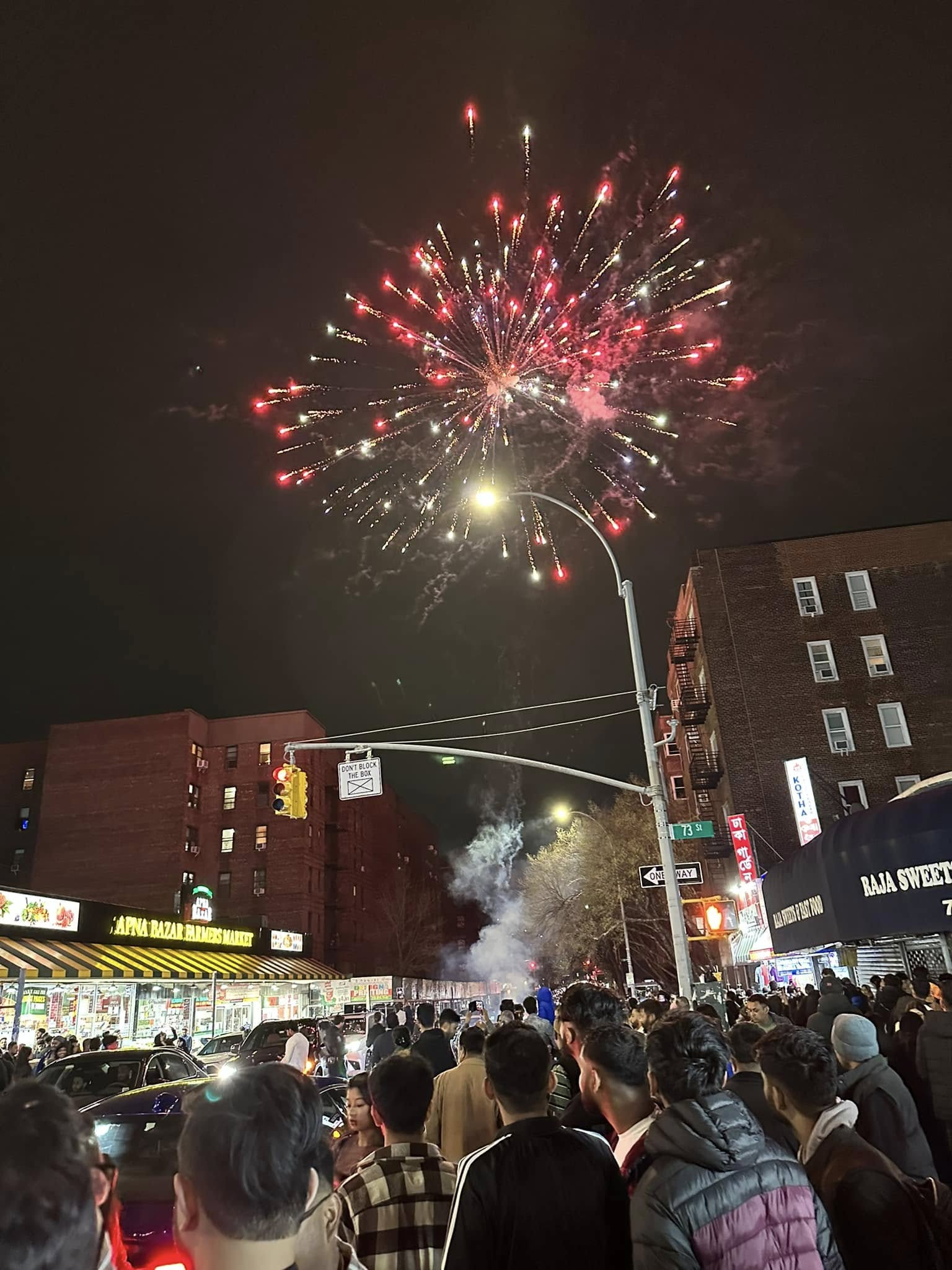
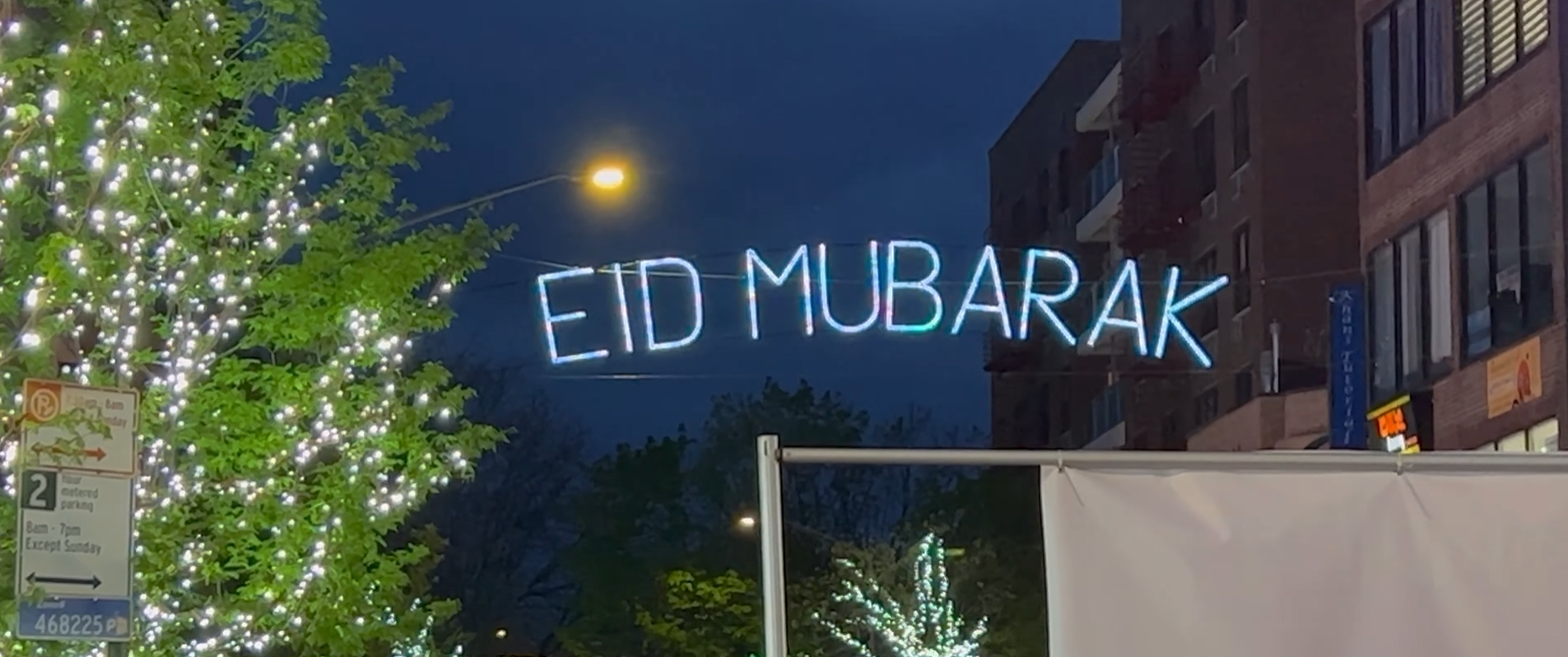
Eid celebrations in Jackson Heights

Among Bengali American Muslims, Eid is a major religious observance with an important communal dimension. Congregational Eid prayers are held in multiple locations, including neighborhoods in New York City such as Jamaica, Brooklyn, and Queens, as well as at venues such as Exposition Park in Los Angeles and open grounds in Orange County.

Following the prayers, people exchange embraces and greetings of “Eid Mubarak,” and gather for family feasts featuring traditional dishes such as shemai, firni, and biryani. The night before Eid-ul-Fitr, known as Chaand Raat, is especially popular. During the Chaand Raat Mela, activities such as applying henna, buying bangles, and showcasing new clothes create a festive atmosphere. In Bengali-populated areas, particularly Jackson Heights, Chaand Raat draws large crowds and turns into a vibrant social gathering of Bengali community that extends late into the night.

=== Durga Puja ===
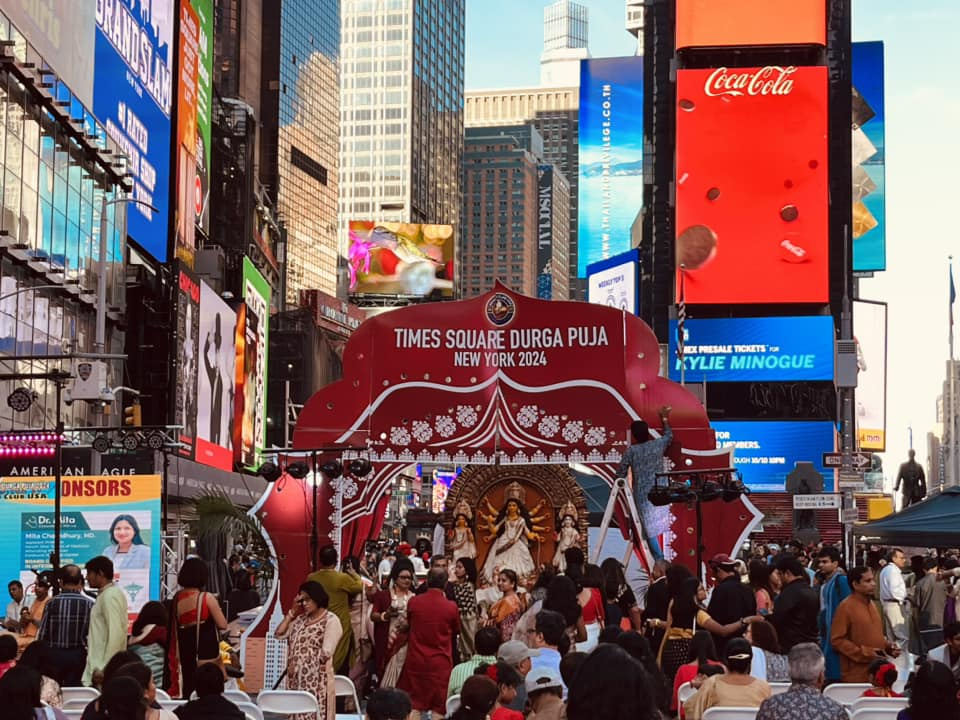
Durga Puja at Times Square

In the United States, Durga Puja is not merely a religious ritual; it is a major social and cultural event for the Bengali Hindu community. Puja celebrations generally follow two models: barowari (community-based) pujas and temple-centered pujas. Due to work commitments, most pujas are held over weekends—popularly known as “Weekend Pujo.” Over the past few decades, significant changes have taken place in puja practices. In earlier years, idols were imported from India, making them heavy and difficult to immerse. Today, there is a growing use of lightweight idols made from materials such as shola, which are easier to manage and more environmentally friendly.

In New York City, cultural Durga Puja celebrations have been held at Times Square since the early 2020s, reflecting the growing visibility of the Bengali Hindu community in prominent public spaces.

=== Ekushey February (International Mother Language Day) ===
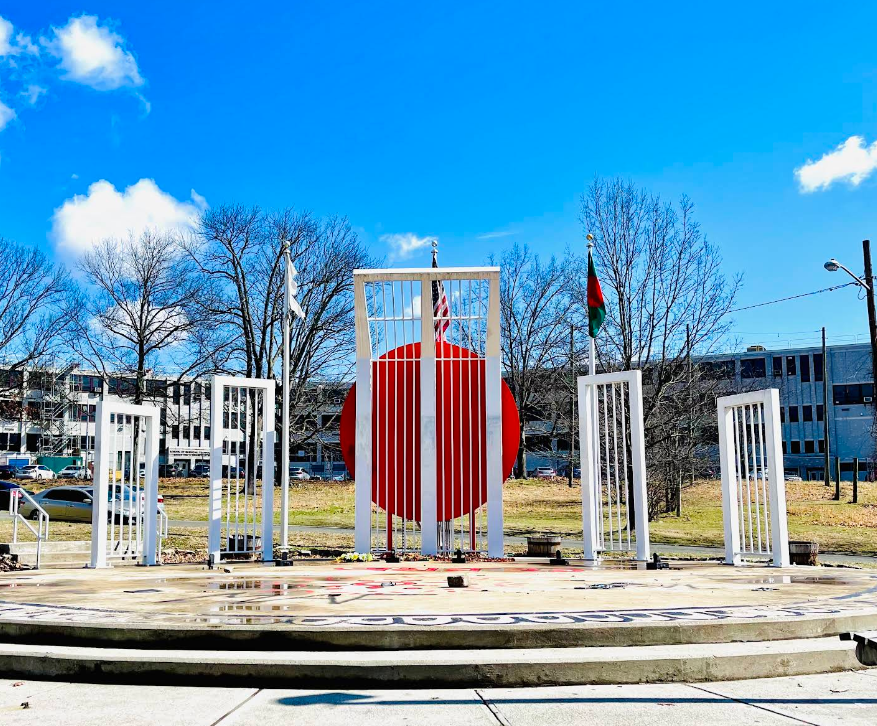
Shaheed Minar in Paterson, New Jersey

Tributes are paid at the Shaheed Minar in Paterson, New Jersey. In New York, temporary Shaheed Minars are constructed along Hillside Avenue and in Jackson Heights, Queens, where people pay tribute at 12:01 a.m. Probhat Pheri (early-morning procession) is also organized to commemorate the occasion. Families often dress their children in red-and-white outfits adorned with Bengali letters, using the occasion to raise awareness about the Bengali language and cultural heritage among the younger generation. Book fairs are also held.

External videos
- International Mother Language Day | Probhat Pheri tradition of Bangladesh organized by BAFA

=== Victory Day and Independence Day ===
On 16 December and 26 March, Bangladeshi organizations across the United States organize Victory Day fairs and Independence Day cultural programs. These events primarily feature patriotic songs, short theatrical performances, and discussion sessions focused on Bangladesh's history, liberation struggle, and national identity.

=== North American Bengali Conference (NABC / Banga Sammelan) ===
The North American Bengali Conference (NABC) began its journey in 1981 in New York, founded by the Cultural Association of Bengal (CAB). While the conference originally emerged as a gathering place primarily for Bengalis from West Bengal and the broader Indian Bengali community, it has since evolved into a truly transnational forum that attracts Bengalis from around the world.

NABC is an annual Bengali cultural conference held in the United States and Canada, typically around the July 4 weekend, and is hosted each year by a different local organization. The conference features a wide range of activities, including cultural performances, literary readings, panel discussions, professional networking sessions, and class reunions.

Performers and speakers often come from the United States, Canada, India, and Bangladesh, reflecting the conference's broad geographic reach. The audience is similarly diverse, consisting mainly of Bengali Americans, Indian Americans, Bangladeshi Americans, Indian Canadians, and Bangladeshi Canadians. Over the decades, NABC has become one of the largest and most influential annual gatherings for the Indian Bengali diaspora in North America, serving as a major platform for cultural expression, community bonding, and intergenerational connection.

=== Culinary Traditions and Food Culture ===
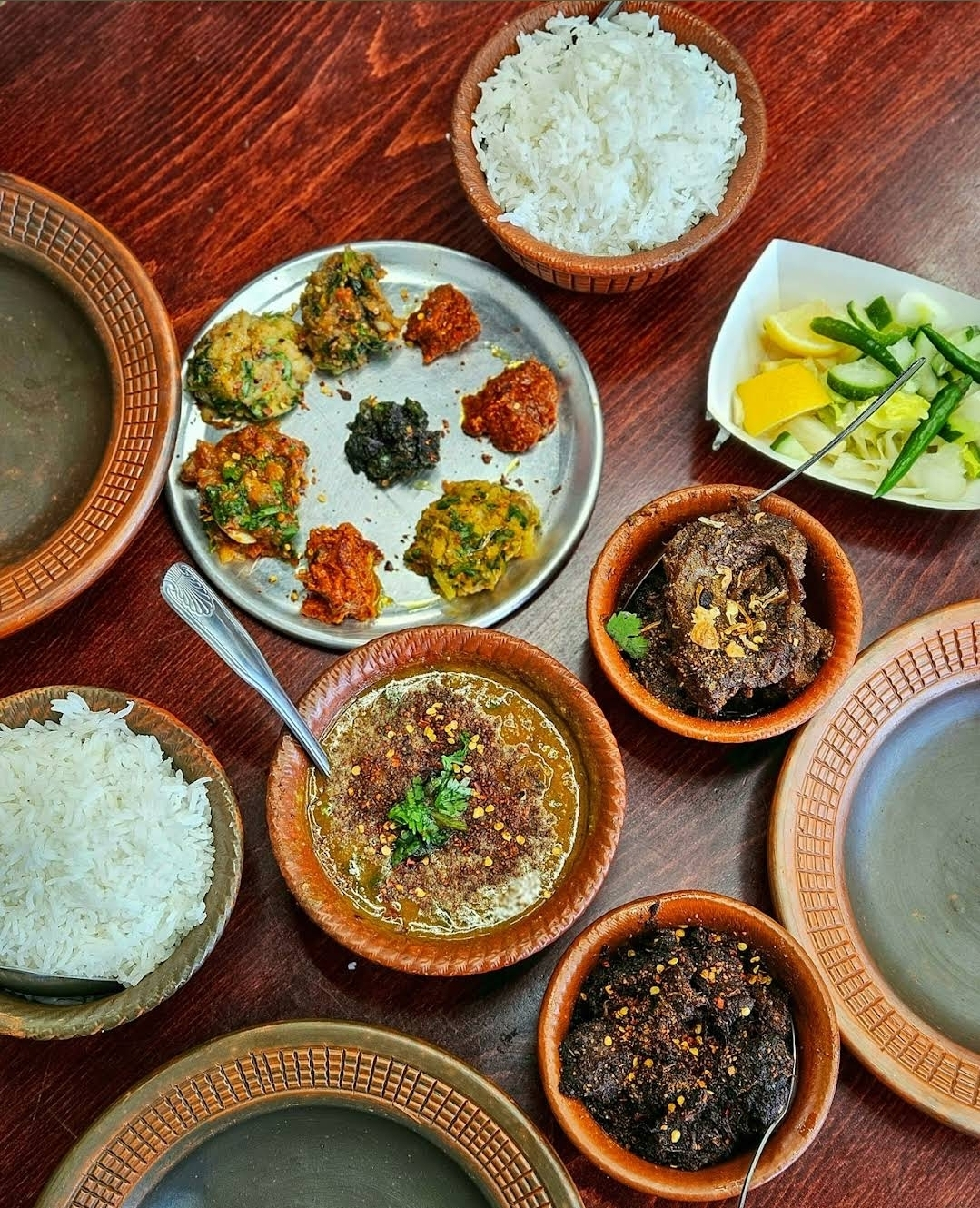
Bengali cuisine at Jackson Heights, NYC

Food lies at the heart of Bengali celebrations. In the United States, the growth of Bengali grocery stores and online platforms such as MonBangla has made it easier for members of the diaspora to access familiar and preferred ingredients close to home. Dishes featuring ilish, rui, pabda, and kala bhuna remain indispensable elements of festive menus.

Several restaurants—such as Chang Pai—serve Bengali-style Chinese cuisine, a food tradition that is extremely popular in Bangladesh and has been successfully recreated in diaspora settings.

No Bengali celebration is complete without sweets. Rasgulla (which gained popularity in Kolkata in 1868), rasmalai (popularized in the 1930s by the Sen brothers of Cumilla), and sandesh regularly appear on festive tables abroad. These sweets, made from chhana under Dutch-era influence, evoke a deep sense of childhood nostalgia among expatriate Bengalis.

In addition, during festivals, tong or fuchka carts—such as Tong and others along Hillside Avenue in New York—become major attractions for the younger generation, adding a vibrant street-food dimension to Bengali cultural celebrations in the United States.

== Bengali language in the electoral process ==
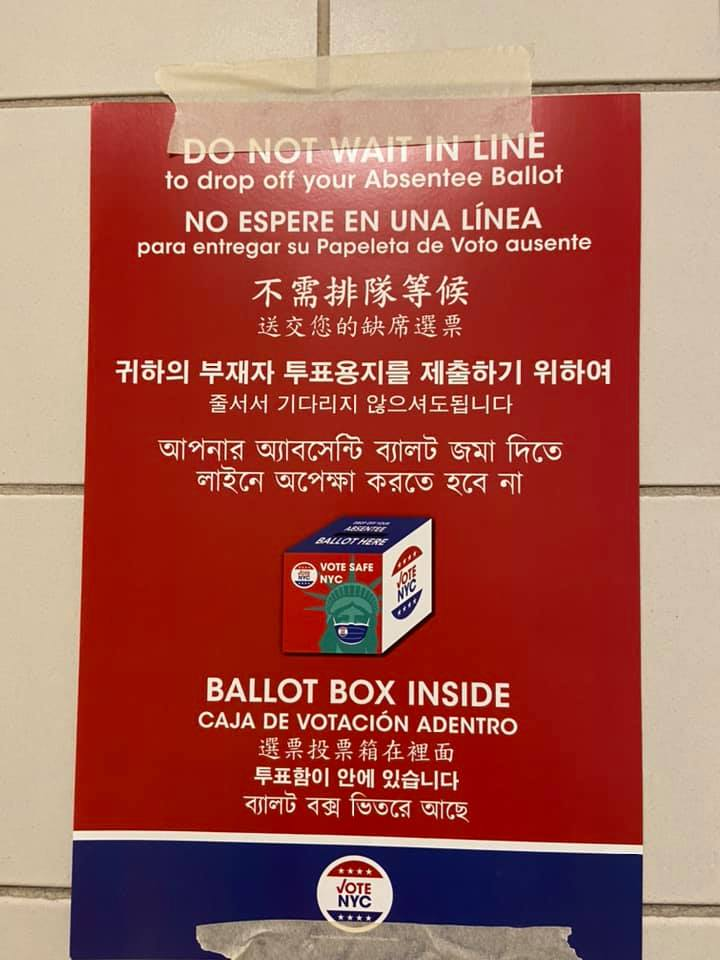
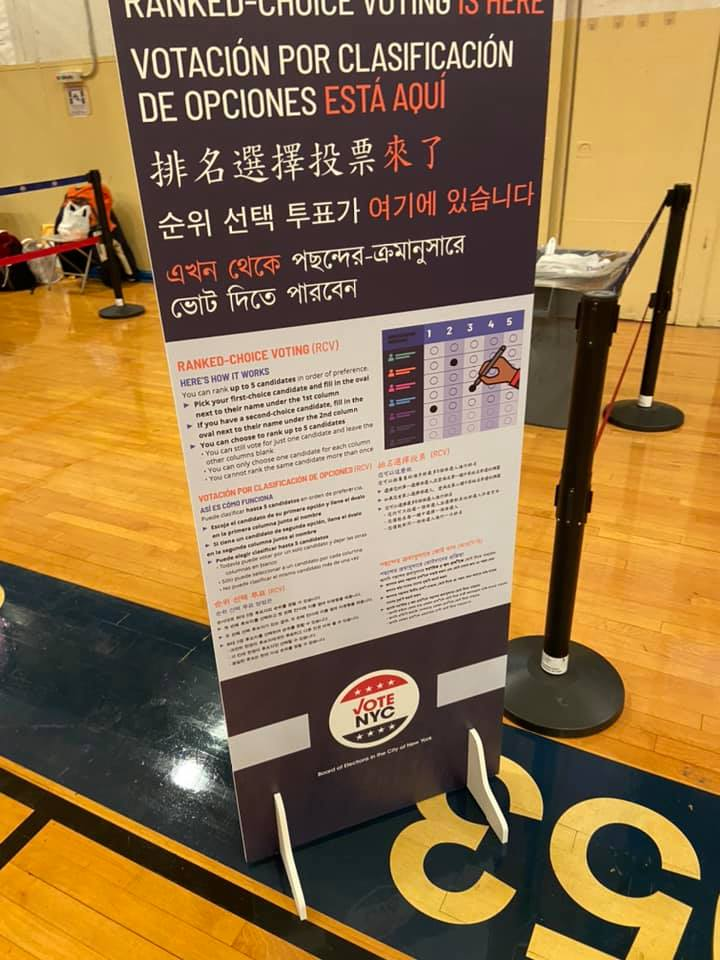
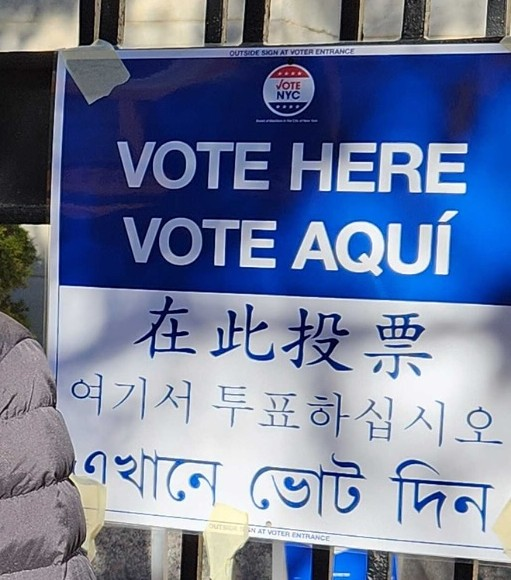
Bengali in US election

The inclusion of the Bengali language in the electoral system of the United States is largely the direct result of the demographic presence of Bangladeshi Americans, organized civil rights advocacy, and sustained legal challenges. Although, in principle, the use of Bengali applies to all Bengali-speaking communities, in practice electoral recognition of the language in states such as New York and Michigan has been established primarily through the demands, litigation, and activism of voters of Bangladeshi origin.

The legal foundation for securing these language rights was established through Section 203 of the Voting Rights Act, which was added in 1975. This provision mandates that jurisdictions in which a linguistic minority population exceeds a specified threshold and where a significant number of voters have limited English proficiency must provide ballots and election-related assistance in the relevant minority language.

Increased civic engagement has led to the election of Bengali-speaking officials, such as Shahana Hanif (NYC Council) and various local leaders in Michigan and New Jersey. It is sometimes claimed online that “Bangla is the only Indian language featured on New York City ballots.” This claim is both linguistically misleading and politically misframed. Bengali language was not included on NYC ballots as an “Indian language.” Rather, its inclusion reflects the size of the Bangla-speaking population in the city— a population that is overwhelmingly composed of Bangladeshi Americans.

=== New York City ===
The establishment of Bengali-language electoral services in New York City was decisively shaped by the efforts of Bangladeshi Americans. Following the 2011 census determination that Queens County qualified for Asian-language assistance, organizations representing the county's large Bangladeshi population asserted that such assistance must be provided specifically in the Bengali language. When the New York City Board of Elections failed to provide Bengali-language ballots and materials in multiple elections in 2012, Bangladeshi American organizations initiated legal action. These cases were supported by Bangladeshi-led community groups in collaboration with Asian American legal advocacy organizations.

After prolonged legal proceedings, a settlement agreement was reached in federal court in 2013. As a result, Bengali-language ballots were introduced for the first time in Queens County during that year's mayoral election. This achievement is widely regarded as a historic success of organized political mobilization by Bangladeshi Americans.

In 2024, under new New York State election laws, Bengali-language electoral assistance was also extended to Kings County (Brooklyn). This expansion was similarly grounded in the presence of a substantial Bangladeshi American voter population in the area. Consequently, Bengali has become an established and functional electoral language in multiple counties across New York State.

The rate of participation among Bengali voters is comparable to, and in some cases higher than, the overall voter participation rate in New York City. In the 2021 primary election, voter turnout among Bangladeshi voters was 29.1 percent, higher than that of Pakistani voters (24.7 percent) and Korean voters (23.3 percent). Bengali-language media campaigns by organizations such as the AAPI Power Coalition were able to engage more than 1.5 million voters.

External videos
- Zohran Mamdani is campaigning for votes by speaking in the Bengali language.

During the 2025 New York City mayoral election, mayoral candidate Zohran Mamdani personally conducted campaign outreach in the Bengali language among the Bangladeshi American community. Shahana Hanif is a Bengali American politician serving as a member of the New York City Council. She is the first Bangladeshi American and the first Bengali American woman elected to the council.

=== Hamtramck, Michigan ===
The recognition of the Bengali language in the electoral process in Hamtramck, Michigan, was an even more direct outcome of sustained advocacy by Bangladeshi Americans. Owing to the city's large population of Bangladeshi origin, Hamtramck has fallen under the provisions of Section 203 of the Voting Rights Act since 2011. However, for an extended period, the law was not effectively implemented in practice, and Bengali-speaking voters repeatedly encountered language barriers at polling stations.

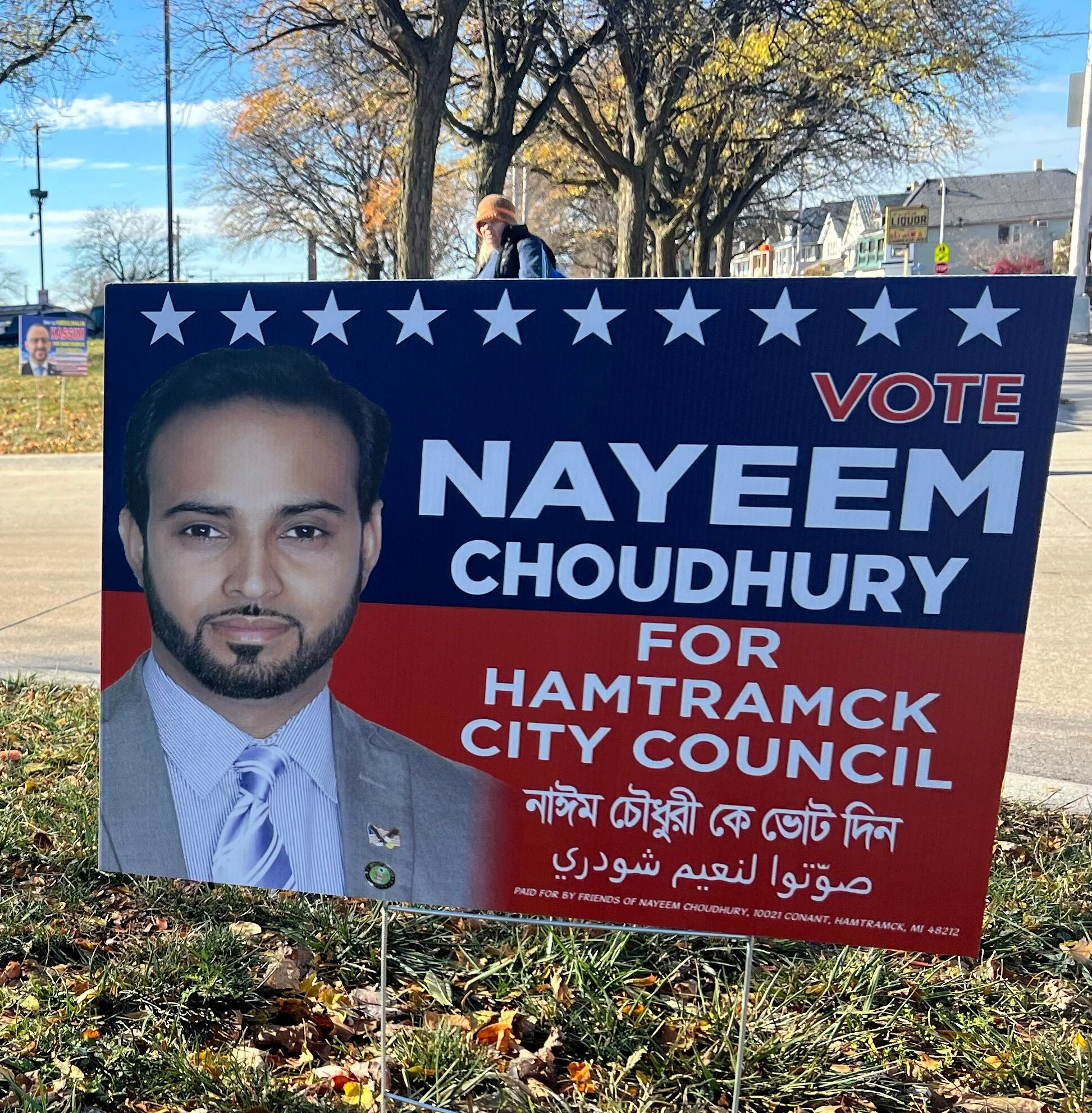
Vote campaign in Bengali language at Hamtramck, Michigan, USA

Against this backdrop, a federal lawsuit was filed in 2021 on behalf of a Bangladeshi American voter, Rahima Begum. The complaint alleged that polling places in Hamtramck lacked Bengali-language ballots, signage, and interpreter services, thereby violating the legally protected rights of Bangladeshi voters. The court took cognizance of these claims and issued a consent decree, under which city authorities were required to translate all election-related materials into Bengali, appoint a designated Bengali election program coordinator, and establish an advisory committee comprising representatives of the Bangladeshi community.

This ruling is widely regarded as a historic victory for Bangladeshi Americans in Hamtramck and established an important legal precedent for the enforcement of Bengali-language voting rights in the United States.

=== New Jersey & Pennsylvania ===
Beyond New York and Michigan, political demand for Bengali-language electoral services is also growing in other states. In New Jersey, Middlesex County is currently covered under Section 203 of the Voting Rights Act only for Gujarati-language assistance. However, the county's large Bangladeshi population has increasingly called for the inclusion of Bengali-language services. In areas such as Paterson's Ward 2, Bengali voters often play a decisive role in determining electoral outcomes, with an estimated core electorate of approximately 2,000–2,200 voters.

In Pennsylvania, Philadelphia County is presently federally covered only for Chinese-language assistance. However, in 2024 the Pennsylvania Department of State began providing voter registration forms and ballot application materials in nine additional languages, including Bengali. This development indicates that Bengali-language ballots may become a legal reality in these states in the near future.

== Clubs and organizations ==
In the United States, there are numerous organizations and clubs established by the Bengali community. Some of these are primarily ethnic in nature, focusing on shared linguistic and cultural heritage. Others are religious organizations centered on faith-based activities. There are also groups that promote both ethnocultural and religious traditions, while some organizations mainly emphasize national identity, bringing together Bengali Americans around a shared sense of origin and community.

=== Bengalis of New York (BONY) ===
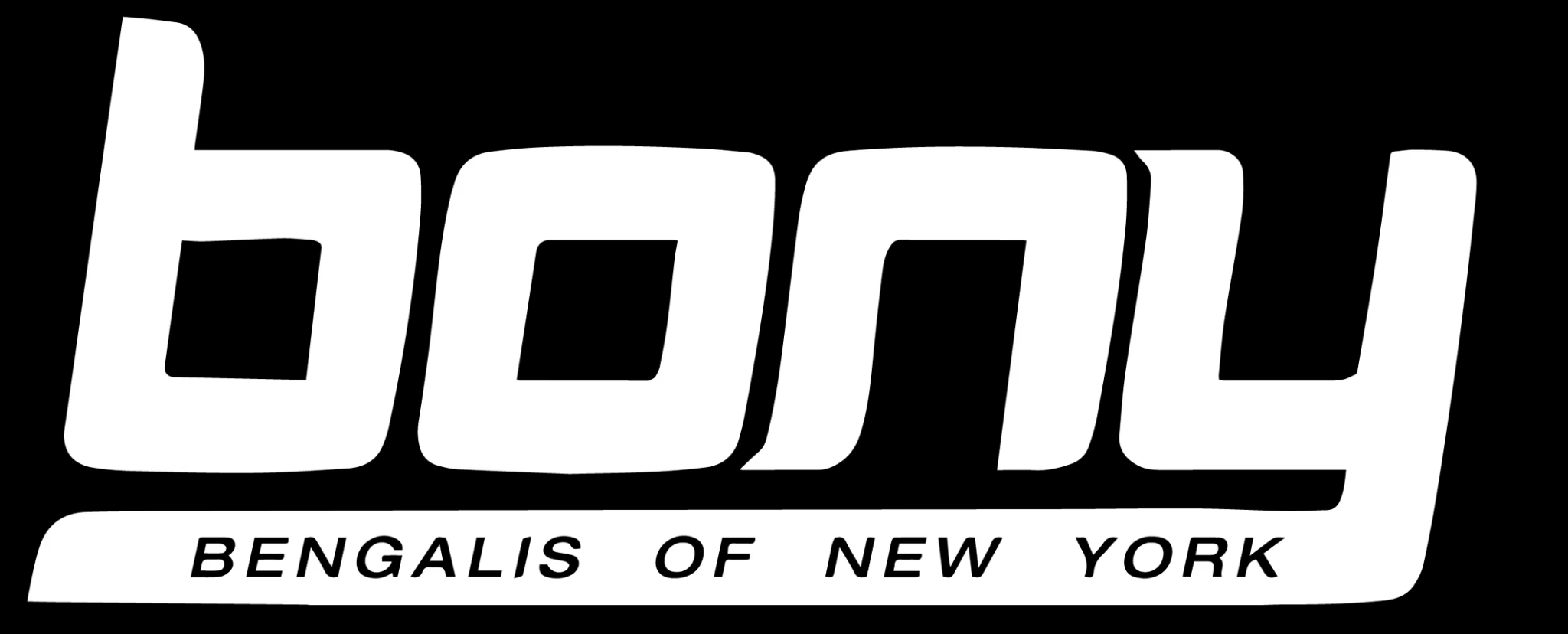
Bengalis of New York (BONY)

Bengalis of New York (BONY) is a community-based cultural platform focused on documenting and promoting Bengali culture and diaspora life in New York City. The initiative began in 2018 as a photography and videography project that documented Bengali street-food vendors and small businesses across New York. Over time, the project expanded to include podcasts, community events, and cultural programs aimed at connecting members of the Bengali diaspora. The team also produced a short documentary film based on their recordings, which was showcased at the first New York Bengali Film Festival (NYBFF) in 2023. The platform has since been involved in organizing the festival annually, featuring filmmaker discussions and cultural programming related to Bengali cinema and arts.

Through digital storytelling and public events, Bengalis of New York documents the experiences of Bengali communities in New York and the broader diaspora.

=== Cultural Association of Bengal (CAB) ===
The Cultural Association of Bengal (CAB) was founded in New York in 1971 by Indian Bengali immigrants with the aim of promoting the literature, arts, and Bengali Hindu cultural heritage of West Bengal. Over time, the organization expanded its activities across North America, including the United States and Canada, encouraging cultural exchange and community engagement among people of Bengali origin.

The association marked its golden jubilee in 2020. CAB operates through a membership structure and is administered by an elected executive committee, while broader policy matters are overseen by a board of trustees.

=== Federation of Bangladeshi Associations in North America (FOBANA) ===
The Federation of Bangladeshi Associations in North America (FOBANA), founded in 1987, is an umbrella organization representing numerous Bangladeshi community associations across the United States and Canada. It coordinates activities among member organizations and promotes cultural and social engagement within the Bangladeshi diaspora. FOBANA organizes an annual convention, first held in Washington, D.C., in 1987. The convention is typically hosted over the Labor Day weekend in a different North American city each year by one of its member organizations selected in advance at the Annual General Meeting. The event includes cultural performances, panel discussions, and exhibitions related to Bangladeshi culture and diaspora issues.

To support its activities, FOBANA operates through a network of standing committees that oversee various social, cultural, and organizational initiatives across North America.

=== North American Bangladeshi Islamic Community (NABIC) ===
The North American Bangladeshi Islamic Community (NABIC) is a nonprofit, nonpartisan organization founded in 1990 that works with Bangladeshi communities in North America and Bangladesh. The organization supports social and humanitarian initiatives aimed at improving living conditions and promoting community development. NABIC has been involved in projects related to healthcare, education, poverty alleviation, and emergency relief. Its activities are overseen by a board of directors representing members from different professional backgrounds across several states in the United States.

=== Others ===
- Bengali American Boldest Association (BABA) - an organization that brings together correctional officers and civilian personnel of Bengali heritage, promoting professional support, recruitment, community engagement, and assistance for members and their families.
- Bengali Club USA - nonprofit organization based in New York City that promotes Bengali Hindu culture and community through cultural events, religious observances, and community outreach initiatives.
- Bangladeshi American Police Association (BAPA) - a professional organization founded in 2015 that promotes cooperation among law enforcement officers of Bangladeshi heritage and works to strengthen relations between law enforcement and the Bangladeshi American community.
- Bangladesh Society Inc. - a community organization in the United States that works to promote Bangladeshi culture, heritage, and social connections among members of the Bangladeshi diaspora.
- Dakshini Bengali Association of California - a nonprofit cultural organization founded in 1985 in Torrance, California, that promotes social, cultural, and community activities among people of South Asian origin in Southern California.
- Bangladeshi American Business Association (BABA) - a business organization founded in 2023 in Houston, Texas, that promotes networking, collaboration, and advocacy among Bangladeshi American entrepreneurs and professionals.
- Bangladesh Law Society USA Inc. (BLS) - a nonprofit professional organization in the United States that brings together Bangladeshi law graduates and promotes legal, educational, and community-oriented initiatives.
- Bengali Association of Southern California (BASC) - a nonprofit cultural organization that promotes Bengali Hindu heritage and community activities in Southern California and operates Bengali-language schools such as Pathshala and Pathbhaban.

=== Clubs at universities ===
==== Bengali Association of Students at Harvard College (Harvard BASHA) ====
The Bengali Association of Students at Harvard (BASHA) is a student organization at Harvard University that promotes Bengali culture and community among students with connections to Bangladesh, West Bengal, and the wider Bengali diaspora. The organization's name derives from the Bengali word basha (বাসা), meaning “home.” The organization emerged from informal student networking initiatives in 2019, when Bengali students began connecting through an online group created to build a cultural community on campus. In 2020, students drafted a constitution and formalized BASHA as an official student organization at Harvard.

The group organizes social, cultural, and academic events, including celebrations of festivals such as Pohela Boishakh, Ramadan, Eid, Durga Puja, and International Mother Language Day. BASHA also provides a platform for both local and international Bengali students to engage with cultural traditions and connect with the broader Harvard community.

==== Bangladeshi Students Association at MIT (MIT BSA) ====
The MIT Bangladeshi Students’ Association is a student organization at the Massachusetts Institute of Technology that promotes Bangladeshi culture and community among students. The association organizes cultural, social, and academic events, including celebrations of national, cultural, and religious occasions, as well as talks and discussions featuring Bangladeshi scholars and public figures. It also engages in charitable initiatives and serves as a platform connecting Bangladeshi students at MIT with the wider Bangladeshi community in the Boston area.

== Participation and influence ==
=== Politics and public service ===
Individuals of Bengali origin have held positions within the United States federal government across a range of institutions. These roles have included appointments and staff positions within the White House and various federal agencies, indicating participation in multiple areas of federal administration and policymaking.

==== Federal government and policymaking ====
Zayn Siddique was appointed as Deputy Chief of Staff in the Biden–Harris administration. In this role, he serves in a senior administrative and advisory capacity within the White House. He received his higher education from Princeton University and Yale Law School, and previously was a law clerk to Elena Kagan at the Supreme Court of the United States.

The Office of Information and Regulatory Affairs (OIRA) is a unit within the Executive Office of the President that reviews significant federal regulations. The position of Associate Administrator at OIRA is held by Kazi Sabeel Rahman, a legal scholar who previously was president of the policy research organization Demos. In his role at OIRA, Rahman is involved in the federal regulatory review process and oversight of rulemaking activities across executive agencies.

===== National Institutes of Health (NIH) =====
In 2025, during the second administration of Donald Trump, Jay Bhattacharya was appointed as the 18th Director of the National Institutes of Health (NIH). Born in Kolkata, he is a physician and economist who was a professor at Stanford University, with research interests in public health and health economics. Bhattacharya received national and international attention during the COVID-19 pandemic as a co-author of the Great Barrington Declaration, which advocated an alternative public health strategy focused on targeted protection.

==== Judiciary ====
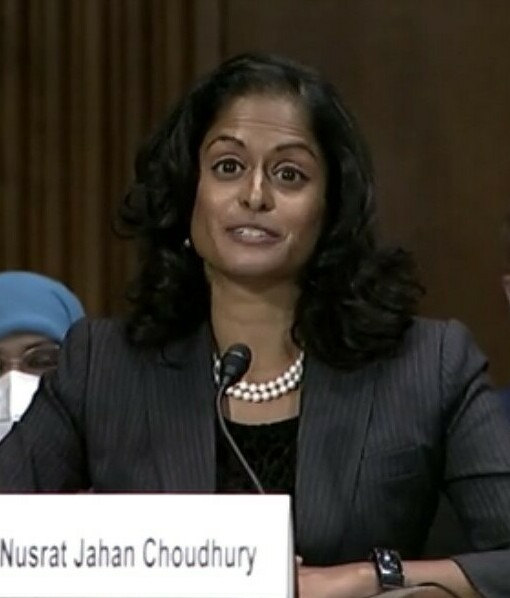
Nursat Choudhury

Individuals of Bengali origin have held judicial positions within the United States court system at both the federal and state levels.

In July 2023, Nusrat Jahan Choudhury was sworn in as a judge of the United States District Court for the Eastern District of New York. She became the first Muslim woman and the first Bengali American to serve as a federal judge in the United States. Judge Choudhury is a graduate of Yale Law School and previously worked as an attorney with the American Civil Liberties Union, where her work focused on civil rights–related litigation.

At the state level, Ajmeri Hoque has been a judge in Ohio.

==== U.S. Congress ====
The first Bengali origin to serve as a member of the U.S. Congress was Hansen Hashim Clarke. He represented Michigan's 13th Congressional District as a Democrat from 2011 to 2013. His father was an immigrant from Beanibazar in Sylhet. Clarke's political journey has been a source of inspiration for subsequent generations of Bengali Americans. At present, the Congressional Bangladesh Caucus plays an active role in advocating for issues relevant to the Bengali and Bangladeshi American community in Congress. The caucus is currently co-chaired by Nellie Pou and Joe Wilson, reflecting growing institutional recognition of Bangladeshi American interests at the federal legislative level.

==== State-level politics ====
At the state level, Bengali political success has been notable. Bengalis now play policymaking roles in the legislatures of Georgia, Virginia, Michigan, New Hampshire, and New York, reflecting a deepening integration into American state politics.

- Aboul Khan: Aboul Bashar Khan is an American politician of Bangladeshi descent who serves as a member of the New Hampshire House of Representatives from Rockingham District 20 since 2016. He previously represented the same district from 2012 to 2014. A senior political figure, he is widely recognized as a leading South Asian and Bengali voice within the Republican Party.
- Sheikh Rahman: Sheikh Rahman made history as the first Muslim and the first Bengali elected to the Georgia State Senate. He has served in this role since 2018 and has been a vocal advocate for the political rights and civic inclusion of Bengalis and other minority communities.
- Nabilah Islam Parkes: In 2022, Nabilah Islam achieved a historic victory in the Georgia State Senate. With a long background as a grassroots activist, she has emerged as a powerful and influential figure in Georgia politics.
- Saddam Azlan Salim: Representing Virginia in the State Senate, Saddam Azlan Salim is among the youngest legislators in the state's history and the first Bengali to hold such a position. He was elected to the Virginia Senate in the 2023 Virginia Senate election from the 37th district.
- MD Rahman: MD Masudur Rahman is an American politician who serves as a member of the Connecticut State Senate from the 4th district since 2023, representing the towns of Andover, Glastonbury, Manchester, and Bolton. He is a member of the Democratic Party and currently serves as Chair of the Planning and Development Committee of the Connecticut State Senate.
- Raj Mukherji: Raj Mukherji is an American politician who has represented the 32nd legislative district in the New Jersey Senate since 2024. Earlier, he served five terms in the New Jersey General Assembly from 2014 to 2024 and held leadership roles such as majority whip and deputy speaker. Before his legislative career, he was deputy mayor of Jersey City and was also involved in business, law, and public service.
- Shahana Hanif: Shahana Hanif has played a significant role in New York's political landscape as a member of the New York City Council. As the first Muslim woman and first South Asian American elected to the council, she represents Brooklyn's 39th District and has been a leading voice on immigrant rights, housing justice, and social equity.
- Nuran Nabi: Nuran Nabi is a Bangladeshi-American scientist, author, and Ekushey Padak–winning writer who has was a councilman from Plainsboro Township, New Jersey. He has been elected to the Plainsboro Township Council multiple times and was re-elected for a fifth term unopposed.

==== Diplomacy ====
===== M. Osman Siddique =====
At the federal level, M. Osman Siddique is the first Bengali-American to serve as the United States Ambassador to Fiji, as well as concurrently accredited ambassador to Nauru, Tonga, and Tuvalu from 1999 to 2001. He became the first American Muslim to be appointed as a United States ambassador. During his tenure, he was ambassador at the time of the 2000 Fijian coup d'état and was involved in diplomatic engagement surrounding the crisis.

==== In the military and defense ====
===== Shariful M. Khan =====
Shariful M. Khan is a brigadier general in the United States Air Force and the first Bangladeshi-American to attain this rank. During his career, he has held several leadership positions in U.S. space operations and strategic planning, including command of the 310th Space Wing from 2020 to 2023. Since July 2025, he has been serving as Director of Staff for the “Golden Dome for America” program at the Pentagon.

===== Abuhena Saifulislam =====
Abuhena Saifulislam is a Bangladeshi-American naval officer and imam who serves as a commander in the United States Navy Chaplain Corps. In 1999 he became the first Muslim chaplain assigned to serve with units of the United States Marine Corps, where he worked to provide religious services and promote understanding of religion within the U.S. military. In the Navy his rank is Commander and he is known as Chaplain Saif.

=== Science, technology, and engineering ===
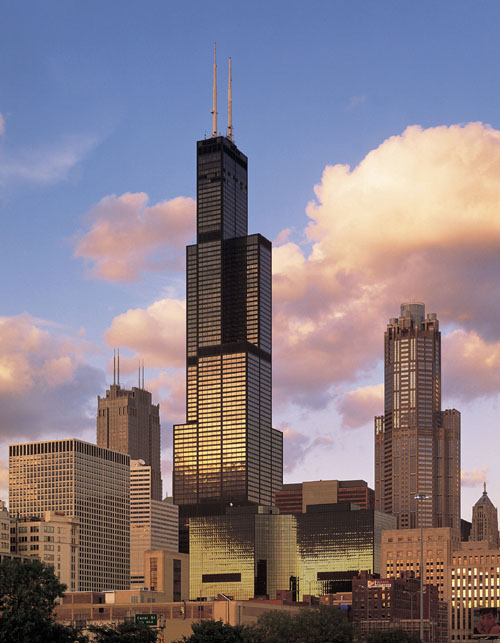
The Sears Tower (now Willis Tower) was designed by Fazlur Rahman Khan. It was the tallest building in the world for over two decades.

Individuals of Bengali origin have contributed to scientific and technological work in the United States across a range of fields. These contributions include areas such as structural and architectural engineering, as well as participation in research and technical programs associated with organizations such as NASA.

==== Engineering and architecture ====
===== Fazlur Rahman Khan =====
Fazlur Rahman Khan was a Bangladeshi American structural engineer known for his development of the tubular structural system, a method that significantly influenced high-rise building design in the twentieth century. He contributed to the structural engineering of major skyscrapers, including Chicago's Sears Tower (now known as the Willis Tower) and the John Hancock Center. The structural principles associated with the tubular system continue to be applied in the design and construction of tall buildings in various parts of the world. Khan worked in Chicago at Skidmore, Owings & Merrill (SOM), where he collaborated with architect Bruce Graham on several landmark skyscrapers, including the Sears Tower (1973) and the John Hancock Center (1969). Through innovations in bracing systems and the bundled tube design, he helped usher in a new era of supertall buildings. Because of his transformative impact on the field, he has often been described as the “Einstein of Structural Engineering.” Earlier in his career, he received a Fulbright Scholarship to pursue his studies in the United States, and he later became a U.S. citizen in 1967.

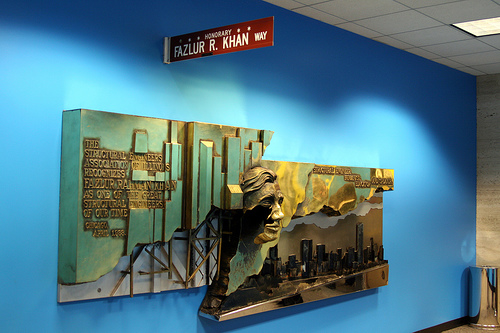
Fazlur Rahman Khan Memorial Sculpture at Sears Tower

==== NASA and space research ====
- Mahmooda Sultana is a Bangladeshi-origin research engineer at the NASA Goddard Space Flight Center, where she has worked since 2010. Her research focuses on nanomaterial-based detectors and sensor technologies for space applications. In 2019, she led a team that received a $2 million technology development award for a nanomaterial-based detector platform. Her work has been recognized through several NASA honors, including the Innovator of the Year award and the Robert H. Goddard Award for technology development.
- Amitabha Ghosh is an Indian planetary geologist and scientist who has worked on Mars-related research and missions associated with NASA. His work has included participation in site-selection studies for the Curiosity rover's landing in Gale Crater, as well as involvement in earlier missions such as Mars Pathfinder and the Mars Exploration Rover program. His contributions have been recognized through NASA achievement awards related to Mars exploration.
- Abdus Suttar Khan was a Bangladeshi scientist whose career focused on aerospace and materials research over several decades. He conducted research with organizations including NASA, United Technologies, and Alstom. Khan developed more than forty alloy compositions for commercial applications in aerospace and industrial systems, including space shuttles, jet engines, railway engines, and gas turbines. His work received formal recognition from institutions such as NASA, the United States Air Force, United Technologies, and Alstom. He was elected a Fellow of the Royal Society of Chemistry in 1996, became a Chartered Scientist (ProfScientist) of the same society in 2005, and was a member of the ASM International. A hydrocarbon fuel catalyst technology developed under a joint NASA–U.S. Air Force contract was designated an enabling technology by both agencies in 1992.
- Madhulika Guhathakurta, also known as Lika Guhathakurta, is an Indian American astrophysicist who has worked within NASA's Heliophysics Science Division. She was lead program scientist for NASA's Living With a Star initiative and has held program scientist roles for missions including the Solar Dynamics Observatory, the Van Allen Probes, and the Solar Terrestrial Relations Observatory (STEREO).
- Sharmila Bhattacharya is an Indian American scientist at the NASA Ames Research Center, where she serves as Chief Scientist for Astrobionics and leads the Biomodel Performance and Behavior Laboratory. She has worked on space bioscience experiments using biological model organisms and has received NASA honors, including the NASA Exceptional Scientific Achievement Medal (2018).
- Anita Sengupta is an American aerospace engineer. She earned her M.S. (2000) and Ph.D. (2005) in aerospace and mechanical engineering from the Viterbi School of Engineering at the University of Southern California. She was lead systems engineer for the parachute system used in the landing of Mars Science Laboratory's Curiosity rover. She later worked as project manager for the Cold Atom Laboratory at Jet Propulsion Laboratory (Caltech), was Senior Vice President of Systems Engineering at Virgin Hyperloop One, and is currently Chief Product Officer at Airspace Experience Technologies (ASX).

==== Other scientists and researchers ====
- M. Zahid Hasan: M. Zahid Hasan is the Eugene Higgins Professor of Physics at Princeton University. His research focuses on condensed matter physics, including work on quantum Hall phenomena. Hasan is an elected fellow of the American Academy of Arts and Sciences. In 2024, Hasan was appointed a visiting professor to the Massachusetts Institute of Technology.
- M. Taher Saif: Bangladeshi-American Mechanical engineer and academic researcher; Professor at the University of Illinois; elected to the United States National Academy of Engineering in 2024 for contributions to micro- and nanoscale engineering and cellular biomechanics. This recognition is often compared to winning the “Nobel Prize in Engineering.”
- Maqsudul Alam: Maqsudul Alam was a renowned geneticist whose work on the genomes of papaya, rubber, and jute earned global recognition. While working at the University of Hawaiʻi, his research opened new horizons in agricultural science and biotechnology.
- Latifur Khan: Latifur Khan is a computer scientist whose research focuses on data mining, stream analytics, and related areas of computer science. His work has been published in international academic venues and contributes to research in data-intensive systems and electronic information processing.
- Irene Solaiman: Irene Solaiman is a researcher whose work focuses on artificial intelligence policy, safety, and governance. She has held research and advisory roles with organizations including Massachusetts Institute of Technology. Her publications examine issues related to the societal impacts of AI systems and frameworks for their governance.
- Abul Hussam: Inventor of the Sono arsenic filter.
- Mohammad Ataul Karim: Electrical engineer and researcher.
- Rumman Chowdhury: Bangladeshi-origin American data scientist and CEO of Humane Intelligence; recognised in Time's 100 Most Influential People in AI (2023); selected by the U.S. Department of State as a U.S. Science Envoy for 2024.
- M. Saif Islam: He is a Fellow of AAAS, OSA, SPIE, and IEEE, and holds 42 US and international patents. He has authored over 250 scientific papers, and his team demonstrated the first 3D transistor array using silicon nanobridges.

=== Academia and economics ===
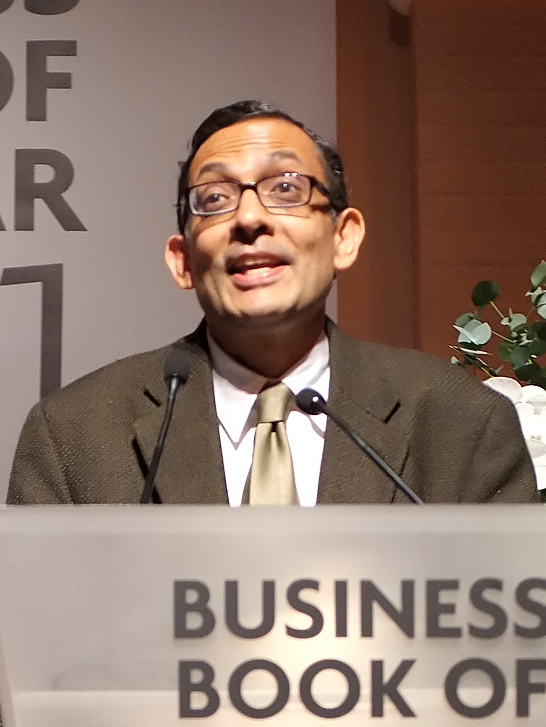
Nobel laureate Abhijit Banerjee

==== Abhijit Banerjee ====
Abhijit Banerjee is an economist and Nobel Prize laureate who serves as a professor at the Massachusetts Institute of Technology. His research focuses on development economics, including the study of poverty alleviation through the use of randomized controlled trials (RCTs), a methodological approach that has been widely applied in empirical economic research.

==== Others ====
- Kaushik Basu, a professor at Cornell University and a former Chief Economist of the World Bank.
- Ahmed Mushfiq Mobarak – Economist and professor of economics at Yale University; co-chair of initiatives at the Abdul Latif Jameel Poverty Action Lab (J-PAL) and lead academic for Bangladesh at the International Growth Centre.
- Pranab Bardhan, a professor at the University of California, Berkeley
- Ali Riaz – Distinguished Professor at Illinois State University, expert on South Asian politics.
- Narasingha Sil – Professor of History at Western Oregon University.
- Mir Masoom Ali – Distinguished Professor Emeritus of Statistics at Ball State University.
- Fazle Hussain – Professor of Mechanical Engineering at Texas Tech University.
- Kali S. Banerjee – Statistician and professor at the University of Delaware.
- Moni Lal Bhoumik – Physicist and author; co-developer of excimer laser technology.
- Raj Chandra Bose – Mathematician and statistician known for design theory.
- Ananda Mohan Chakrabarty – Microbiologist known for his work in directed evolution.
- Radha Laha – Mathematician and statistician.
- Sezan Mahmud – Medical scientist, educator, and physician.
- Samarendra Nath Roy – Mathematician and statistician.
- Asif Azam Siddiqi – Space historian and professor at Fordham University.
- K. Sabeel Rahman – American professor and author who is a professor of law at Cornell Law School.

=== In security and law enforcement forces ===
==== Didarul Islam ====
Didarul Islam was a Bangladeshi American police officer with the New York City Police Department (NYPD). He joined the department in 2021 and was assigned to the 47th Precinct in the Bronx. On 28 July 2025, Islam was fatally shot while responding to a gun attack at 345 Park Avenue in Midtown Manhattan, New York City. At the time of the incident, he was off duty but in uniform and had been assigned to provide security at the building. According to official accounts, he attempted to confront the attacker and was killed during the incident. Following his death, Islam was posthumously promoted to Detective First Grade by the NYPD.

=== Business, entrepreneurship, and technology ===
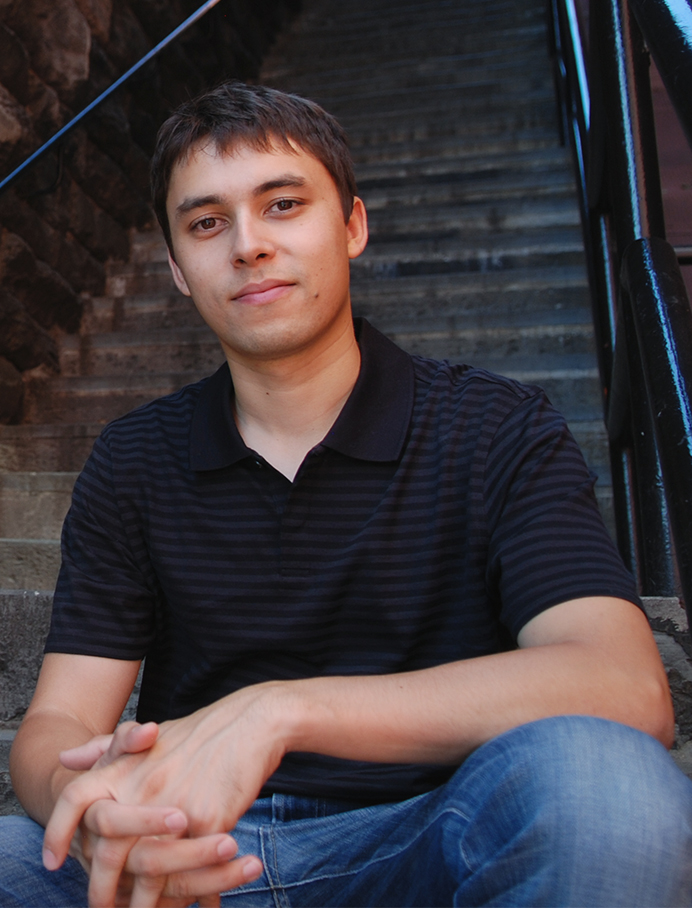
Jawed Karim, co-founder of YouTube

==== Jawed Karim ====
Jawed Karim is a co-founder of the video-sharing platform YouTube and is of Bangladeshi origin. He is also known for uploading the first video to the platform, titled Me at the zoo, in 2005. Karim's role in the early development of YouTube is documented as part of the platform's origins and its subsequent impact on online video distribution. From early childhood, he learned Bengali from his grandmother. In fact, he learned Bengali even before learning English.

==== Omar Ishrak ====
Omar Ishrak is a Bangladeshi American business executive who has held senior leadership roles in multinational technology and medical device companies. He was chief executive officer of Medtronic and later chairma of Intel. During his tenure at Medtronic, the company expanded its operations across multiple international markets. His subsequent appointment as board chair at Intel placed him in a senior governance role within the technology sector.

==== Sal Khan ====
Sal Khan is the founder of the nonprofit educational organization Khan Academy. The platform provides free online instructional resources across a wide range of subjects and has been used by learners in many countries. Khan's work is associated with the expansion of online education and digital learning tools in the early twenty-first century.

==== Others ====
- Kamal Quadir – Entrepreneur; founder of CellBazaar and bKash.
- Fahim Saleh – Entrepreneur and founder of Pathao and Gokada.
- Amar Bose – Founder and chairman of Bose Corporation.
- Iqbal Quadir – Founder of Grameenphone and academic at MIT.
- Purnendu Chatterjee – Industrialist and founder of The Chatterjee Group.
- Subir Chowdhury – Author and management consultant.
- Sumaya Kazi – Entrepreneur and founder of Sumazi.

=== Awards ===
==== Presidential Early Career Award for Scientists and Engineers ====
- Barna Saha, University of Massachusetts – Amherst (2017)
- Ehsan Hoque, University of Rochester (2018, 2025)

=== Culture, media, and arts ===
==== Literature ====
- Jhumpa Lahiri – Pulitzer Prize-winning author.
- Rumaan Alam – Novelist and editor.
- Dilruba Ahmed – Poet and historian.
- Dhan Gopal Mukerji – Writer and Newbery Medal winner.

==== Journalism and commentary ====
Reihan Salam is an American policy commentator who previously was an Associate Editor at The Atlantic. He is currently the President of the Manhattan Institute, a public policy research organization.

Rebecca Rashid is a media professional who has worked as a podcast host and television producer. Her work has received industry recognition, including an Emmy Award.

==== Film, music, and entertainment ====
In contemporary literature, Rumaan Alam is an American novelist whose works have received literary awards and critical attention. Dilruba Ahmed is a poet, and Sezan Mahmud is a physician and writer; both have produced literary work within the United States that engages with themes associated with Bengali and diasporic experiences.

In the visual arts, Naeem Mohaiemen and Hasan M. Elahi are artists whose work has been exhibited internationally. Their practices include photography, video, and installation, and address themes related to history, politics, identity, and surveillance.

==== Others ====
- Tasmin Mahfuz – Television journalist.
- Reihan Salam – Political commentator and editor.
- Arianna Afsar – Former Miss California and singer.
- Kamal Ahmed – Comedian and member of the Jerky Boys.
- Anik Khan – Rapper and musician.
- Marjana Chowdhury – Model and beauty queen.
- Hasan M. Elahi – Interdisciplinary media artist.
- Abdul "Duke" Fakir – Singer and founding member of the Four Tops.
- Rahsaan Islam – Actor and filmmaker.
- Norah Jones – Multi-Grammy winning singer and actress.
- Jai Wolf – Electronic music producer.
- Mindy Kaling – Actress, comedian, and writer.
- Firoz Mahmud – Visual artist and painter.
- Ellis Miah – Music producer and songwriter.
- Naeem Mohaiemen – Filmmaker and visual artist.
- Kausar Mohammed – Actress and writer.
- Fuad al Muqtadir – Musician and composer.
- Nabela Noor – Entrepreneur and social media personality.
- Shomi Patwary – Designer and music video director.
- Badal Roy – Tabla player and percussionist.
- Shikhee – Singer and lead of the band Android Lust.
- Palbasha Siddique – Vocalist and singer.
- Monica Yunus – Operatic soprano.
- Saif Ahmad – World Series of Poker winner.
- Syque Caesar – Artistic gymnast.
- Rahat Hossain – YouTube personality (MagicofRahat).
- Cavan Sullivan – Professional soccer player.
- Quinn Sullivan – Professional soccer player.

==== Culinary and lifestyle ====
- Leepu Nizamuddin Awlia – Automotive designer and engineer.
- Sohla El-Waylly – Chef and YouTube personality.
- Dipa Ma – Meditation teacher.

=== Social activism and community figures ===
- Rais Bhuiyan – Shooting survivor, activist, and IT professional.
- Anika Rahman – Human rights lawyer and non-profit leader.

=== Historical figures ===
==== Early political activists ====
===== Tarak Nath Das =====
Tarak Nath Das was an Indian revolutionary and political scholar who played a notable role in mobilizing Indian immigrants in North America in support of the Indian independence movement in the early twentieth century. After arriving in the United States in 1907, he organized immigrant communities and published the journal Free Hindustan, which advocated resistance against British colonial rule. He was also associated with revolutionary networks linked to Jatindra Nath Mukherjee (Bagha Jatin) and contributed to early efforts that later led to the formation of the Ghadar movement. Alongside his political activism, Das pursued higher education in the United States, earned a PhD in political science from the University of Washington, and later was a professor of political science at Columbia University.

==== Early immigrants ====
A.K. Mozumdar – an Indian American spiritual writer and teacher associated with the New Thought Movement in the United States.

== Violence and safety concerns ==
=== Florida student murders (2026) ===
In April 2026, two 27-year-old Bengali doctoral students, Zamil Ahamed Limon and Nahida Sultana Bristy, were murdered in Florida. The suspect, Limon's 26-year-old roommate Hisham Abugharbieh, was arrested and charged with two counts of first-degree murder with a weapon. This tragic event caused significant concern regarding the safety of students within the Bengali American community.

=== Brooklyn restaurant shooting ===
On the night of 22 August 2026 (around 11:30 pm local time), Md Youssuf Ali Raju (44), hailing from Sonaimuri in Noakhali, was shot dead by a gunman at a fast-food restaurant in Brooklyn, New York. He was shot in the chest while working in the kitchen, and another Bangladeshi employee was injured in the leg while rushing to help him.

== See also ==
- Bangladeshi Americans
- Pakistani Americans
- Indian Americans
- South Asian Americans
- Telugu Americans
- Punjabi Americans
- Tamil Americans
- Nepalese Americans
