= Demographics of Asian Americans =

Proportion of Asian Americans in each U.S. state, the District of Columbia, and Puerto Rico as of the 2020 United States census

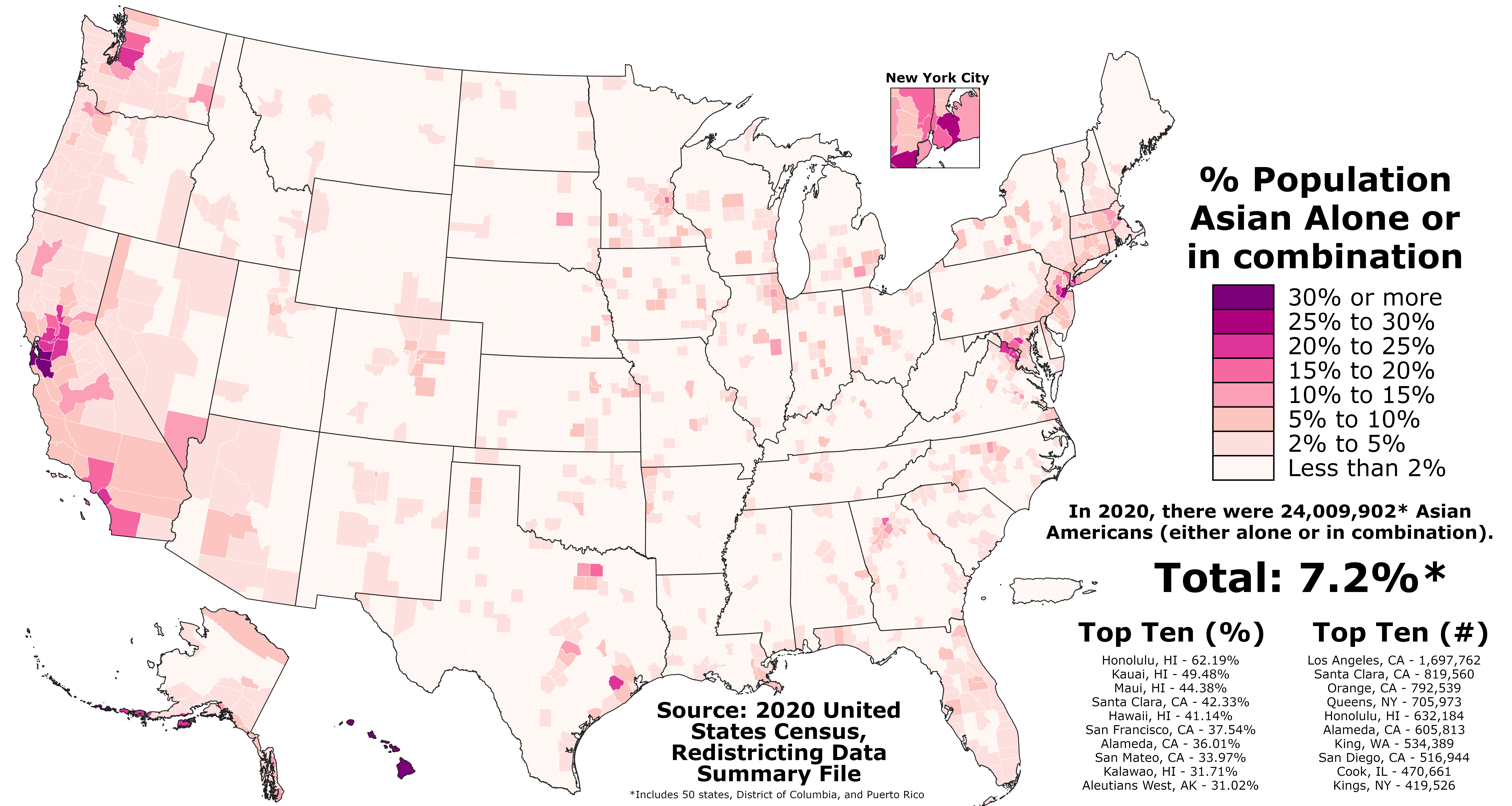
Proportion of Asian Americans in each county of the fifty states, the District of Columbia, and Puerto Rico as of the 2020 United States census

The demographics of Asian Americans describe a heterogeneous group of people in the United States who trace their ancestry to one or more Asian countries.

Manilamen began to reside in Louisiana as the first Asian Americans to live in the continental United States. Most Asian Americans have arrived after 1965. These individuals make up one-quarter of all immigrants who have arrived in the U.S. since 1965, and 59% of Asian Americans are foreign-born. During the 2010 United States census the largest ethnic groups were Chinese American, Filipino Americans, Indian Americans, Vietnamese Americans, Korean Americans, and Japanese Americans.

The 2020 United States census reported approximately 19.9 million people identified as Asian alone in 2020. Adding in the 4.1 million respondents who identified as Asian in combination with another race group, the Asian American population comprised 24 million people (7.2% of the total population).

The overall population is highly urbanized and is concentrated in the West Coast of the United States and New York metropolitan area. Generally, Asian Americans are well educated, and Asian American households have higher average incomes. However, socioeconomic status is not uniform among their population. Asian Americans hold diverse religious views, with substantial numbers being religiously unaffiliated or secular, Christian, Hindu, and Muslim. About 4-5% of Asian Americans identify as LGBT.

== Background ==
The first recorded Asian Americans in the continental United States were a group of Filipino men who established the small settlement of Saint Malo, Louisiana, after fleeing mistreatment aboard Spanish ships. Since there were no women with them, the Manilamen, as they were known, married Cajun and Native American women. In 1778, Chinese and European explorers first arrived in Hawaii. Numerous Chinese and Japanese began immigrating to the US in the mid-19th century; numerous Chinese immigrants worked as laborers on the First transcontinental railroad, many who immigrated due to overpopulation and poverty experienced in Guangdong (Canton). In the mid-20th century, refugees from Southeast Asia fled wars in the homelands to come to the United States. Most Asian Americans who immigrated to the United States arrived after 1965, due to immigration reform that ended an earlier era of exclusion of Asian immigrants.

== Population ==
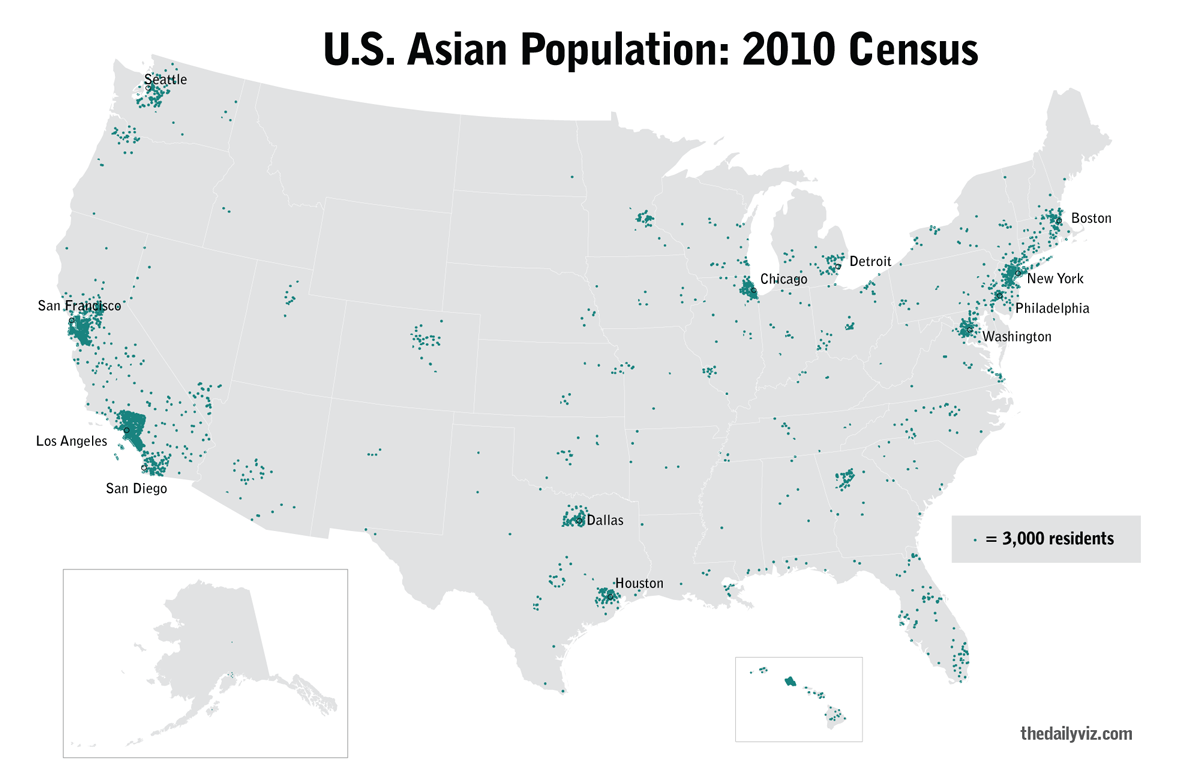
Asian population density

Historical population
Year	Pop.	±%
1860	34,933	—
1870	63,254	+81.1%
1880	105,613	+67.0%
1890	109,527	+3.7%
1900	114,189	+4.3%
1910	146,863	+28.6%
1920	182,137	+24.0%
1930	264,766	+45.4%
1940	254,918	−3.7%
1950	321,033	+25.9%
1960	980,337	+205.4%
1970	1,538,721	+57.0%
1980	3,500,439	+127.5%
1990	6,908,638	+97.4%
2000	11,896,828	+72.2%
2010	17,320,856	+45.6%
2020	24,000,998	+38.6%
Sources: Beginning in 2000 and continuing through the latest census, figures now include Multiracial Asian American Americans 1910, 1920, 1930, 1960, 1970, and 1980 include Pacific Islands American population numbers

According to the United States Census Bureau, the Asian American population, including those of multiracial and Hispanic and Latino ancestry, per its 2017 American Community Survey was about 22,408,464.

During the 2010 United States census, there were a total of 17,320,856 Asian Americans, including Multiracial Americans identifying as part Asian. This made Asian Americans 5.6 percent of the total American population. The largest ethnic groups represented in the census were Chinese (3.79 million), Filipino (3.41 million), Indian (3.18 million), Vietnamese (1.73 million), Korean (1.7 million), and Japanese (1.3 million). Other sizable ethnic groups include Pakistani (409,000), Cambodian (276,000), Hmong (260,000), Thai (237,000), Laotian (232,000), Bangladeshi (147,000), and Burmese (100,000). The total population of Asian Americans grew by 46 percent from 2000 to 2010 according to the Census Bureau, which constituted the largest increase of any major racial group during that period. In 2010, there were an estimated 11,284,000 foreign born individuals who were born in Asia, of whom 57.7% had become naturalized citizens. Additionally, 209,128 were Hispanic and Latino, of whom the largest population (101,654) claim Mexico as their nation of origin.

According to the 2022 American Community Survey, Bangladeshi Americans are among the fastest-growing Asian American groups in the United States.

The 2000 census recorded 11.9 million people (4.2 percent of the total population) who reported themselves as having either full or partial Asian heritage. The largest ethnic subgroups were Chinese (2.7 million), Filipino (2.4 million), Indian (1.9 million), Vietnamese (1.2 million), Korean (1.2 million), and Japanese (1.1 million). Other sizable groups included Cambodians (206,000), Pakistanis (204,000), Lao (198,000), Hmong (186,000), and Thais (150,000). About one-half of the Asian American population lived in the West, with California having the most total Asian Americans of any state, at 4.2 million. As a proportion of the total population, Hawaii is the only state with an Asian American majority population, at 58 percent; (Note: In terms of Asians alone (not mixed with any other race), Hawaii's population was 37.6% Asian in 2019 (a plurality of the population).) Honolulu County had the highest percentage of Asian Americans of any county in the nation, with 62 percent. In 2000, 69 percent of all Asian Americans were foreign born, except Japanese Americans, 60 percent of whom were born in the United States.

The Twenty-first United States census, conducted in 1990, recorded 6.9 million people who were called American Asians. The largest ethnic groups were Chinese (23.8 percent), Filipino (20.4 percent), Japanese (12.3 percent), Indian (11.8 percent), Korean (11.6 percent), Vietnamese (8.9 percent), and Laotian (2.2 percent). Smaller populations, of less than two percent, were documented of the following ethnicities: Cambodian, Thai, Hmong, Pakistani, Indonesian, Malay, Bangladeshi, Sri Lankan, and Burmese. Two thirds of "American-Asians" lived in the five states of California, New York, Hawaii, Texas, and Illinois. Additionally their highest population concentrations were in California, New York, and Hawaii. In 1990, 66 percent of American Asians were foreign-born, with Vietnamese, Laotians, and Cambodians having this highest foreign born populations.

== Distribution ==
The Asian American population is greatly urbanized, with nearly three-quarters of them living in metropolitan areas with population greater than 2.5 million. The three metropolitan areas with the highest Asian American populations are the Greater Los Angeles Area (1.868 million in 2007), the New York metropolitan area (1.782 million in 2007), and the San Francisco Bay Area (1,577,790 in 2007). New York City proper, according to the United States 2010 Census, is home to more than one million Asian Americans, greater than the combined totals of San Francisco and Los Angeles. This trend of a largely urban population continues to be observed in 2015, with significant populations in more expensive coastal cities, and less than five percent living in rural areas. Among the ten largest US cities, San Diego has the greatest proportion of Asian Americans. As of 2017, West (45%) and California (31%) had the most significant concentrations of the total Asian American populations; this keeps with historic trends of Asian Americans primarily residing in the Western United States, although there is a shift towards other regions of the United States beginning in the late 20th century.

According to the 2010 Census almost three quarters of all Asian Americans live in California, New York, Texas, New Jersey, Hawaii, Illinois, Washington, Florida, Virginia, and Pennsylvania. A large proportion of all Asian Americans live in California (5.6 million in 2010), New York (1.6 million in 2010), and Texas (1.1 million in 2010). Another state with a significant Asian American population is Massachusetts. Hawaii had the largest proportion of Asian Americans, with 57% of the state population identifying as Asian or multiracial with at least one part Asian. In Vermont in 2008, Asian Americans were the largest minority. Also, two U.S. territories (Guam and the Northern Mariana Islands) have large Asian populations — in 2010, Guam's population was 32.2% Asian, and the population of the Northern Mariana Islands was 49.9% Asian.

Asian American populations have grown significantly since the 1970s. However, they are underrepresented in several large urban areas, such as Chicago, Philadelphia, Dallas, and Atlanta, although in some cases, Asian Americans are concentrated in specific urban neighborhoods or suburbs of these cities.

In regions with large numbers of Asian Americans, communities have developed that are heavily or predominantly Asian. Schools in these areas may offer instruction in languages such as Mandarin. These communities are often given unofficial names to reflect their populations, such as Chinatown, Little Manila, Little India, Japantown, Little Pakistan, Koreatown, Little Saigon, and Little Cambodia.

Metropolitan areas with the highest population of Asian Americans (greater than 250,000 people)(2010 Census)
Metropolitan area	Total	% of total population
Los Angeles-Long Beach-Santa Ana, CA Metro Area	1,884,669	14.7%
New York-Northern New Jersey-Long Island, NY-NJ-PA Metro Area	1,878,261	9.9%
San Francisco-Oakland-Fremont, CA Metro Area	1,005,823	23.2%
San Jose-Sunnyvale-Santa Clara, CA Metro Area	571,967	31.1%
Chicago-Joliet-Naperville, IL-IN-WI Metro Area	532,801	5.6%
Washington-Arlington-Alexandria, DC-VA-MD-WV Metro Area	517,458	9.3%
Honolulu, HI Metro Area	477,503	43.9%
Seattle-Tacoma-Bellevue, WA Metro Area	392,961	11.4%
Houston-Sugar Land-Baytown, TX Metro Area	389,007	6.5%
Dallas-Fort Worth-Arlington, TX Metro Area	341,503	5.4%
San Diego-Carlsbad-San Marcos, CA Metro Area	336,091	10.9%
Philadelphia-Camden-Wilmington, PA-NJ-DE-MD Metro Area	295,766	5.0%
Boston-Cambridge-Quincy, MA-NH Metro Area	294,503	6.5%
Riverside-San Bernardino-Ontario, CA Metro Area	259,071	6.1%
Sacramento--Arden-Arcade--Roseville, CA Metro Area	255,995	11.9%
Atlanta-Sandy Springs-Marietta, GA Metro Area	254,307	4.8%

Metropolitan Areas with the Highest Proportion of Asian Americans (2010 Census)
Metropolitan Area	Total population	% of Asian Americans
Honolulu, HI MSA	953,207	43.9
San Francisco Bay Area	8,153,696	23.3
Greater Los Angeles Area	17,877,006	14.7
Sacramento/Yolo, CA CMSA	2,414,783	11.9%
Seattle-Tacoma metropolitan area	4,274,767	11.4%
San Diego, CA MSA	3,095,313	10.9%
New York metropolitan area	23,076,664	9.9%
Baltimore-Washington (AA demographics)	7,608,070	9.3%
Greater Houston	5,920,416	6.5

== Trends ==
Asian Americans, on average, have higher incomes and education levels than White Americans. However, they also have higher poverty rates and lower home ownership rates. In addition, homeownership among Asian Americans has increased by twice as much as white Americans in recent years (see Homeownership in the United States).

=== Education ===
Asian Americans have the highest educational attainment of any racial group in the country; about 49.8% of them have at least a bachelor's degree. Since the 1990s, Asian American students often have the highest math averages in standardized tests such as the SAT and GRE. Their combined scores are usually higher than those of white Americans. The proportion of Asian Americans at many selective educational institutions exceeds the national population rate. Asians constitute around 10–20 percent of those attending Ivy League and other elite universities. Asian Americans are a plurality on six of the nine University of California undergraduate campuses, are the largest racial group of undergraduates in the system, and make up more than a quarter of graduate and professional students. Asian Americans are more likely to attend college, are more likely to apply to competitive colleges, and have significantly higher college completion level than other races. According to a poll targeting Asian Americans in 14 states and the District of Columbia conducted by the Asian American Legal Defense and Education Fund in 2013, 40 percent of Asian Americans have a college degree, with almost a quarter of them having achieved an education attainment greater than a bachelor's degree. That same year, Asian Americans in their late thirties had the highest percentage (65%) of college graduates for that age group than any other race or ethnicity in the United States. These high education attainment statistics contribute to a stereotype of academic and vocational excellence for Asian Americans.

However, there are concerns that the goal of diversity in American higher education has had a negative effect on Asians, with charges of quotas and discrimination starting in the 1980s. Asian American test scores are also bimodal—Asians are over represented both at high scores and low scores. A stereotype has been created that Asian Americans only study STEM and health-related fields at their universities (to become engineers, doctors, etc.). But according to a report by the College Board, Asian Americans do have academic interest in fields like social science, humanities, and education. According to an opinion piece written in The Harvard Crimson, Asian Americans are "over-represented" in higher education in the United States, specifically at elite colleges. These include Harvard University and Massachusetts Institute of Technology, where over a fifth of undergraduates are Asian American. Similar increases in Asian American enrollment was found in the University of California system, especially in the late 20th century. However, only a small number of institutions are presented, usually selective enrollment institutions, thus making it appear that Asian Americans make up a large part of a university's student population. Moreover, this discrimination brought upon Asian Americans in education has encouraged the model minority stereotype in American society. The high expectations placed on Asian American students often cause the problems faced by these students to be overlooked. Issues related to social pressure and mental health are often overlooked due to the idea of the model minority. Education is one of the main aspects that are given a high regard in the social expectations of Asian Americans.

=== Income ===
It should be understood that different Asian American groups have different levels of household income, per capita income and personal wages.

It should be noted as written by the NRCC Asian American income is better understood when household size and cost of living is factored as many Asian American groups have larger households and disproportionally live in metropolitan areas where the cost of living is high.

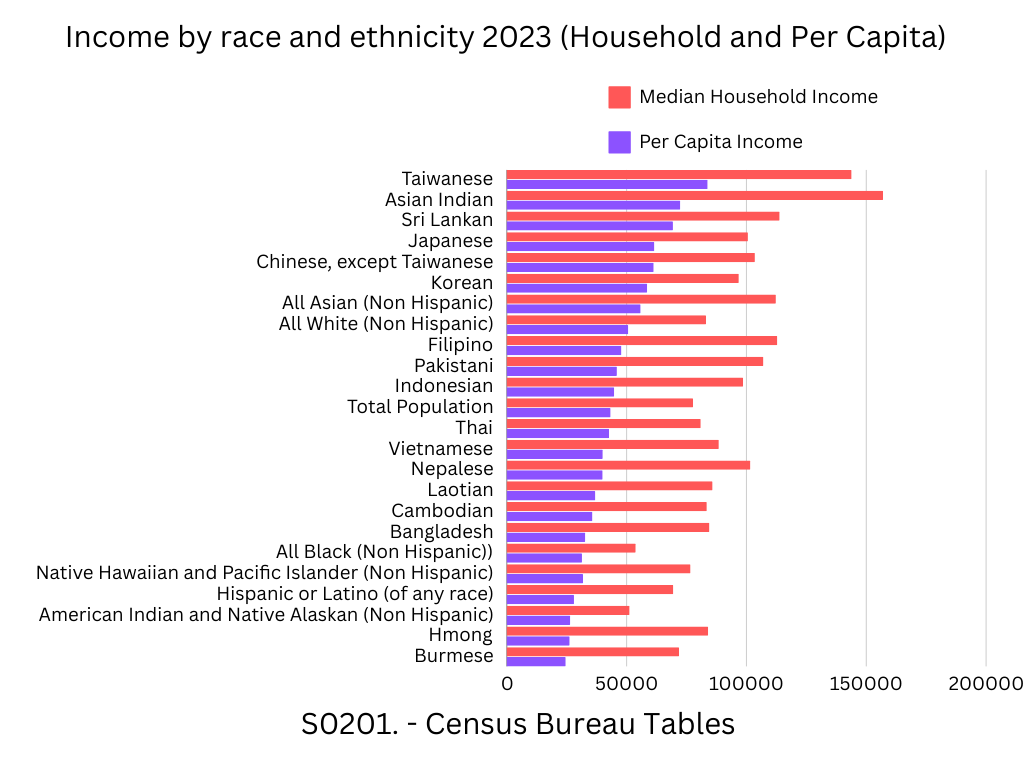
Income by race and ethnicity and Asian American group 2023 (Household and Per Capita)

While Asian Americans have higher household and personal income levels than any other racial demographic, the Asian poverty rate is higher than that of European Americans. In 2005, the median per capita income for Asian Americans was estimated at $27,331, compared to $26,496 for Whites, $16,874 for African Americans, and $14,483 for those identifying as Hispanic or Latino; the median household income of Asian Americans was estimated at $61,094, compared to $48,554 for European Americans. Additionally 28 percent of Asian American households had incomes exceeding $100,000, compared to 18 percent of the overall population. In 2006, Asian American households were slightly larger than other households, with fewer households with no earners.

In 2008, Asian American households had the highest median income in the US, at $65,637; however, 11.8 percent of Asians were in poverty in 2004, higher than the 8.6 percent rate for non-Hispanic whites. This is largely due to the fact that a high percentage of Asian Americans are immigrants, and independently of race, immigrants are more likely than the native-born to be poor. Once country of birth and other demographic factors are taken into account, Asian Americans are no more likely than non-Hispanic whites to live in poverty. Much of this poverty is concentrated in ethnic enclaves, such as Chinatowns.

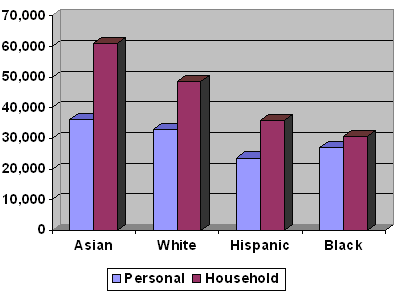
Median household and personal income along racial lines.

Household income distribution, by race/ethnicity, 2009Source: United States Census Bureau
Race/ethnic group	Type of income	<$15k	$15k- $25k	$25k- $35k	$35k- $50k	$50k- $75k	$75k- $100k	>$100k
All Americans	Households	13.0%	11.9%	11.1%	14.1%	18.1%	11.5%	20.1%
European Americans	Households	11.4%	11.6%	10.8%	14.2%	18.7%	12.0%	21.4%
African Americans	Households	23.5%	15.4%	13.4%	14.5%	15.1%	8.7%	9.3%
Asian & Pacific Islanders	Households	11.7%	7.9%	8.2%	11.1%	16.9%	11.8%	32.4%
Hispanic or Latino	Households	16.5%	15.2%	14.3%	15.4%	17.6%	9.1%	11.7%

In 2010, the median household income of Asian Americans had increased to $67,022. As with educational achievement, economic prosperity is not uniform among all Asian American groups. In 2005 Census figures show that an average white male with a college diploma earns around $66,000 a year, while similarly educated Asian men earn around $52,000 a year.

However, by 2008, according to the College Board and United States Census Bureau, Asian American males with similar education achievement as their White American male counterparts earned more than their White American male counterparts (median AM = $71K, median WM = $66K). Asian American females also earned more than their White American female counterparts (median AF = $67K, median WF = $51K).

As of 2015, that trend continued.

=== Population growth ===
Asian American population growth is fueled largely by immigration. Natural population growth accounts for a small proportion of the 43 percent increase in total Asian American population between 2000 and 2010.

==== Asian American 2022 Population Estimates ====
Ancestry	Population estimate
Bangladeshi	213,372
Burmese	189,250
Cambodian	300,360
Chinese	5,205,461
Indian	4,506,308
Filipino	4,089,570
Hmong	320,164
Indonesian	126,935
Japanese	782,772
Korean	1,468,279
Laotian	262,229
Nepalese	175,005
Pakistani	526,956
Sri Lankan	52,448
Taiwanese	213,774
Thai	329,343
Vietnamese	2,162,610
Other Asian, specified	7,815
Other Asian, not specified	673,674
Total	22,408,464

==== Ancestry By Country Region ====
Ancestry	Population 2022
South Asians	6,268,769
East Asians	6,258,943
Southeast Asians	7,780,461

==== Asian American alone ====
Ancestry	Population 2000	Population 2010	Population 2023	Percent Change 2000-2010
Bangladeshi	46,905	142,080	289,423	202.9%
Bhutanese	192	18,814	15,037	9,699.0%
Burmese	14,620	95,536	220,379	553.5%
Cambodian	183,769	255,497	257,203	39.0%
Chinese	2,564,190	3,535,382	4,228,441	37.9%
Filipino	1,908,125	2,649,973	3,103,814	38.9%
Hispanic	119,829	–	–	–
Hmong	174,712	252,323	337,925	44.4%
Indian	1,718,778	2,918,807	4,713,643	69.8%
Indonesian	44,186	63,383	76,478	69.7%
Japanese	852,237	841,824	725,773	−1.2%
Korean	1,099,422	1,463,474	1,466,761	33.1%
Laotian	179,103	209,646	176,801	17.1%
Malaysian	15,029	21,868	26,002	45.5%
Maldivian	29	102	–	251.7%
Mongolian	3,699	15,138	39,237	309.2%
Nepalese	8,209	57,209	208,748	596.9%
Pakistani	164,628	382,994	607,713	132.6%
Ryukyuan	6,138	5,681	–	−7.4%
Singaporean	2,017	4,569	7,733	126.5%
Sri Lankan	21,364	41,456	68,525	94.0%
Taiwanese	118,827	199,387	262,269	67.6%
Thai	120,918	182,872	202,982	51.2%
Vietnamese	1,169,672	1,632,717	1,908,676	39.6%
Other Asian, not specified	162,913	238,332	235,482	46.3%
Total	10,242,998	14,674,252	20,052,323	43.3%

==== With multiracial identifiers ====
Ancestry	Population 2000	Population 2010	Population 2023	Percent Change 2000–2010
Bangladeshi	57,412	147,300	304,245	156.6%
Bhutanese	212	19,439	20,462	9,069.3%
Burmese	16,720	100,200	240,805	499.3%
Cambodian	206,052	276,667	361,760	34.3%
Chinese	2,865,232	4,010,114	5,457,033	40.0%
Filipino	2,364,815	3,416,840	4,640,313	44.5%
Hispanic	–	598,146	–	–
Hmong	186,310	260,073	363,565	39.6%
Indian	1,899,599	3,183,063	5,160,203	67.6%
Indonesian	63,073	95,270	147,014	51.0%
Japanese	1,148,932	1,304,286	1,646,953	13.5%
Korean	1,228,427	1,706,822	2,023,517	38.9%
Laotian	198,203	232,130	245,045	17.1%
Malaysian	18,566	26,179	48,179	41.0%
Maldivian	51	127	–	149.0%
Mongolian	5,868	18,344	51,954	212.6%
Nepalese	9,399	59,490	223,930	532.9%
Pakistani	204,309	409,163	684,438	100.3%
Ryukyuan	10,599	11,326	–	6.9%
Singaporean	2,394	5,347	12,435	123.4%
Sri Lankan	24,587	45,381	84,526	84.6%
Taiwanese	132,038	215,582	331,224	65.2%
Thai	150,283	237,583	343,265	58.1%
Vietnamese	1,223,736	1,737,433	2,347,344	42.0%
Other Asian, not specified	376,723	623,761	623,703	65.6%
Total	11,898,828	17,320,856	25,887,478	45.6%

== Language ==
According to the 2000 Census, the more prominent languages of the Asian American community include the Chinese languages (Mandarin, Cantonese, Taishanese, and Hokkien), Tagalog, Vietnamese, Korean, Japanese, Hindi, Tamil, Telugu, and Gujarati. In 2008, Chinese, Japanese, Korean, Tagalog, and Vietnamese languages were all used in elections in Alaska, California, Hawaii, Illinois, New York, Texas, and Washington state.

In 2010, there were 2.8 million people (5 and older) who spoke a Chinese language at home; after the English and Spanish languages, it is the third most common language in the United States. Other sizeable Asian languages are Tagalog, Vietnamese, Hindi/Urdu, and Korean, with all four having more than 1 million speakers in the United States.

In 2012, Alaska, California, Hawaii, Illinois, Massachusetts, Michigan, Nevada, New Jersey, New York, Texas and Washington were publishing election material in Asian languages in accordance with the Voting Rights Act. These include Tagalog, Mandarin Chinese, Vietnamese, Hindi and Bengali. Election materials were also available in Gujarati, Japanese, Khmer, Korean, and Thai. According to a 2013 poll conducted by the Asian American Legal Defense and Education Fund, 48 percent of Asian Americans considered media in their native language as their primary news source.

Language	Population 2016	Speak English "very well"	Speak English less than "very well"
Chinese	3,372,930	1,518,619	1,854,311
Tagalog	1,701,960	1,159,211	542,749
Vietnamese	1,509,994	634,273	875,720
Hindustani	1,285,358	985,291	304,227
Korean	1,088,788	505,734	583,054
Japanese	464,535	265,552	197,983
Gujarati	407,520	265,219	139,612
Telugu	365,566	264,368	143,152
Bengali	324,008	182,447	141,561
Tai-Kadai	307,442	152,210	155,212
Punjabi	287,491	168,743	118,748
Tamil	273,332	221,997	51,355
Hmong	224,133	133,163	90,970
Khmer	203,115	102,364	100,751
Other Austronesian languages	467,718	291,405	176,313
Other Indic languages	409,631	244,847	164,784
Other Dravidian languages	241,678	184,233	57,445
Other languages of Asia	384,154	175,146	209,008

== Religion ==
Asian American religious preferences are wide-ranging and tend to be more diverse than those other races in the United States. The growth of Asian American immigration since 1965 has contributed to this diversity. Until recently, a dearth of scholarship regarding Asian American religious beliefs led to a stereotype that Asian Americans are not religious or spiritual. Although 59 percent of Asian Americans believe strongly in the existence of one or more gods, 30 percent identify as "secular" or "somewhat secular." Only 39 percent of Asian American households belong to a local church or temple, due to atheism or adherence to Eastern religions without congregational traditions.

No religious affiliation claims a majority of Asian Americans. The Trinity College American Religious Identification Survey (ARIS) in 2008 found that of Asian Americans, 27% identified as none or agnostic, 21% identified with an Eastern religion, 17% identified as Catholic, 10% identified as generically Christian, 6% identified as mainline Protestant, 3% identified as Baptist, 2% identified as Penecostal or other Protestant, and 8% identified as Muslim. A separate 2008 survey of the Pew Forum on Religion & Public Life found that 17% of Asians identify as Catholic, 17% as evangelical Protestant, 14% as Hindu, 11% as secular, 3% as atheist, 4% as agnostic, and 5% as other unaffiliated. In 2012, a Pew Research Center survey of the Faiths of Asian Americans found that a plurality of Asian American respondents (42%) were Christian, followed by those who were unaffiliated (26%), Buddhist (14%), Hindu (10%), and Muslim (4%). The 2008 Pew survey found that about a third of American Buddhists are Asian.

Both the 2008 ARIS survey and the 2008 Pew survey found that of all major U.S. demographics, Asian Americans had the highest number of respondents who did not claim a religion or refused to divulge their religious affiliation. A Gallup poll conducted in 2010 found that Asian Americans were the group least likely to say that religion was important in their daily lives, although a 54 percent majority of respondents still said that religion was important in their daily lives.

Filipino Americans are majority Catholic, and a significant minority of Vietnamese Americans are as well. Most Muslim Asian Americans come from, or trace their ancestry to, Bangladesh, China, India, Indonesia, Malaysia, and Pakistan.

== Sexuality ==
According to a Gallup survey conducted from June to September 2012, 4.3 percent of Asian Americans self identify as LGBT. This compares with 4.6 percent of African-Americans, 4 percent of Hispanic-Americans, 3.2 percent of Caucasian-Americans, and the overall 3.4 percent of American adults that self identify as LGBT in the total population.

In a Gallup survey conducted in 2017, 4.9 percent of Asian Americans identified as LGBT, representing the second-highest growth of LGBT representation among African Americans, Hispanic Americans, and Caucasian Americans.

== U.S. states and territories ==
State/Territory	Asian American Population (2010)	Percentage Asian American (2010)	Asian American Population (2020)	Percentage Asian American (2020)
Alabama	67,036	1.4	102,777	2.0
Alaska	50,402	7.1	61,460	8.4
American Samoa	1,994	3.6	3,899	-
Arizona	230,907	3.6	351,132	4.9
Arkansas	44,943	1.5	68,568	2.6
California	5,556,592	14.9	7,045,163	17.8
Colorado	185,589	3.7	285,784	4.9
Connecticut	157,088	4.4	205,693	5.7
Delaware	33,701	3.8	50,969	5.1
District of Columbia	26,857	4.5	45,465	6.6
Florida	573,083	3.0	843,005	3.9
(Georgia (U.S. state)) Georgia	365,497	3.8	565,644	5.3
Guam	51,381	32.2	66,194	-
Hawaii	780,968	57.4	824,143	56.6
Idaho	29,698	1.9	47,513	2.6
Illinois	668,694	5.2	875,488	6.8
Indiana	126,750	2.0	212,649	3.1
Iowa	64,512	2.1	96,861	3.0
Kansas	83,930	2.9	112,195	3.8
Kentucky	62,029	1.4	98,763	2.2
Louisiana	84,335	1.9	111,836	2.4
Maine	18,333	1.4	25,473	1.9
Maryland	370,044	6.4	502,173	8.1
Massachusetts	394,211	6.0	582,484	8.3
Michigan	289,607	2.9	411,928	4.1
Minnesota	247,132	4.7	357,704	6.3
Mississippi	32,560	1.1	44,931	1.5
Missouri	123,571	2.1	179,336	2.9
Montana	10,482	1.1	16,889	1.6
Nebraska	40,561	2.2	69,006	3.5
Nevada	242,916	9.0	353,593	11.4
New Hampshire	34,522	2.6	46,861	3.4
New Jersey	795,163	9.0	1,046,732	11.3
New Mexico	40,456	2.0	55,997	2.6
New York	1,579,494	8.2	2,173,719	10.8
North Carolina	252,585	2.6	425,449	4.1
North Dakota	9,193	1.4	18,675	2.4
Northern Mariana Islands	26,908	49.9	25,011	-
Ohio	238,292	2.1	377,303	3.2
Oklahoma	84,170	2.2	123,614	3.1
Oregon	186,281	4.9	275,296	6.5
Pennsylvania	402,587	3.2	603,726	4.6
Puerto Rico	10,464	0.3	8,904	0.3
Rhode Island	36,763	3.5	48,450	4.4
South Carolina	75,674	1.6	123,666	2.4
South Dakota	10,216	1.3	18,489	2.1
Tennessee	113,398	1.8	178,683	2.6
Texas	1,110,666	4.4	1,849,226	6.3
Utah	77,748	2.8	125,088	3.8
Vermont	10,463	1.7	16,182	2.5
(United States Virgin Islands) Virgin Islands (U.S.)	1,457	1.4		-
Virginia	522,199	6.5	757,282	8.8
Washington	604,251	9.0	939,846	12.2
West Virginia	16,465	0.9	22,281	1.2
Wisconsin	151,513	2.7	216,345	3.7
Wyoming	6,729	1.2	9,473	1.6
United States of America	17,320,856	5.6	24,000,998	7.2

The above list displays the population of Asian Americans ("Alone, or in combination") in US states, Puerto Rico, and the District of Columbia, according to the 2010 United States census

== Origins of the Asian population (2010 Census) ==
State/Territory	Chinese	Filipino	Indian	Japanese	Korean	Vietnamese	Other Asian
Alabama	11,154	8,224	14,951	4,336	10,624	8,488	9,259
Alaska	3,726	25,424	1,911	3,926	6,542	1,446	7,427
American Samoa	440	1,217	3	11	217	34	72
Arizona	42,331	53,067	40,510	19,611	21,125	27,872	26,391
Arkansas	6,301	6,396	7,973	2,384	3,247	6,302	12,340
California	1,451,537	1,474,707	590,445	428,014	505,225	647,589	459,075
Colorado	33,344	26,242	24,135	22,714	28,177	23,933	27,044
Connecticut	36,483	16,402	50,806	6,203	11,760	10,804	24,630
Delaware	7,033	4,637	12,344	1,196	3,099	1,688	3,704
District of Columbia	6,583	3,670	6,417	2,010	2,990	1,856	3,331
Florida	94,244	122,691	151,438	25,747	35,629	65,772	77,562
(Georgia (U.S. state)) Georgia	54,298	28,528	105,444	14,247	60,836	49,264	52,880
Guam	2,617	41,944	—	2,368	3,437	337	678
Hawaii	199,751	342,095	4,737	312,292	48,699	13,266	139,872
Idaho	5,473	6,211	2,786	5,698	2,806	2,154	4,570
Illinois	119,308	139,090	203,669	28,623	70,263	29,101	78,640
Indiana	26,038	16,988	30,947	8,437	13,685	8,175	22,480
Iowa	11,494	6,026	12,525	2,854	7,375	9,543	14,695
Kansas	13,448	9,399	15,644	4,178	7,756	16,074	17,431
Kentucky	10,512	8,402	14,253	6,197	7,264	5,813	9,588
Louisiana	11,953	10,243	13,147	3,117	4,752	30,202	10,921
Maine	4,390	2,918	2,397	1,181	1,741	2,170	3,536
Maryland	79,660	56,909	88,709	12,826	55,051	26,605	50,284
Massachusetts	136,866	18,673	85,441	15,358	28,904	47,636	61,343
Michigan	51,525	32,324	84,750	17,412	30,292	19,456	53,848
Minnesota	30,047	15,660	38,097	7,995	20,995	27,086	107,252
Mississippi	5,333	5,638	6,458	807	2,301	7,721	4,302
Missouri	26,001	17,706	26,263	7,084	12,689	16,530	17,298
Montana	1,919	2,829	930	1,854	1,369	481	1,100
Nebraska	5,730	4,900	6,708	3,106	3,815	8,677	7,625
Nevada	39,448	123,891	14,290	21,364	18,518	12,366	13,039
New Hampshire	7,652	3,369	9,075	1,842	3,021	2,907	6,686
New Jersey	149,356	126,793	311,310	19,710	100,334	23,535	64,125
New Mexico	7,668	8,535	5,727	4,889	3,760	5,403	4,474
New York	615,932	126,129	368,767	51,781	153,609	34,510	228,763
North Carolina	40,820	29,314	63,852	12,878	25,420	30,665	49,636
North Dakota	1,762	1,704	1,740	628	933	791	1,635
Northern Mariana Islands	3,659	19,017	—	795	2,253	—	1,184
Ohio	50,870	27,661	71,211	16,995	21,207	15,639	34,706
Oklahoma	11,658	10,850	14,078	5,580	9,072	18,098	14,834
Oregon	41,374	29,101	20,200	24,535	20,395	29,485	21,191
Pennsylvania	96,606	33,021	113,389	12,699	47,429	44,605	54,838
Puerto Rico	2,751	445	5,475	313	205	232	1,043
Rhode Island	8,228	4,117	5,645	1,455	2,658	1,615	13,045
South Carolina	11,706	15,228	17,961	4,745	7,162	7,840	11,032
South Dakota	1,570	1,864	1,433	696	1,179	1,002	2,472
Tennessee	18,313	14,409	26,619	6,955	13,245	11,351	22,506
Texas	182,477	137,713	269,327	37,715	85,332	227,968	170,134
Utah	16,358	10,657	7,598	12,782	7,888	9,338	13,127
Vermont	2,833	1,035	1,723	842	1,271	1,206	1,553
(United States Virgin Islands) Virgin Islands (U.S.)	—	—	—	—	—	—	1,457
Virginia	72,585	90,493	114,471	20,138	82,006	59,984	82,522
Washington	120,814	137,083	68,978	67,597	80,049	75,843	53,887
West Virginia	3,208	3,059	3,969	1,159	1,571	1,104	2,395
Wisconsin	21,054	13,158	25,998	5,967	10,949	6,191	68,196
Wyoming	1,340	1,657	739	982	803	283	925
United States of America	4,010,114	3,416,840	3,183,063	1,304,286	1,706,822	1,737,433	1,962,298

Chinese Americans figures include Taiwanese Americans; Data for the territories (except Puerto Rico) is from American FactFinder's 2010 United States census data

== See also ==
- List of U.S. cities with Asian American majority populations
- Middle Eastern Americans
