= Telugu Americans =

Americans of Telugu birth or descent

అమెరికా తెలుగువారు Amerikā Teluguvāru
- The spread of the Telugu language in the United States according to the 2000 U.S. Census.

Total population
- 733,527 (People in Telugu-language households, 2024)

Regions with significant populations
- Central New Jersey; Northern Virginia; New York City; Philadelphia metropolitan area; Massachusetts; San Francisco Bay Area; Georgia; Michigan; Washington; North Carolina; Minnesota; Maryland; Ohio; Texas Triangle; Chicago metro area; Greater Los Angeles

Languages
- Predominantly: Telugu; American English

Related ethnic groups
- Telugu people; Indian Americans; South Asian Americans; Bengali Americans

Telugu Americans (Telugu: అమెరికా తెలుగువారు, romanized: Amerikā Teluguvāru) are Americans of Telugu descent or heritage. The community has its principal origins in the Telugu-speaking regions of Andhra Pradesh and Telangana in India. The Telugu diaspora in the United States developed largely after Indian independence, with migration including students, scientists, engineers, physicians, and other professionals.

The Telugu-speaking population of the United States grew substantially during the late 20th and early 21st centuries. In the 2024 American Community Survey, an estimated 605,544 people aged five and older reported speaking Telugu at home. Earlier Census-derived estimates counted 222,977 Telugu speakers in 2010 and 415,414 in 2017, an increase of 86 percent over seven years.

== History and migration ==
=== Early presence and immigration restrictions ===
Telugu emigration predates the development of a substantial Telugu community in the United States. During the colonial period, Telugu migrants traveled primarily to British and French colonial territories in regions including Southeast Asia, Africa, the Indian Ocean and the South Pacific. Bhat and Bhaskar distinguish this older migration from the Telugu diaspora in the United States, which they describe as principally a post-independence phenomenon.

Individual Telugu-speaking people nevertheless lived in the United States before the emergence of a larger postwar community. Philosopher Jiddu Krishnamurti, who was born into a Telugu-speaking family in Madanapalle, moved to Ojai, California, in 1922 and maintained a residence there for much of the remainder of his life. Biochemist Yellapragada Subbarow, who was born into a Telugu family in the West Godavari region, later studied at the Harvard School of Tropical Medicine in Boston and joined Harvard Medical School after receiving his diploma in tropical medicine in 1924.

Their presence occurred during a period of severe restrictions on immigration from Asia. The Immigration Act of 1917 established the Asiatic Barred Zone, while allowing exemptions for categories including professionals and students and their families. The Immigration Act of 1924 further restricted Asian immigration by barring immigrants considered ineligible for citizenship. The Luce–Celler Act of 1946 later extended naturalization rights and an immigration quota to Indians.

=== Postwar and post-1965 migration ===
Telugu migration to the United States became more sustained after Indian independence. In an ethnographic study of migration from Coastal Andhra, scholar Sanam Roohi found families whose members had gone to the United States for higher education as early as the 1950s and described the region as sending significant numbers of migrants to the United States from the 1960s onward.

The Immigration and Nationality Act of 1965 abolished the national-origins quota system and established an immigration framework that gave preference to highly skilled immigrants and family reunification. Roohi identifies the legislation as an important turning point for migration from Coastal Andhra, after which physicians, engineers, scientists, pharmacists and other highly skilled workers migrated to the United States in greater numbers. Existing family and community networks also helped circulate information about educational opportunities, medical residencies, employment and immigration procedures.

=== Community formation ===
Informal cultural gatherings preceded the growth of formal Telugu organizations in the United States. Bhat and Bhaskar report that Telugu films were difficult to obtain in the country during the 1950s and 1960s and that film prints acquired by immigrants were circulated among Telugu communities in different states. Film screenings became occasions for Telugu immigrants to gather, and the authors link these recurring gatherings to the subsequent development of Telugu cultural associations.

The Telugu Association of Greater Chicago was established in 1971, followed by the growth of additional regional and local Telugu associations. As the Telugu population in the United States expanded during the 1970s, efforts were also made to establish a national organization. The Telugu Association of North America (TANA) came into being with its first convention in 1977. Telugu associations developed activities centered on maintaining the language and cultural identity, organizing festivals and literary programs, supporting second-generation cultural activities, and maintaining social and institutional links with India.

=== Information technology and student migration ===
The growth of the information-technology industry produced a later expansion of Telugu migration. In her study of Coastal Andhra migration, Roohi describes software engineers who began moving to the United States from the late 1980s as a second major migration wave, following the earlier migration of medical, scientific and other professionals. This movement intensified around the turn of the 21st century, with many technology workers entering through the H-1B visa program and contract employment. Family members, friends and village networks already present in the United States frequently assisted later migrants.

Higher education became an increasingly important pathway during the 2000s. Roohi describes a subsequent migration stream in which families in Andhra Pradesh invested in American master's-level education, particularly in computer science and related fields, as a route to employment in the United States. Bhat and Bhaskar also identify the expansion of professional education in India and economic liberalization after 1990 as factors contributing to increased migration by Telugu students and professionals.

A 2014 Brookings Institution study of F-1 student-visa records found that Hyderabad, a major city in the Telugu-speaking region, sent 26,220 students to the United States between 2008 and 2012. Approximately 20,800, or 80 percent, studied in STEM fields. Because the Brookings data classify students by city of origin rather than ethnicity or language, the Hyderabad figures include students from non-Telugu backgrounds.

== Dispersion ==
Telugu people constitute one of the largest groups of Indian Americans. The majority of Telugu Americans live in metropolitan areas with significant economic importance in STEM fields. These areas include the Bay Area, the Texas Triangle, Philadelphia metropolitan area, Chicagoland, Central Jersey, Northern Virginia, Research Triangle, as well as the Seattle and Baltimore metropolitan areas. Smaller, but significant populations of Telugu Americans exist throughout the country in other metropolitan and micropolitan areas of almost every state. These include Greater Boston, Kansas City, Metro Detroit, Greater Cleveland, and Minneapolis–Saint Paul.

== Religion ==
An academic study of Telugu immigrants in the United States notes that Telugu associations have promoted Telugu identity through activities including the celebration of festivals at local Hindu temples. In 1989, a group of Telugu-speaking Hindus in New Jersey organized the Hindu Temple and Cultural Society to establish a temple with Venkateswara as its principal deity. A 2023 NPR profile of Telugu families in Novi, Michigan, documented the celebration of Diwali and household worship of Hindu deities.

Telugu-language Christian congregations have also been documented in the United States. Research archived by Harvard University's Pluralism Project describes Telugu-language Christian worship and multiple Telugu congregations in the Chicago metropolitan area. The 2018 scholarly volume Diaspora Christianities: Global Scattering and Gathering of South Asian Christians also includes a chapter devoted to the global Telugu Christian diaspora.

== Language ==
A recent study by the American Center for Immigration Studies showed Telugu as the fastest growing language in United States, which has grown by 86% in the last seven years.

During the 2020 United States elections, the Telugu language was first listed on voter registration and ballot boxes in select locales.

The states with the highest percentages of Telugu speakers are:

Serial No	The states with the highest percentages of Telugu speakers	
Serial No	State	Percentage (%)
1	New Jersey	0.35
2	Delaware	0.25
3	Virginia	0.25
4	Connecticut	0.18
5	Illinois	0.17
6	Texas	0.16
7	California	0.15
8	Maryland	0.15
9	Georgia	0.14
10	New Hampshire	0.13
11	Washington	0.13
12	Massachusetts	0.13
13	Kansas	0.13
14	Michigan	0.12
15	Minnesota	0.11
16	North Carolina	0.10
17	Arizona	0.10
18	Pennsylvania	0.09
19	Ohio	0.07

== Notable people ==
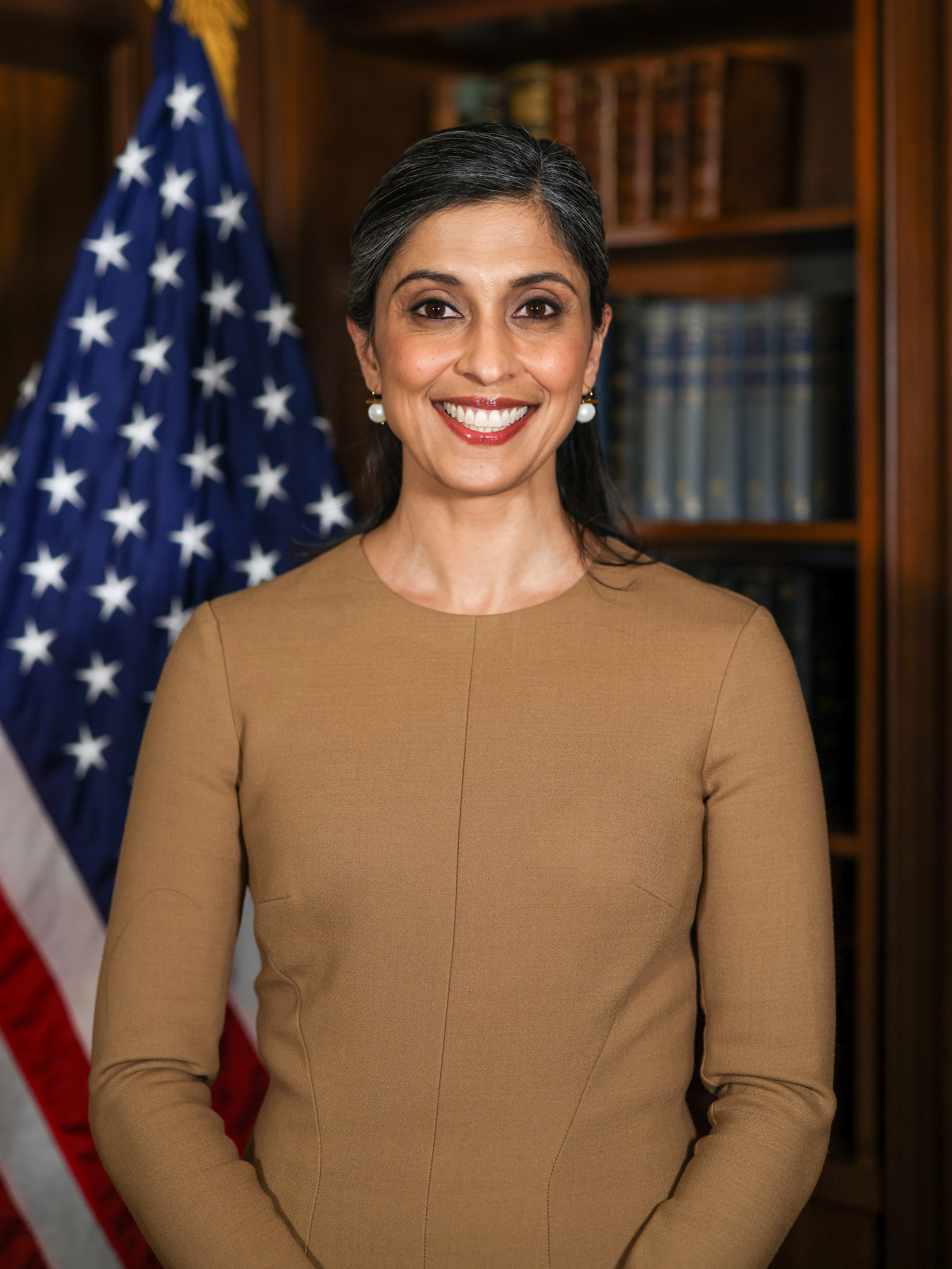
Usha Vance, First Second Lady Of Us of Indian Origin, Telugu Origin

=== Government, politics, and philanthropy ===
- Upendra J. Chivukula, Democratic politician who currently serves as a Commissioner on the New Jersey Board of Public Utilities after serving more than 12 years in the New Jersey General Assembly, where he had been the Deputy Speaker
- Narayana Kocherlakota, Economist, former president of Federal Reserve Bank of Minneapolis
- Kris Kolluri, Commissioner of Transportation, New Jersey
- Aruna Miller, Democratic Lieutenant Governor of Maryland, former member of the Maryland House of Delegates representing District 15 in Montgomery County, Maryland
- Sashi Reddy, Entrepreneur, venture capitalist, and philanthropist
- Usha Vance, Second Lady of the United States & Spouse Of United States Vice President JD Vance.
- Vinai Thummalapally, Executive Chairman of Red Fort Strategies, U.S. ambassador to Belize (2009–2013)

=== Medicine, science, and technology ===
- C. R. Rao, A prominent statistician
- Satya Nadella, CEO of Microsoft
- Raj Reddy, Computer scientist, founder of the Robotics Institute at Carnegie Mellon University, winner of Turing Award
- Vijaya Gadde, Business executive and former global lead of legal, policy, and trust at Twitter
- Yellapragada Subbarao, Indian biochemist who discovered the function of adenosine triphosphate as an energy source in the cell
- Neeli Bendapudi, president of Penn State University, former president of University of Louisville
- Ravi V. Bellamkonda, Vinik Dean of Engineering at Duke University's Edmund T. Pratt Jr. School of Engineering
- Dabeeru C. Rao, Director of the Division of Biostatistics at Washington University School of Medicine
- G. S. Maddala, Mathematician and economist best known for work in the field of econometrics
- J. N. Reddy, Professor and holder of the Oscar S. Wyatt Endowed Chair in Mechanical Engineering at Texas A&M University
- Satya N. Atluri, Professor of mechanical & aerospace engineering at University of California, Irvine
- Balamurali Ambati, American ophthalmologist, educator, and researcher. On May 19, 1995, he entered the Guinness Book of World Records as the world's youngest doctor.
- Vamsi K. Mootha, Physician-scientist, investigator of the Howard Hughes Medical Institute, and professor of Systems Biology and of Medicine at Harvard Medical School
- Rao Remala, First Indian employee at Microsoft
- E. Premkumar Reddy, Molecular biologist/Molecular oncology. Director of Experimental Cancer Therapeutics program and Professor in the Departments of Oncological Sciences and Structural and Chemical Biology at the Mount Sinai School of Medicine.
- V. Mohan Reddy, Pediatric cardiothoracic surgeon at Stanford University
- Seshagiri Mallampati, Anesthesiologist who invented the Mallampati score for measuring the ease of endotracheal intubation
- Mathukumalli Vidyasagar, Control theorist
- Dattatreyudu Nori, Vice Chairman of the Radiation Oncologist Department at The New York-Presbyterian Hospital/Weill Cornell Medical College in New York City
- Sirisha Bandla, Second India-born woman to go to space through Virgin Galactic Unity 22 mission
- Ramani Durvasula, Clinical psychologist and professor of psychology at California State University, Los Angeles. Her practice and research deals with narcissism and its impact on relationships and society as a whole.
- Sudhir Venkatesh, Sociologist and urban ethnographer
- S. Rao Kosaraju, Professor

=== Activism, arts, literature, and media ===
- Jeff Bhasker, Record producer
- Vijaya Lakshmi Emani, Social activist, posthumously awarded Presidential Citizens Medal
- Saagar Enjeti, Co-host of Breaking Points and The Hill
- Uma Pemmaraju, Anchor and host on the Fox News Channel cable network
- Aneesh Chaganty, Film director
- Ashok Kondabolu, DJ, rapper, former member of hip-hop group Das Racist
- Hari Kondabolu, Stand-up comedian
- Aparna Nancherla, Comedian, actress, and voice actor of Hollyhock on Netflix show BoJack Horseman
- Rushi Kota, Actor
- Sarayu Rao, Actress
- Aryan Simhadri, Actor
- Ajay Naidu, Actor
- Varun Sandesh, Actor
- Adivi Sesh, Actor, director, and writer
- Akash Vukoti, TV personality
- Raja Kumari, Singer
- Vivek Maddala, Emmy-winning composer, recording artist and engineer
- 6ix (record producer), Grammy award winning music producer for rapper Logic (rapper)
- Nina Davuluri, Miss America 2014
- Pratima Yarlagadda, Miss Indiana and finalist in Miss USA (1999)
- Sreeleela, Actress
- Avantika Vandanapu, Actress
- Danny Pudi, Comedian and actor
- Bhaskar Sunkara, Founder and editor of Jacobin, an American socialist magazine
- Manohar Arrabally and Sarala Yerrabelly, winners of the famed 2012 court case 'Matter Of Arrabally and Yerrabelly' which allows traveling outside the United States on Advance Parole without facing inadmissibility bars upon return to the United States provided an I-485 is pending

=== Sports ===
- Laxmi Poruri, Tennis player
- Kumar Rocker, Baseball player
- Geetika Kodali, an international cricket player
- Saiteja Mukkamalla, an international cricket player
- Arjun Nimmala, Baseball player
- James Blackmon Jr., Basketball player
- Sahith Theegala, Professional golfer
- Nishesh Basavareddy, Tennis player

== Social issues ==
Telugu Americans have suffered from hate crimes in America. The most notable of these incidents was the 2017 Olathe, Kansas shooting, in which a white supremacist, Adam Purinton, harassed two Telugu immigrants, Srinivas Kuchibhotla and Alok Madasani, under the pretense that they were Iranians and or illegal immigrants. Purinton proceeded to shoot them, killing Kuchibhotla and wounding Madasani, as well as Ian Grillot, a White American who had come to their defense.

Aishwarya Thatikonda, a Telugu immigrant from Hyderabad and a Dallas resident, was a victim of the 2023 Allen, Texas outlet mall shooting.

== See also ==
- Tamil Americans
- Indian Americans
