= Tamil Americans =

Americans of Tamil birth or descent

தமிழ் அமெரிக்கர்கள் Tamiḻ Amerikkarkaḷ
- The language spread of Tamil in the United States according to U. S. Census 2000

Total population
- 356,924 (0.1%) (Note: Statistic includes all speakers of the Tamil language, as many multi-generation individuals do not speak the language as a mother tongue, but instead as a second or third language.)

Regions with significant populations
- New Jersey; New York; San Francisco Bay Area; Chicagoland; Baltimore-Washington; Northern Virginia; Research Triangle; Seattle Metropolitan Area; Twin Cities; Metro Atlanta; Greater Houston; Dallas-Fort Worth Metroplex; Greater Miami; Greater Boston; Metro Detroit; Philadelphia metropolitan area; Ohio; Greater Los Angeles

Languages
- Tamil; American English

Religion
- Hinduism; Christianity; Islam; Jainism; Irreligion

Related ethnic groups
- Tamil people; Indian Americans; Sri Lankan Americans; Malaysian Americans; Singaporean Americans, Telugus, Telugu Americans, Bengali Americans

Tamil Americans (Tamil: தமிழ் அமெரிக்கர்கள், romanized: tamiḻ amerikkarkaḷ) are Americans who are of Tamil origin. The majority of Tamil Americans come from the Indian state of Tamil Nadu. Significant minorities are from other Indian states like Karnataka, Kerala, Andhra Pradesh, etc., as well as from other places such as Sri Lanka, Malaysia, Singapore, South Africa, Southeast Africa, Fiji, Mauritius, Réunion, Guyana, and Trinidad and Tobago.

In 2000, the number of Tamil speakers in the US numbered approximately 50,000 individuals. By 2010 the number surged to 127,892 and grew to 293,907 by 2022. The growth of the Tamil population in the United States is attributed to the H-1B visa program, and the presence of a large number of Tamil students studying in American universities.

== Demographics ==
In the second half of the 20th century, Tamils from India migrated as skilled professionals to the United States, Canada, Europe, and Southeast Asia. The Tamil American population exceeds 356,924 individuals. The Federation of Tamil Sangams of North America functions as an umbrella organization for the growing community.

Central New Jersey is home to the largest population concentration of Tamil Americans. Sizeable populations of Indian American Tamils have also settled in New York City, and New Jersey and New York house separate Tamil Sangams. Several metropolitan areas including the Washington, D.C. metropolitan area on the East Coast as well as Silicon Valley on the West Coast also have Tamil associations.

The New York City and Los Angeles metropolitan areas are home to the largest concentrations of Tamil-speaking Sri Lankan Americans. New York City's Staten Island alone is estimated to be home to more than 5,000 Sri Lankan Americans, one of the largest Sri Lankan populations outside Sri Lanka itself, with an estimated 40% of Sri Lankan Americans being Sri Lankan Tamils.

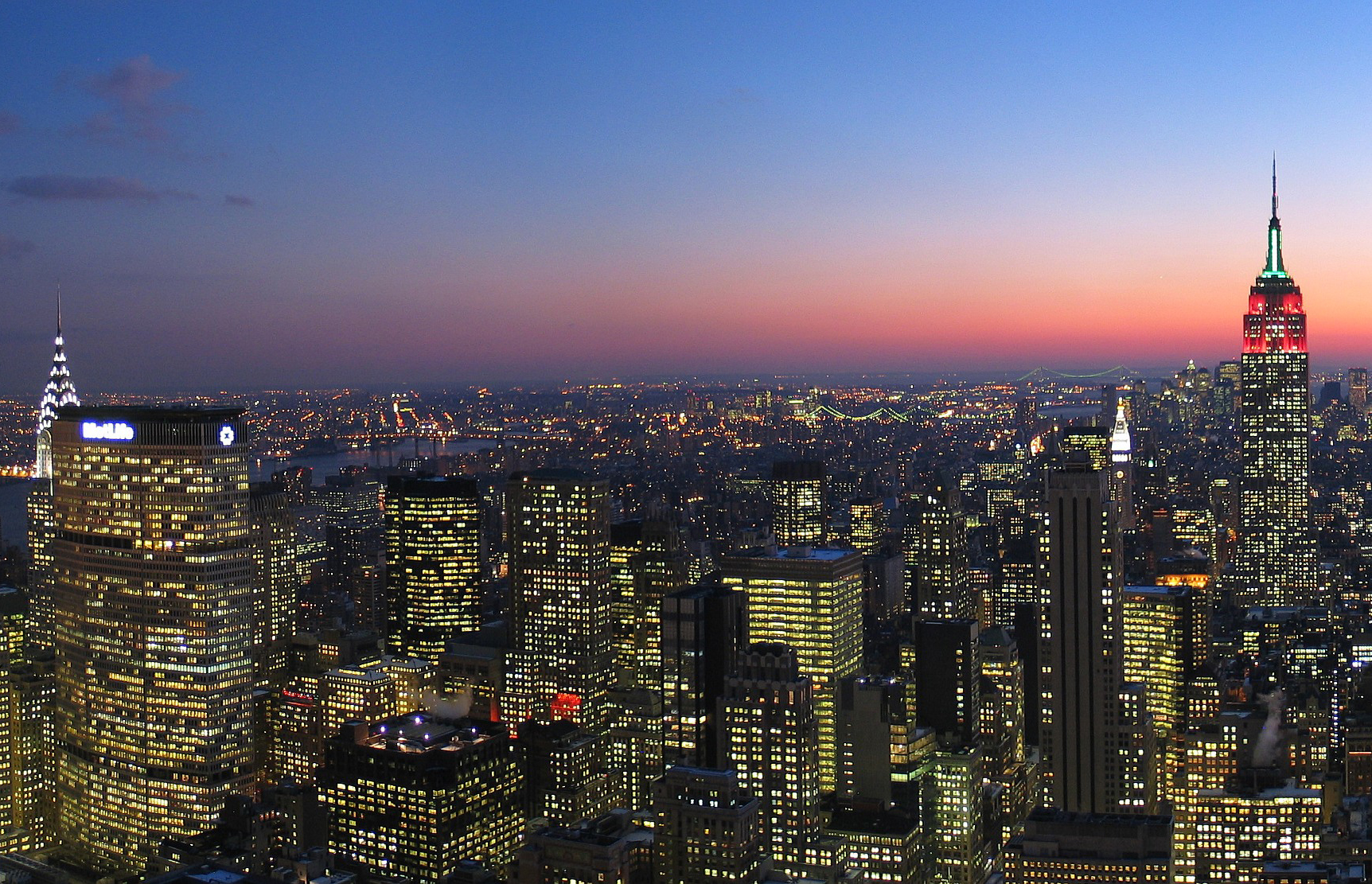
The New York City Metropolitan Area, including Central New Jersey, as well as Long Island and Staten Island in New York, is home to the largest Tamil American (தமிழ் அமெரிக்கர்கள்) population.

== Language ==
The Indian Tamil community in the United States is largely bilingual and can speak English and Tamil to some extent. Tamil is taught in weekly classes in many Hindu temples and by associations such as the American Tamil Academy across the country.

The language's written form is highly formal and quite distinct from the spoken form. A few universities, such as the University of Chicago and the University of California, Berkeley, have graduate programs in the language.

== Religion ==
The Indian Tamil community is majority-wise connected to the Hindu community. In most Hindu temples in the United States, the prayers are in Sanskrit. However, in North Brunswick, New Jersey, the "Tamil Temple" ("Tamil Annai Thirukkoyil") conducts all the prayers in the Tamil language. The Hindu Temple in Houston, Texas, is dedicated to Meenakshi, a manifestation of the goddess Parvathi. There are also active Tamil Christian and Muslim minorities, as well as Jains and Buddhists. Tamil Muslims also hold a Tamil Muslim Community Sangam-Iman America/QMFUSA.

== Notable people ==
=== Academia ===
- Subrahmanyan Chandrasekhar – Astrophysicist and Nobel laureate
- Raj Chetty – Economist, professor of economics at Harvard University renowned for his research on equality of opportunity in the United States
- G. V. Loganathan – Professor and a victim of the Virginia Tech massacre
- C. Mohan – Computer scientist
- Sendhil Mullainathan – Economist, Harvard professor
- Sethuraman Panchanathan – Executive Vice President, Knowledge Enterprise Development and Chief Research Innovation Officer at Arizona State University
- Arogyaswami Paulraj – Wireless researcher, winner of Marconi Prize
- V. S. Ramachandran – Physician, neuroscientist, director of the Center for Brain and Cognition at the University of California, San Diego
- Venkatraman Ramakrishnan – Structural biologist and Nobel laureate
- Ramamurti Shankar - Scientist
- Maya Shankar – Scientist
- Siva Sivananthan – Academic, scientist, businessman and Director of the Microphysics Laboratory at the University of Illinois at Chicago
- Subra Suresh - Former President of Carnegie Mellon University
- Stanley Jeyaraja Tambiah – Social anthropologist
- S. R. Srinivasa Varadhan – Mathematician

=== Arts & Entertainment ===
- Ashok Amritraj – Indian-American film producer
- Aziz Ansari – Actor and stand-up comedian
- Supriya Ganesh - Actress (Samira Mohan) from The Pitt
- Sunkrish Bala – Actor
- Jay Chandrasekhar – Actor and director
- Vali Chandrasekaran — Screenwriter and producer
- Devan Ekambaram – Singer
- Vijay Iyer – Pianist
- Poorna Jagannathan – Actress and producer
- Clarence Jey – Record producer and songwriter
- Mindy Kaling – Actress
- Padma Lakshmi - Author, actress, model, television host
- Mary Anne Mohanraj – Writer
- Lara Raj – Katseye member
- Sendhil Ramamurthy - Film and television actor
- A. K. Ramanujan – Poet
- M. Night Shyamalan – Film director
- Sid Sriram – Singer
- S. J. Sindu – Writer
- Raleigh Rajan – Music composer, songwriter and multi instrumentalist
- Prashanth Venkataramanujam – Actor, television writer, and producer; head writer and producer of Patriot Act
- Divya Victor – Poet

=== Business ===
- Krishna Bharat – Computer scientist; founder of Google News
- Vasant Narasimhan - chief executive officer (CEO) of Novartis
- Indra Nooyi – chairwoman and former CEO of PepsiCo Incorporated
- Sundar Pichai - chief executive officer (CEO) of Google
- Raghuram Rajan – Economist, winner of Fischer Black Prize
- Ram Shriram – Billionaire venture capitalist
- Raj Rajaratnam – Founder of Galleon Group
- Chandrika Tandon – Businesswoman and artist

=== News & Journalism ===
- Sukanya Krishnan – News anchor
- Hari Sreenivasan – Broadcast journalist

=== Politics & Law ===
- Kamala Harris – 49th Vice President of the United States
- Maya Harris – Lawyer, public policy advocate, and television commentator
- Raja Krishnamoorthi – U.S. Representative from Illinois
- Nimi McConigley – Former U.S. Representative from Wyoming
- Visvanathan Rudrakumaran - Prime Minister of the Transnational Government of Tamil Eelam, former legal advisor for the Tamil Tigers
- Sri Srinivasan – United States circuit judge
- Nithya Raman — Mayor-elect of Los Angeles
- Vivek Ramaswamy – Entrepreneur, author and candidate in the 2024 Republican Party presidential primaries from Ohio
- Suhas Subramanyam – U.S. Representative from Virginia
- Pramila Jayapal – U.S. Representative from Washington
- Susheela Jayapal — Politician from Oregon
- Savita Vaidhyanathan – Politician, former mayor of Cupertino
- Arvind Venkat – U.S. Representative from Pennsylvania

=== Religion ===
- Ananda Coomaraswamy – Philosopher & Historian

=== Sports ===
- Vijay Amritraj – Tennis player and commentator
- Prakash Amritraj – Tennis player and commentator
- Stephen Amritraj – Tennis player
- Varun Ram – College basketball player

== Social issues ==
Savitha Shan, a University of Texas at Austin student, was a victim of the 2026 Austin bar shooting.

== See also ==
- Indian Americans
- South Asian Americans
- Telugu Americans
- Punjabi Americans
- Nepalese Americans
