= E. Premkumar Reddy =

Indian geneticist

E. Premkumar Reddy is a molecular biologist specialising in molecular oncology. He is the Director of Experimental Cancer Therapeutics program and Professor in the Departments of Oncological Sciences and Structural and Chemical Biology at the Mount Sinai School of Medicine.

== Education ==
Reddy obtained his PhD in molecular biology in 1971 from the Regional Research Laboratory and Osmania University, Hyderabad, India. He completed post-doctoral training in the United States of America at the UCLA School of Medicine and the National Cancer Institute (NCI).

== Professional career ==
He joined the National Cancer Institute after his post-graduation, with which he was associated till 1984 as the chief of the molecular genetics section. In 1984, he moved to Hoffman LaRoche Roche Institute of Molecular Biology as a full member and in 1986, he joined the Wistar Institute as their deputy director. In 1992, he was appointed as the Director of the Fels Institute for Cancer Research and Molecular Biology, which is affiliated with Temple University. He moved to the Mount Sinai School of Medicine in 2010. Reddy served as a member of the board of directors of NIEHS from 1990-1995. In 1993, he was awarded the Scientific Achievement Award by the American Cancer Society.

He has published over 250 papers. The most notable of his findings are the molecular cloning and sequence determination of a number of viral oncogenes and their cellular homologues. According to data published in 2000 by the Institute for Scientific Information, which compiled the list of most highly cited authors, Reddy was amongst the top 0.5% of the most highly cited authors in the world.

Reddy co-founded the international cancer journal Oncogene in 1986, for which he served as an Editor from 1986 to 2009. In 2010, he founded a new cancer journal named Genes & Cancer for which he serves as the Editor-in-Chief.
