= Suraj Budathoki =

American politician

Member of the New Hampshire House of Representatives from the Hillsborough 40th district
- In office December 4, 2024 – May 28, 2026
- Succeeded by: Robert Richard-Snipes (elect)

Personal details
- Born: Samrang, Bhutan
- Party: Democratic
- Spouse: Ganga Thapa
- Education: Southern New Hampshire University (BA); Norwich University (MA)

Suraj K. Budathoki is an American politician. He served as a Democratic member for the Hillsborough 40th district of the New Hampshire House of Representatives.

== Early life and education ==
Budathoki was born in Samrang, Bhutan. Of Lhotshampa heritage, he left the country as a child due to political persecution and ethnic cleansing of the minority group. He spent 19 years in a refugee camp in Nepal before coming to the United States in 2009 as a refugee.

He earned a Bachelor of Arts from Southern New Hampshire University in 2015 and a Master of Arts from Norwich University in 2018. He is currently a PhD candidate at Saybrook University.

== Career ==
Budathoki's career experience includes working as a business executive. He and his wife, Ganga, founded Building Community in New Hampshire, formerly known as the Bhutanese Community of New Hampshire, an organization focused on refugee resettlement, economic development, and civic integration programs for immigrant populations in the state.

In 2016, he worked on Bernie Sanders’ presidential campaign in New Hampshire as a deputy political director.

In 2019, he co-founded Peace Initiative Bhutan (PIB), a nonprofit organization focused on advocacy for Bhutanese refugees and for congressional action on human rights in Bhutan.

In 2024, he was elected to the New Hampshire House of Representatives. His election made him the first Bhutanese American elected to a state legislature. He resigned in May 2026.
