= American Chamber of Commerce in Sri Lanka =

The American Chamber of Commerce in Sri Lanka represents a large number of Business, Trade, Information Technology and Investment related organizations which are engaged their activities in between Sri Lanka and the United States of America.

== See also ==
- Chamber of commerce
- Sri Lankan American
- United States Chamber of Commerce
- U.S. Women's Chamber of Commerce
- United States Commercial Service
- Ceylon Chamber of Commerce
