= South Asian Americans =

People of South Asian descent in the United States

Total population
- 6,517,231; 1.95% of the total US population (2023)

Regions with significant populations
- California · New Jersey · New York · Texas · Illinois · Georgia · Florida · Massachusetts · Maryland · Virginia · Washington · Pennsylvania · Michigan · Ohio · Connecticut

Languages
- Lingua franca English; ACS most common South Asian languages (in descending order); Hindi–Urdu · Telugu · Gujarati · Bengali · Tamil · Punjabi · Nepali · Marathi · Malayalam · Kannada · Sindhi · Sinhala · other South Asian languages Other languages with official or provincial status in South Asia (in alphabetical order): Assamese; Balochi; Bangladeshi English; Boro; Dogri; Dzongkha; Indian English; Kashmiri; Kokborok; Konkani; Lepcha; Maithili; Maldivian; Meitei; Mizo; Nepalese English; Odia; Pakistani English; Pashto; Santali; Sikkimese; Sri Lankan English; Other languages spoken by the double diaspora (in alphabetical order): Afrikaans; Antillean Creole; Australian English; British English; Canadian English; Fiji Hindi; French; Gulf Arabic; Guyanese Creole; Guyanese Hindustani; Jamaican English (Jamaican Patois); Kutchi-Swahili; Malaysian Tamil; Mauritian Bhojpuri; Mauritian Creole; Memoni; New Zealand English; Portuguese; Sarnami Hindustani; South African English; Spanish; Surinamese Dutch; Swahili; Trinidadian English (Trinidadian Creole); Trinidadian Hindustani; Ugandan English; various other Caribbean English dialects

Religion
- Mainly; Hinduism · Christianity · Islam · Sikhism · Irreligion; Minority; Jainism · Buddhism · Zoroastrianism · Baháʼí · Judaism

Related ethnic groups
- Indian Americans; Pakistani Americans; Bangladeshi Americans; Nepalese Americans; Sri Lankan Americans; Maldivian Americans; Bhutanese Americans; Indo-Caribbean Americans; Indo-Fijian diaspora; Bengali Americans; Gujarati Americans; Malayali Americans; Pashtun Americans; Punjabi Americans; Sindhi Americans; Tamil Americans; Telugu Americans; Romani Americans; South Asian Canadians; British South Asians; Dutch South Asians; South Asian diaspora; Indian diaspora; Pakistani diaspora; Bangladeshi diaspora; Nepalese diaspora; Sri Lankan diaspora

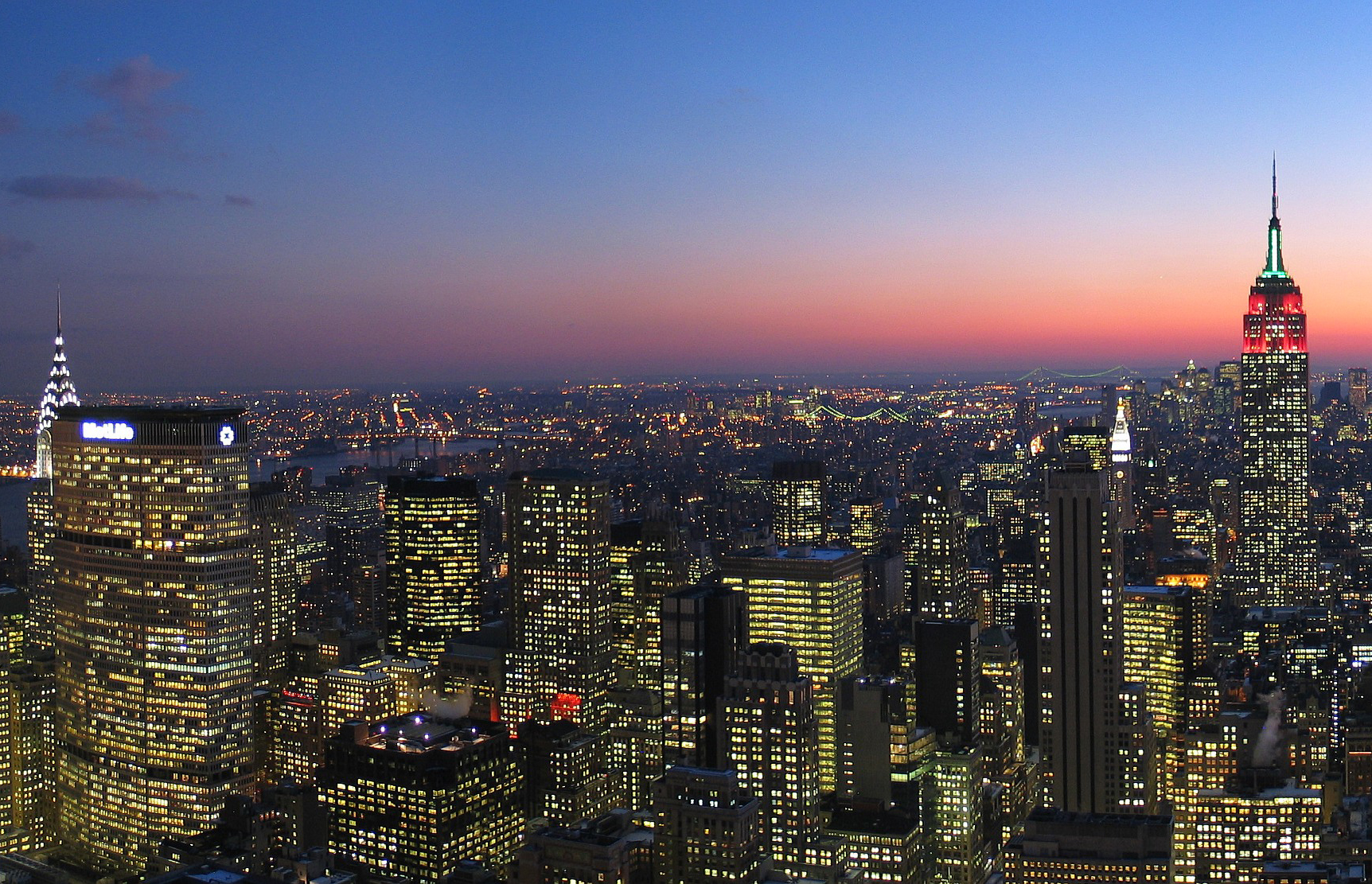
The New York City Metropolitan Area, including New York City, Central New Jersey, as well as Long Island in New York, is home to the largest South Asian American population.

South Asian Americans are Americans of South Asian ancestry. The term refers to those who can trace back their heritage to South Asia, which includes the countries of India, Pakistan, Bangladesh, Nepal, Sri Lanka, Bhutan, and the Maldives. The South Asian American diaspora also includes the double diaspora of generations of South Asians from other areas in the world who then moved to the United States, countries such as Guyana, Trinidad and Tobago, Uganda, Kenya, Tanzania, Canada, the United Kingdom, the Netherlands, France, Australia, New Zealand, Fiji, South Africa, Mauritius, the United Arab Emirates, Kuwait, Qatar, Saudi Arabia, Bahrain, Mozambique, Réunion, Singapore, Malaysia, Jamaica, Suriname, and other Caribbean countries. In the United States census, they are a subcategory of Asian Americans, although individual racial classification is based on self-identification and the categorization is "not an attempt to define race biologically, anthropologically, or genetically".

== Background ==
=== History ===
In the United States, South Asian Americans have had a presence since the 1700s, emigrating from British India. Classically, they were known as East Indians or Hindoos in North America to differentiate them from the Native Americans, who were also known as Indians, as well as from Black West Indians. With the arrival of immigrants from Bengal and Punjab, their population increased significantly in the 1800s. Since interracial marriage with white persons was illegal and South Asian immigrant men were unable to bring over wives from their home countries, Hindu and Muslim South Asian immigrant men married Catholic Mexican women.

=== Identification ===
Most Indian Americans do not identify as South Asian American or Asian American, raising concerns for the viability of it as a classification. The term "South Asia" is considered synonymous to the Indian subcontinent. According to a 2021 survey, just 10% of Indian Americans identified as "South Asian American", with "Indian" and "Indian American" making up the majority at 68%. This further breaks down by differing religious identities, just 5% of Hindus of Indian descent in America identify as "South Asian", whereas 27% of Muslims of Indian descent in America identify as "South Asian". Indian Americans who were Christians are more than twice as likely to identify as "American" than Hindus of Indian descent.

== Demographics ==
South Asian Americans are one of the fastest growing groups in the United States, increasing in population from 2.2 million to 4.9 million from 2000 to 2015. Around one third of the group lives in the Southern United States, with the population nearly tripling in the South between 2000 and 2017. According to the US census, between 2000 and 2018 the Indian American population grew by nearly 150 percent and had a median income of $100,000 in 2015.

Following is the list of South Asian diasporas living in the U.S. arranged according to their 2017 population estimated by the US Census Bureau.

- Indian Americans (5,160,203)
  - Indo-Caribbean Americans (232,817)
  - Indo-Fijian Americans (30,890)
- Pakistani Americans (684,438)
- Bangladeshi Americans (600,000)
- Nepalese Americans (223,930)
- Sri Lankan Americans (84,526)
- Bhutanese Americans (20,462)
- Other South Asian Americans (14,230)

=== Geographic distribution in US ===
South Asians are in the highest concentration in the New York City metropolitan area, with other significant concentrations in California, Texas, and Illinois. As of 2012 the metropolitan areas with the largest South Asian populations are New York, San Francisco Bay Area, Chicago, Washington D.C., Los Angeles, Dallas-Fort Worth, and Houston. The states containing the fastest growing metro areas with 5,000 or more South Asians are Washington, California, Nevada, Arizona, Texas, Pennsylvania, Virginia, North Carolina, and Florida.

=== Religion ===
Religion remains a cornerstone for identity amongst South Asian Americans. Amongst South Asians, Hinduism and Islam are the most prominent. 48% to 54% of Indian Americans identify as Hindu and 60% of Pakistani-Bangladeshi Americans follow Islam.

== Societal involvement ==
=== Government and politics ===
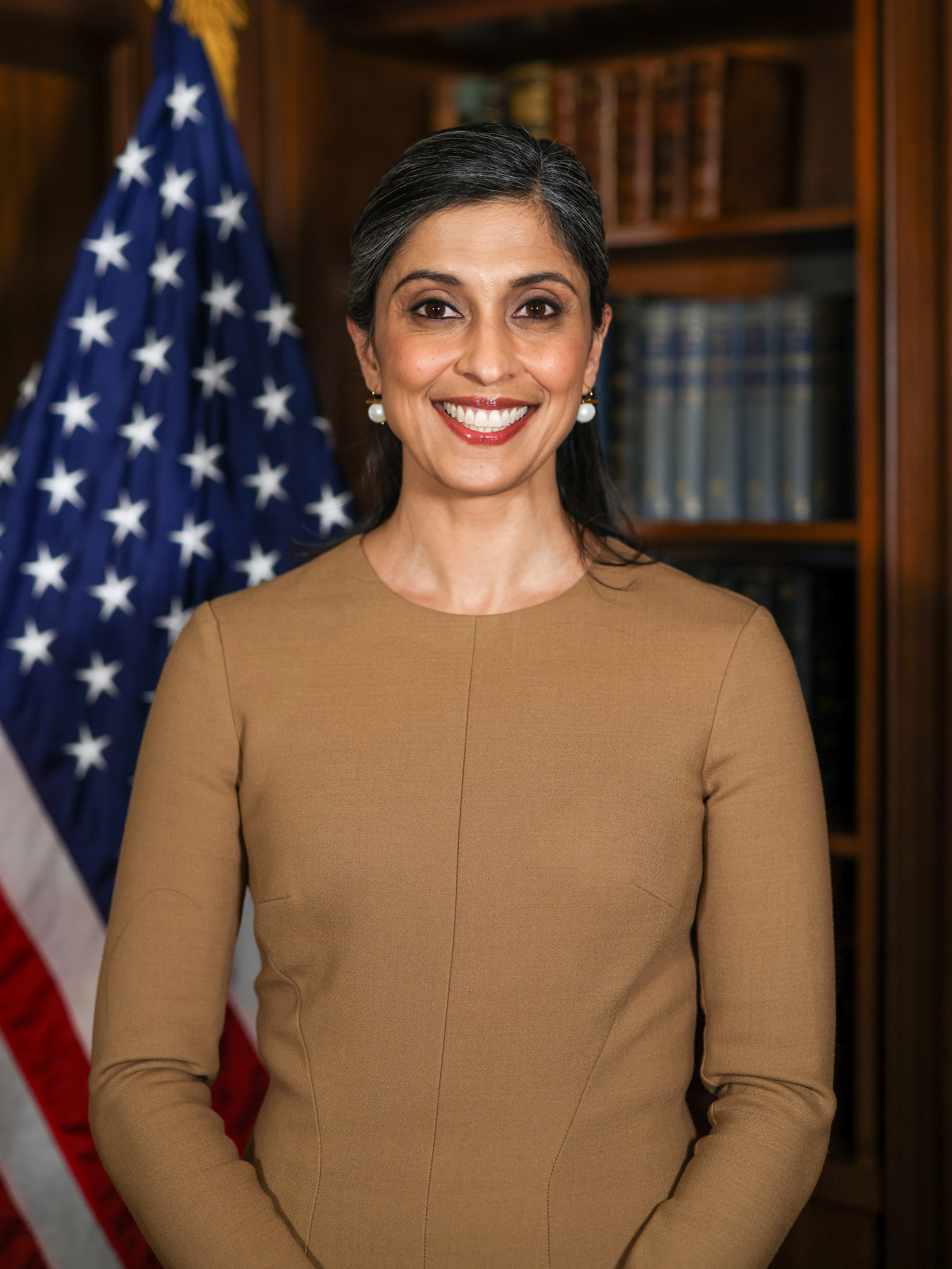
Usha Vance, the current Second Lady

After July 2, 1946, under the Luce–Celler Act, Indians were permitted to hold citizenship in the United States. The Act allowed a quota of 100 immigrants per year from India and allowed Indian nationals who were already residing in the US to become naturalized.

In 1957, Dalip Singh Saund of California became the first Asian American in the United States House of Representatives. In 2017, Ravi Bhalla became the mayor of Hoboken, New Jersey, making him the first Sikh to be elected to the position. In the same year, Kamala Harris became a US Senator from California.

In 2010, Nikki Haley ran for governor of South Carolina. When she took office in 2011, she made history as the first woman and the first person of an ethnic minority to hold the governorship. During her first term South Carolina's economy grew steadily as the jobless rate fell, prompting her reelection in 2014. In November 2016, then President-elect Trump selected her to serve as the US ambassador to the United Nations. She left this office in December 2018. In 2023, she announced that she was running for president in 2024, saying it was "time for a new generation".

In 2019, South Asian Americans were typically enrolled as Democrats. In September 2019, 50,000 Indian Americans gathered in Houston, Texas to listen to Indian Prime Minister Narendra Modi. The event, entitled "Howdy, Modi!" was also attended by then President Trump. This was the largest-ever gathering with a foreign political leader in the United States.

In a study in 2020, Indian Americans strongly identified with the Democratic Party and did not show a strong shift to the Republican Party. For the 2020 election, a study showed that 72% of registered Indian American voters planned on voting for Biden and the Democratic Party.

In 2020, Kamala Harris became the Democratic vice presidential nominee in the 2020 presidential election, when Joe Biden chose her as his running mate, making her the first African American and South Asian American vice presidential running mate on a major party ticket. The election was won by Joe Biden making Harris the first female and first African American and South Asian American to be held at such a high office.

Zohran Mamdani won the November 4, 2025 New York City mayoral election with 50.4% of the vote, defeating Andrew Cuomo and Curtis Sliwa. At age 34, he became the city’s first Indian-origin, first South Asian, and first Muslim mayor. He ran on a bold progressive platform focused on affordability: rent freezes, free buses, higher minimum wage, and higher taxes on the wealthy.

=== News media ===
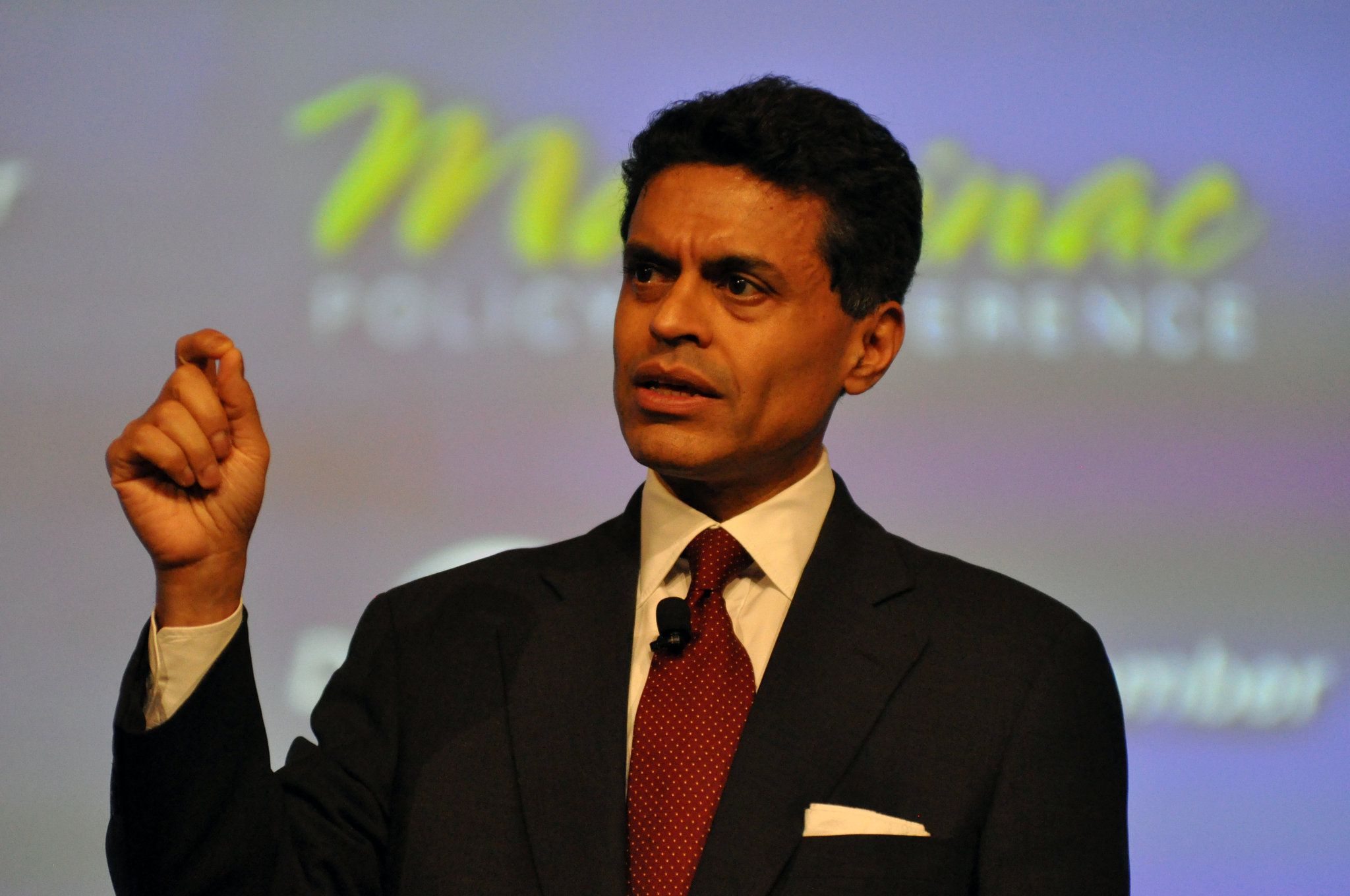
Fareed Zakaria hosts CNN's Fareed Zakaria GPS and writes a weekly paid column for The Washington Post.

Amna Nawaz is a correspondent and substitute anchor for the PBS NewsHour and Hari Sreenivasan is a correspondent for the NewsHour and the weekend anchor for the NewsHour. Fareed Zakaria has been a columnist for Newsweek, editor of Newsweek International, and an editor at large of Time. Kiran Chetry, a former CNN newsreader is South Asian (Nepalese) through her father's side. Sree Sreenivasan is a journalist and co-founder of SAJA. He is also a visiting professor at Stony Brook University School of Journalism in New York.

=== Education ===
South Asian Americans are often over-represented as university graduates in US census data. Indians ages 25 and older have the highest levels of education among Asian Americans in the US. As of 2019, over 75% of Indians ages 25 and older held bachelors and higher level degrees. In contrast, only 15% of Burmese Americans are likely to hold college degrees. In 2021, in Fairfax County, Virginia, a legal case has been filed by a group of Asian American parents against the school board in federal court for overhauling admission procedures which they claim now discriminates against Asian American students. The new policies have decreased Asian American representation at the prestigious Thomas Jefferson high school and a case is now pending if the new admission criteria are legal and indeed race-neutral as claimed by the school board.

=== Organizations ===
There are a number of organizations formed by and for the representation of South Asian Americans in a number of fields and industries, including in alphabetical order:

- South Asian Americans Leading Together
- South Asian American Digital Archive
- South Asian Journalists Association
- South Asian Bar Association of North America
- Network of Indian Professionals of North America
- Queer South Asian National Network
- Mann Mukti
- South Asians in Sports
- South Asian Mental Health Initiative and Network - SAMHIN
- South Asian Public Health Association - SAPHA
- ASANA Voices - ASANA Voices

=== Podcasts and publications ===
The Juggernaut focuses on telling stories of the South Asian diaspora and global South Asians at large.

Shankar Vendantam founded and hosts the famous NPR podcast and radio show, Hidden Brain, which discusses various influences that can manipulate our brains with or without our awareness. American Born Cultured Desi podcast converses over the struggles and effects of living as an ABCD (an American Born Confused Desi) and how to balance these two identities and cultures more easily. South Asian Trailblazers is podcast by Simi Shah that examines the careers and journeys of South Asian American leaders and entrepreneurs in various sectors. The Woke Desi podcast discusses various topics familiar to South Asians growing up in the United States and providers a forum where listeners can relate to stories and also become empowered to showcase their identity proudly. The Brown People We Know podcast sharing inspiring interviews with South Asians who have nontraditional life journeys and experiences. South Asian Stories is a podcast that interviews South Asians from around the world, from various walks of life, to discuss their identities, life journeys, failures and successes. Chaat Room, a podcast started by Brown Girl Magazine, recognizes South Asians in Hollywood.

Brown Girl Magazine is an online publication, founded by Trisha Sakhuja-Walia, to give representation to South Asian American writers and particularly South Asian American women, to write their stories and to build a community of empowerment through storytelling and dialogues.

== Culture ==
Culturally, many South Asians identify themselves using a demonym called Desi, Which in the U.S. becomes Desi American.

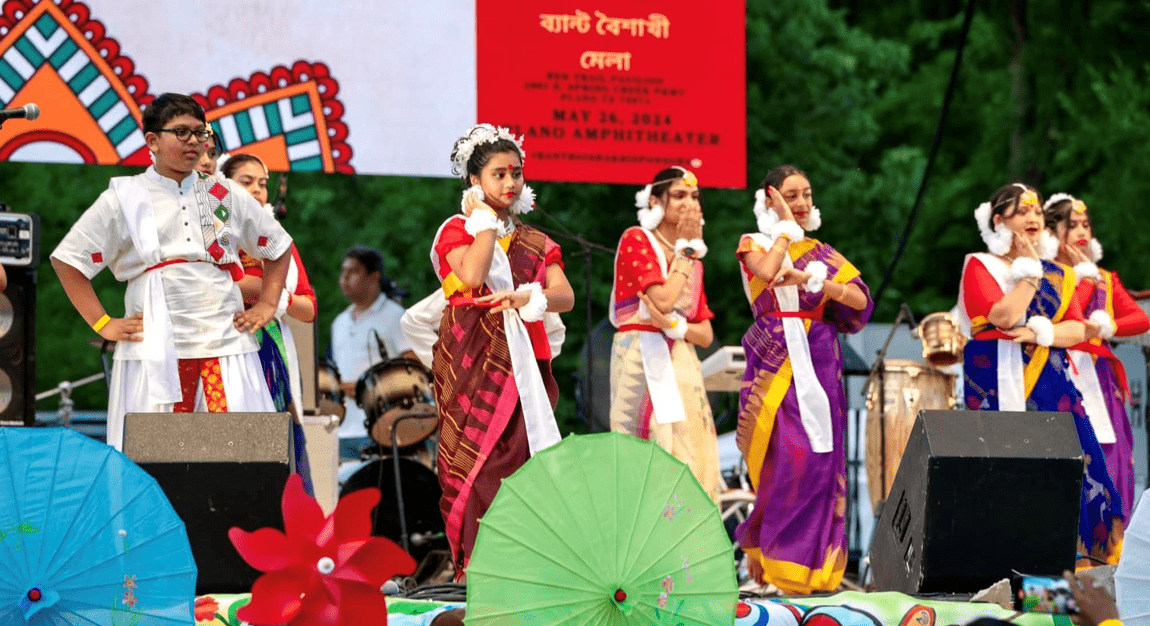
Pohela Boishakh celebrations by Bengali Americans at Dallas, Texas, USA (2024)

=== Cuisine ===
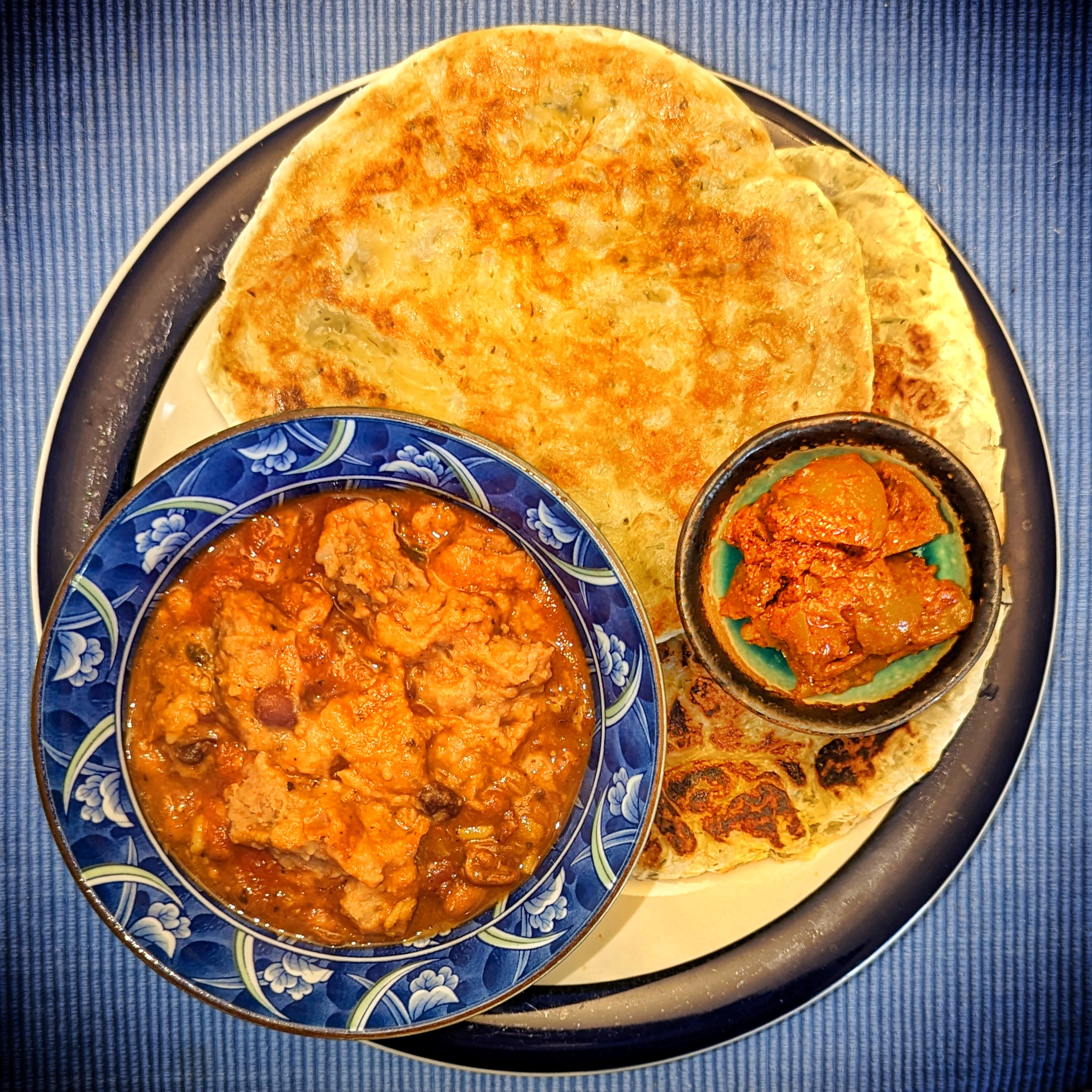
Chili and beans with a paratha

South Asian cuisine has grown in the United States in the early 21st century, with the diaspora creating new kinds of fusion food.

Padma Lakshmi is a television host, author, and entrepreneur. She is the creator, host, and executive producer of the docuseries Taste the Nation with Padma Lakshmi on Hulu.

=== Entertainment ===
Notable actors and entertainers include Mindy Kaling, Hannah Simone, Aziz Ansari, Kumail Nanjiani, Kunal Nayyar, Kal Penn, Manish Dayal, Avantika Vandanapu and Hasan Minhaj.

Never Have I Ever, a South Asian American comedy drama featured on Netflix in 2020 created by Mindy Kaling and Lang Fisher. It's a show that has been noted for its representation of South Asians in America and a young woman's coming of age story and her connection to her culture and ethnicity.

Nina Davuluri was the first woman of South Asian descent to become Miss America in 2014.

Comedian and actor Hari Kondabolu is a successful performer in the US, famously known for his documentary "The Problem with Apu" which examined the implications of the cartoon character Apu on The Simpsons and its effect on young South Asian Americans growing up in US.

=== Fashion ===
Prabal Gurung, a Nepalese American fashion designer based in New York is an established name in the fashion industry. Anita Dongre has been a mainstay in India's fashion scene with her clothing and jewelry designs, but when Kate Middleton wore one of her dresses in 2016, she became a global name. She has a flagship store in New York City, and other celebs who have worn her creations are Beyoncé, Sophie Turner, and Priyanka Chopra. Naeem Khan is an Indian-American fashion designer based in New York City known for dressing First Lady Michelle Obama, Queen Noor of Jordan, and the Princess of Wales in his ornate gowns.

Deepica Mutyala, an Indian American entrepreneur and YouTuber, is the founder and CEO of Live Tinted, a digital platform and beauty line focused on underrepresented beauty.

Priyanka Ganjoo, an Indian American entrepreneur, is the founder and owner of Kulfi Beauty, a South Asian-owned brand available at Sephora.

Akash Mehta and Niki Mehta, Indian American entrepreneurs, are the founders of Fable & Mane, known for its HoliRoots products and focuses on conscious, plant-based health care.

=== Fine arts ===
Rina Banerjee is a well known artist whose paintings are inspired by Indian miniature paintings, Chinese silk paintings, and Aztec drawings. Salman Toor is a Pakistani American artist in New York city focusing on queer brown men and South Asian identity and xenophobia. Huma Bhabha is a Pakistani American multimedia artist and her work is inspired by science fiction and she creates monumental sculptures that lack clear backgrounds.

=== Literature ===
The origins of South Asian American literature began in the early 20th century with the writings of Punjabi Mexican Americans. South Asian literature began to receive greater attention in the United States starting in the late 20th century, due to the general rise in American interest in India and the contemporary success of English-speaking South Asian authors in other countries.

Jhumpa Lahiri is a Pulitzer Prize winning author, best known for her book, The Namesake, and a professor of creative writing at Princeton University. Kiran Desai, winner of the Man Booker Prize, and is known for the well acclaimed novel, Hullabaloo in the Guava Orchard. Chitra Banerjee Divakaruni is an author and poet and known for her novels on fantasy and magical realism.

Samrat Upadhyay, a Nepalese American writer is the first writer of Nepali descent to be published in the West. His collection of short stories, Arresting God in Kathmandu was published in 2001. Upadhyay is a professor of creative writing at Indiana University.

=== Music ===
Famous musicians include Curtis Waters, Arthur Gunn, Sameer Gadia—lead singer of Young the Giant, and Norah Jones, daughter of Indian musician Ravi Shankar. Shilpa Ray is an indie and punk rock musician from Brooklyn.

Settled in Santa Cruz, California is the family of legendary singer, composer and songwriter Pandit Shiv Dayal Batish who taught Indian music at the University of California and founded the Batish Institute of Indian Music and Fine Arts in the early 1970s. After he died in 2006, the music institute is now run by his son Ashwin Batish and his grandson Keshav Batish both following musically in the footsteps of the elder Batish. The Institute was the third of its kind after ones set up by Ustad Ali Akbar Khan in San Rafael and Pandit Ravi Shankar in Southern California.

=== Sports ===
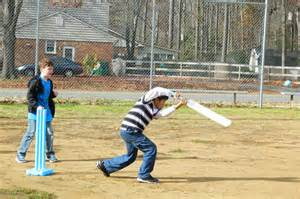
South Asian cricket batter in Virginia

Mohini Bharadwaj Barry and Raj Bhavsar are two notable and famous Indian American gymnasts. Mohini became the second oldest gymnast to perform in the Olympics in 2004. That same year, Raj Bhavsar was an alternate on the US men's gymnastics team. In 2008, Raj competed with the men's team and won a bronze medal.

In 2003, Gibran Hamdan was drafted by the Washington Redskins and the first player of Pakistani descent in the NFL. Another South Asian player in the NFL was Brandon Chillar. Brandon was a linebacker and drafted by the St. Louis Rams in the 2004 NFL Draft. He played for the Green Bay Packers. Arjun Nimmala made history by becoming the first ever first-generation Indian American player drafted into the MLB in 2023. He ranked 11th overall on MLB Pipeline prospect rankings. Arjun was selected 20th overall in the first round by the Toronto Blue Jays and officially signed with the team July 2023.

Cricket, a very popular sport in South Asia, is still growing in popularity with South Asian American youth, and especially among Millennial and Gen Z youth as they can watch the sport online and more easily identify as global citizens. Major League Cricket, an American league, has been buoyed by South Asian American support.

== Customs and traditions ==
=== Marriage ===
Arranged marriage is still observed in some South Asian American families and communities throughout the United States. Marriage data specifically on Asian Americans and Indian Americans shows that interracial marriages are not as common. In 2014, the Pew Research Center found that only 14% of Indian Americans married outside of their ethnic group. Studies show that while many South Asian Americans may date outside of their ethnic group, they end up marrying someone who is considered more compatible and appropriate by society standards. Being raised in the United States, South Asian Americans are part of a culture that encourages dating prior to marriage. But culturally, South Asian American families have different expectations for them than that promoted by Western culture.

=== Holidays celebrated ===
Diwali, also known as Deepavali, is one of the most important festivals in Hinduism. The holiday also has significance for Sikhs and Jains, and is celebrated not just in India, but in Nepal, Malaysia, Singapore, and other countries with South Asian diasporas. There are an estimated 3.45 million Muslims in America. While American Muslims are from a wide variety of ethnic backgrounds—including African American, South Asian, Arab, African, Persian, European, Southeast Asian, and Turkish—Eid-al-Adha is a major holiday celebrated for all Muslims.

== Social and political issues ==
=== Caste ===
For half of the Hindu Indian American population, caste identification remains important as 8 in 10 identify as "general" or upper caste. For US-born, caste identification is not as vital, however, after the 2020 discrimination lawsuit against Cisco, caste as become a focal point in the public view.

=== Discrimination ===
One in two Indian Americans claim skin color is the most common basis for discrimination. US-born South Asians are more likely to claim discrimination than foreign-born South Asians. South Asian Americans also report feeling both singled out and discriminated against in schools. Due to the Asian Exclusion Act of 1917, the community's growth was severely hindered until it was repealed in 1965.

=== LGBT communities ===
It has been reported in American media that the group has certain stigmas in relation to the LGBT communities.

=== Politics in South Asia ===
In 2019, a group of South Asian Americans petitioned the Bill & Melinda Gates Foundation to cancel a planned award for Indian Prime Minister Narendra Modi.

=== Poverty ===
Among South Asians in the US, Bhutanese Americans have the highest poverty rates by a significant margin (33.3 percent) with Nepali Americans (24.2 percent) the next highest.

== Health disparities ==
South Asian Americans face high incidence and prevalence of Type 2 Diabetes Mellitus (T2DM), averaging 28% prevalence compared to 6% in White Americans (Gujral, 2020). T2DM, in the United States, is linked to obesity and a sedentary physical lifestyle. However, studies show SAAs face increased risk of diabetes at a lower body mass index and at younger ages (Shah, 2014). Visceral fat deposit, lower muscle mass, insulin resistance, and improper B-cell function are biological factors that cause higher rates of T2DM in SAAs, by increasing glucose levels in bloodstream. The biological factors above are also influenced by epigenetic, where transgenerational stress from repeated famine affects insulin resistance, although the specific mechanism remains to be revealed (Gujral, 2020). Diet and exercise also play a huge role in T2DM as South Asian diet consists largely of saturated fat, trans fat, and refined carbohydrates, and do not follow CDC recommendation of 150 minutes of moderate exercise (Ali, 2021). New studies show culturally appropriate interventions aimed at weight loss and physical exercise can lower HbA1C levels (Patel, 2017).

== See also ==
- American-Born Confused Desi
- Bengali Americans
- Bangladeshi Americans
- Bhutanese Americans
- Indian Americans
- Indo-Caribbean Americans
- Maldivian Americans
- Nepalese Americans
- Pakistani Americans
- Romani Americans
- Sri Lankan Americans
- South Asian Canadians
