= Robert Richard-Snipes =

American politician

Member-elect of the New Hampshire House of Representatives from the Hillsborough 40th district
- Assuming office December 2026
- Succeeding: Suraj Budathoki

Personal details
- Party: Democratic

Robert Richard-Snipes is an American politician. A member of the Democratic Party, he is the member-elect for the Hillsborough 40th district of the New Hampshire House of Representatives.
