= Maldivian Americans =

މޯލްޑިވިއަން އެމެރިކާ މީހުންނެވެ (Dhivehi)

Total population
- 733 (2020 census)

Regions with significant populations
- California

Languages
- American English • Maldivian

Related ethnic groups
- South Asian Americans

Maldivian Americans are Americans whose ethnic origins lie fully or partially in any part of the Maldives.

== Population ==
According to the United States Census Bureau, in 2000, there were 51 Maldivians in the United States. By 2010, the population of Maldivians in the United States increased to 127. In 2020, Maldivians in the US were 733 people.

== See also ==
- Maldives–United States relations
