= Bhutanese Americans =

Americans of Bhutanese birth or descent

Bhutanese Refugees in America
འབྲུག་མི་ཨ་མི་རི་ཀ། (Dzongkha)

Total population
- 46,146 (ancestry or ethnic origin; US census in 2020); 71,000 Bhutanese refugees in USA (according to the United Nations High Commissioner for Refugees in USA in 2013)

Regions with significant populations
- Vermont (Burlington) • New Hampshire • Maryland (Baltimore) • Colorado (Denver, Boulder) • Ohio (Akron, Columbus, Cleveland, Toledo) • South Dakota (Sioux Falls) • North Dakota (Grand Forks, Fargo) • Kentucky (Louisville, Bowling Green) • Massachusetts (Boston, Worcester) • Pennsylvania (Harrisburg, Erie, Pittsburgh, Scranton, Lancaster) • Nebraska (Omaha) • Michigan (Lansing, Grand Rapids) • Utah (Salt Lake City) • New York (New York City, Buffalo, Syracuse, Rochester) • California • Wisconsin (Milwaukee) • Atlanta, • Louisiana (New Orleans) • Texas (El Paso) • Arizona, New Mexico

Languages
- English • Dzongkha • Nepali

Religion
- Buddhism • Hinduism

Related ethnic groups
- Lhotshampa • South Asian Americans • Bhutanese people • Nepalese Americans • Tibetan Americans • Burmese Americans

Bhutanese Americans are Americans of Bhutanese descent. According to the 2010 census, there are 19,439 Americans of Bhutanese descent. However, many Nepali-Bhutanese came to the US via Nepal as political refugees from that country and are registered as Nepali Americans; often leading to the actual numbers of Bhutanese Americans being underreported. More than 92,323 Bhutanese Nepalis have been resettled in the United States, with the largest single community being approximately 27,000 in Columbus, Ohio.

== Demography ==
According to the 2010 census, there are 19,439 Bhutanese Americans. However, many Bhutanese came to the US from Nepal as political refugees from that country. These political refugees formed, according to estimates of June 20, 2010, a population of 27,926 people in the United States. Many Bhutanese Americans are of the Hindu faith. The others are Kiratas, Buddhist, and Christians.

=== Bhutanese Lhotshampa ===
Many of the Bhutanese living in the United States were actually ethnic minorities of Nepalese descent. This was because, between the late 1980s and early 1990s, thousands of Bhutanese were driven out of Bhutan, as they were considered by the government of that country as "illegal immigrants" because they did not have the required proof that was needed to tag them as a citizen of Bhutan. Despite this, however, these Bhutanese came from families who had been living in Bhutan for more than two centuries. The government's goal was to maintain the Tibetan ethnic purity of most of the population. Thus, since 1990, more than 105,000 ethnically Nepali Bhutanese refugees temporarily migrated to neighboring Nepal, from where their ancestors came, establishing in refugee camps in the east of the country. However, after 15 years living in exile in the neighboring country, many of them have migrated to the US, Europe and Australia. This emigration to the United States is due, at least in large part, to a program coordinated by the US State Department and the U.N. High Commissioner for Refugees. Of the 60,000 Bhutanese - Nepali refugees that US has offered to migrate in the country, according to BBC News on June 20, 2010, had already 27,926 lived in USA. However, in October 2013, the United Nations High Commissioner for Refugees estimated that around 71,000 Bhutanese refugees living in the US.

According to the International Organization for Migration, the Bhutanese refugees are sent to places such as New York City, Chicago, Syracuse (New York), and St. Louis (Missouri). The refugees are also sent to states such as Texas, Arizona, Maryland, and Oregon. The community is being helped by The Hindu Temple of Minnesota, along with Lutheran and Catholic social organizations who give them materials and moral support.

In 2014, Connecting Cleveland, a four-page paper with stories in English and Nepali was launched to serve Nepali-speaking Bhutanese families in the Cleveland, Ohio area.

In 2020-2021, Connecting Cleveland founder Hari Dahal, a Bhutanese American, registered the non-profit as Connecting Cleveland Community, Inc. The non-profit has helped Greater Cleveland immigrant families whose members often work in frontline jobs in the service industry where early in the pandemic the virus was spreading fast. Bhutanese Americans youths under Hari Dahal's leadership have found a group in early 2020 - called Nebham LLC - that create various technological solutions and apps for nonprofits and businesses run by Bhutanese Americans.

=== Communities in the United States ===
As of the 2010 US census, the cities, suburbs, and towns with the largest percentages of Nepali Bhutanese Americans were:

- Clarkston, Georgia - 11.95%
- South Salt Lake, Utah - 7.42%
- Winooski, Vermont - 6.35%
- Tukwila, Washington - 2.88%
- Burlington, Vermont - 2.04%
- Somerville, Massachusetts - 1.87%
- Des Moines, Washington - 1.68%
- Harrisburg, Pennsylvania - 1.68%
- Scranton, Pennsylvania - 1.41%
- Akron, Ohio - 1.19%
- Erie, Pennsylvania - 1.03%
- Concord, New Hampshire - 0.96%
- Lansing, Michigan - 0.87%
- Syracuse, New York - 0.86%
- Lancaster, Pennsylvania - 0.77%
- Twin Falls, Idaho - 0.75%
- Grand Forks, North Dakota - 0.72%
- Worcester, Massachusetts - 0.72%
- Fargo, North Dakota - 0.7%
- Rochester, New York - 0.66%
- Boulder, Colorado - 0.63%
- Buffalo, New York - 0.5%
- SeaTac, Washington - 0.42%
- Sioux Falls, South Dakota - 0.41%
- Columbus, Ohio - 0.37%
- Bowling Green, Kentucky - 0.36%
- Omaha, Nebraska - 0.35%
- Aurora, Colorado - 0.32%
- Everett, Washington - 0.31%
- Nashville, Tennessee - 0.28%
- Grand Rapids, Michigan - 0.27%
- Louisville, Kentucky - 0.25%
- Baltimore, Maryland - 0.23%
- Charlotte, North Carolina - 0.22%
- Fairbanks, Alaska - 0.21%
- Cleveland, Ohio - 0.19%
- Tucson, Arizona - 0.14%
- Salt Lake City, Utah - 0.14%
- Portland, Oregon - 0.13%
- Anchorage, Alaska - 0.08%

According to census estimates for 2018-2022 from the Migration Policy Institute, there were 48,600 immigrants from Bhutan in the US, the top counties of which were:

1) Franklin County, OH .................................. 4,200

2) Allegheny County, PA ................................ 2,900

3) Summit County, OH ................................... 2,700

4) Dauphin County, PA ................................... 2,400

5) Licking County, OH .................................... 1,800

6) Hamilton County, OH ................................ 1,800

7) Cuyahoga County, OH ............................... 1,600

8) DeKalb County, GA .................................... 1,300

9) Monroe County, NY ................................... 1,200

10) Mecklenburg County, NC ........................ 1,000

11) Arapahoe County, CO .............................. 1,000

== Community and social issues ==
=== Suicide ===
A trouble in the community is the high rate of suicide. In 2008, more than 30 Bhutanese refugees, shortly after resettlement in the United States, committed suicide. From 2009 to 2012, 16 more suicides among the Bhutanese community had occurred. According to an article in The Wall Street Journal in 2013, 7 more Bhutanese refugees had committed suicide.

In a 2018 report released by the Centers for Disease Control and Prevention, for every 100,000 Bhutanese refugees, 24.4 committed suicide, almost double the rate of 12.4 for the US general population. This estimate was much higher than the estimated annual global suicide rate for all persons in the world, at 16 per 100,000 people.

=== Poverty ===
According to data released in 2017 by the Pew Research Center, 33.3% of the Bhutanese American community lived under the poverty line. This is more than twice the USA poverty average of 16% according to data released by the Economic Policy Institute in 2011.

=== Health ===
Many sources have indicated that 21% of all Bhutanese Americans have depression which is nearly 3 times the rate of the general American which stands at 6.7%. It has been observed that other mental illnesses are also prevalent among the community such as anxiety and PTSD.

=== Lack of education ===
According to the same date released by the Pew Research Center, the Bhutanese community has one of the lowest educational attainment level in the entire US with only 9% of all Bhutanese Americans 25 years old and older have at least a bachelor's degree.

=== Professionals ===
Bhutanese Americans own various businesses that serve the community and larger groups throughout the United States, e.g. Nebham LLC.

== Organizations ==
The Bhutanese American Association of Houston (BaaH) and the Association of Bhutanese in America (ABA) are two examples of Bhutanese American organizations. The Bhutanese American Association of Houston has an ESL program which provides elderly people in the community with the resources to learn English. In addition, ESL students are taken to various places and parks with recreational purposes to facilitate adaptation to the city. The Association of Bhutanese in America aims to establish relationships between US Bhutanese and Bhutanese in Bhutan and elsewhere, as well as establish a platform that favors their relationship with the community and their country of origin.

== Notable people ==
- Kiran Gajmer
- Suraj Budathoki

== See also ==
- Bhutanese refugees
- Nepalese Americans
- Bhutanese diaspora
