= Nepalese Americans =

Nepali diaspora in America

नेपाली अमेरिकी Nēpālī amērikī

Total population
- 223,930 (2023)

Regions with significant populations
- New York City Metropolitan Area; Washington Metropolitan Area; Texas; California; Ohio; Pennsylvania; Massachusetts; Virginia; Maryland; New York; Colorado; Georgia; Washington; North Carolina; Nebraska; New Hampshire; Utah; Idaho; Missouri; San Francisco Bay Area; Wisconsin; Louisiana

Languages
- English; Nepali (most spoken); Newar; Limbu; Gurung; Tamang; Magar; Tharu; Rai; Maithili; Bajjika; Angika; Bhojpuri; Awadhi; Magahi; Hindi; Urdu; Sherpa; Dzongkha; other languages of Nepal

Religion
- Majority; Hinduism; Minority: Buddhism; Kirat Mundhum; Christianity; Islam

Nepali Population History in the United States
Year	Pop.	±%
1990	2,616	—
2000	7,858	+200.4%
2010	51,907	+560.6%
2020	205,297	+295.5%
Source: United States Census Bureau

Nepalese Americans are Americans of Nepalese ancestry. Immigration from Nepal to the United States began in the 20th century, and many have been able to establish themselves as American nationals. The history of immigration from Nepal to America is more recent in comparison to other South Asian ethnic groups. Major community groups of Nepali Americans consists Newars, Tharus, Tamangs, Gurungs, Limbus, Rais, Magar, Lhotshampas, Sherpas, Bahuns and other Khas communities, as of American Nepalese Convention Survey of 2018.

The Nepali American population is the fastest growing Asian American population in the United States; in 2020, 219,503 Americans identified themselves as being of Nepali descent, an increase of 269% from the previous census of 2010, where 59,490 Americans identified themselves as Nepali.

== History ==
Nepali Americans began migrating to the United States in the early 20th century. The first Nepalese immigrants to enter the United States were classified as "other Asian". Nepalese Americans were first classified as a separate ethnic group in 1974 when 56 Nepalese people had immigrated to the United States. The number of immigrants from Nepal remained below 100 per year until 1992.

According to the 1990 U.S. Census, there were 2,616 Americans with Nepalese ancestry. Fewer than 100 Nepalese immigrants became U.S. citizens each year, but the number of Nepalese who become legal residents had grown steadily from 78 in 1987 to 431 in 1996. The Nepalese community experienced significant growth in population during the 2000s. The poor political and economic conditions caused by the Nepalese Civil War marked increased emigration from Nepal. Now, significant communities of Nepali-Americans exist in large metropolitan areas such as Texas, New York City, Boston, Chicago, Denver, Gainesville, Florida, Philadelphia, Portland, Oregon, and Saint Paul, Minnesota. Sizable numbers also live in various cities of California, such as Artesia (1.2% Nepalese American) and Sonoma (0.6%). Gradually, this community has been integrating into mainstream politics. Harry Bhandari became the first Nepalese American to be elected to public office when he won a State Delegate race in Maryland in 2018. Bhandari beat an incumbent and has become the first minority to win any election in the history of the majority White American district.

== Communities in the United States ==
As of 2010, the largest communities of Nepalese were in the following cities:

- New York, NY - 60,000 (0.07% of total populace)
- Columbus, OH - 20,000 (0.96% of total populace)
- Sonoma, CA - 2,352 (0.06% of total populace)
- Irving, TX - 1,507 (0.6% of total populace)
- Houston - 833 (0.03% of total populace)
- Somerville, MA - 752 (1.0% of total populace)
- Chicago - 534 (0.02% of total populace)
- Fort Worth, TX - 502 (0.07% of total populace)
- Arlington, VA - 473 (0.2% of total populace)
- Denver, CO - 413 (0.04% of total populace)
- Aurora, CO - 362 (0.1% of total populace)

According to estimates from the American Community Survey for 2015-2019, there were 140,900 Nepalese immigrants in the U.S. of that number, the top counties of settlement were as follows:

1) Queens County, NY -------------------------- 8,100

2) Tarrant County, TX ----------------------------- 6,300

3) Dallas County, TX ------------------------------- 4,900

4) Middlesex County, Mass ------------------- 3,500

5) Fairfax County, VA ----------------------------- 3,400

6) Harris County, TX ------------------------------ 2,900

7) Los Angeles County, CA -------------------- 2,600

8) Contra Costa County, CA ------------------ 2,500

9) Baltimore County, MD ----------------------- 2,400

10) Franklin County, OH ------------------------ 2,300

11) Alameda County, CA ----------------------- 2,100

12) Summit County, OH ------------------------ 2,000

13) Santa Clara County, CA ------------------ 2,000

14) Orange County, CA ------------------------- 1,800

15) Montgomery County, MD --------------- 1,800

16) Prince William County, VA -------------- 1,700

17) King County, WA ---------------------------- 1,600

18) Wake County, N.C. ------------------------- 1,500

19) DeKalb County, GA ------------------------ 1,500

20) Cook County, Illinois ---------------------- 1,500

21) Mecklenburg County, N.C. ------------- 1,400

22) Douglas County, NEB ---------------------- 1,400

23) Salt Lake County, UT ----------------------- 1,300

24) Hillsborough County, NH ----------------- 1,300

25) Dauphin County, PA ------------------------- 1,300

== Ethnic Nepali Bhutanese American ==
Bhutanese refugees are the group of people of Nepali origin who were expelled from Bhutan and temporarily settled in various refugee camps in the eastern parts of Nepal. Since 2008, many Bhutanese refugees have been resettled in different parts of the world and the U.S. There are 96,581 Bhutanese refugees in the U.S. alone. As many Bhutanese came to the U.S. from Nepal as political refugees from that country and are registered as Nepalese Americans; often leading to the actual numbers of Bhutanese Americans being underreported.

== Cultural celebrations ==
From the mid-1980s, the Nepalese community in the United States began to develop a series of social, cultural and charitable networks, which include the celebration of certain religious and cultural moments as Chhath, Dasain, Losar, Sakela, Tihar and the Nepali New Year. They also participated in local cultural events such as Pacific Rogers and Park Fest interfaith community festivals.

== Economic Demographics ==
=== Economics and Education ===
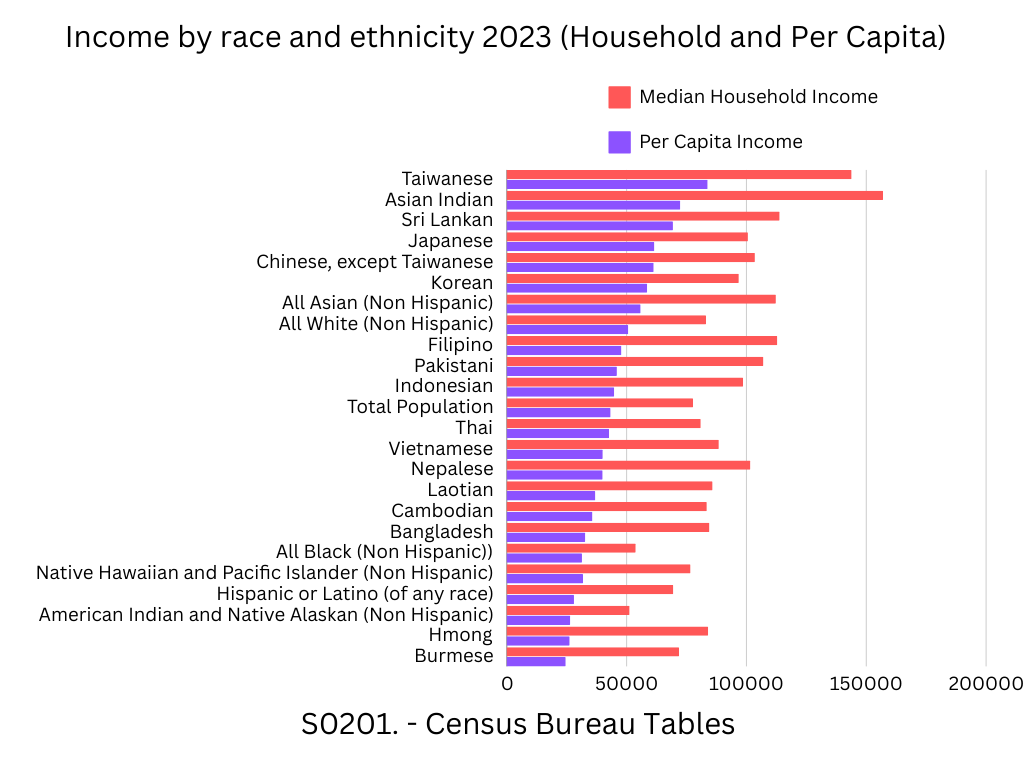
Income by race and ethnicity 2023 (Household and Per Capita) Shows Asian American groups and Nepalese Americans

According to data collected by the Pew Research Center, Nepali Americans used to have a lower median household income in 2019 of $55,000 a year.

However, in 2023, Nepalese Americans had a median household income of $101,641 which was higher than the total population of $77,719. However they also had a per capita income of $39,993 which was slightly lower than the total population's. The Nepalese poverty rate had also significantly decreased to 9.4% which was lower than the total population's of 12.5% This correlates with the high work force participation rate of 76.5% which was significantly higher than 63.8% for the total population.

They also had a high rate of people who had attained a bachelors degree of 51.3% which was significantly higher than the total population of 36.2%. However they showed a high rate of people without a high school diploma (19.5%), which was higher than for the whole country (10.2%).

Generally this shows significant upwards mobility over time for Nepalese Americans.

== See also ==
- List of Nepal-related topics
- Nepal
- Nepalese Canadians
- Nepalese Australians
- Nepalis in the United Kingdom
- Bhutanese Americans
- Nepal–United States relations
- Bengali Americans
