= Molecular oncology =

Interdisciplinary medical specialty

Molecular oncology is an interdisciplinary medical specialty at the interface of medicinal chemistry and oncology that refers to the investigation of the chemistry of cancer and tumors at the molecular scale. Also the development and application of molecularly targeted therapies.

== Main branches ==
Molecular oncology has identified genes that are involved in the development of cancer. Cancer arises as an abnormality in genomic control, either due to the activation of oncogenes or loss of functioning tumor-suppressor genes. Oncogenes result in an uncontrolled increase in cell proliferation; tumor-suppressor genes act as a brake, leading the cell cycle to stop and promote cell death when necessary. The research combined diverse techniques ranging from genomics, computational biology, tumour imaging, in vitro and in vivo functional models to study biological and clinical phenotypes. The proteins produced by these genes may serve as targets for novel chemotherapy drugs and other cancer treatments, or imaging scans. Scientists use a range of techniques to validate the role of the novel candidate genes in the development of cancer. The ultimate aim is to translate these findings into improved treatment options for cancer patients.

=== Gene targets ===
There are many different genes being researched for possible cancer therapies. Among the most studied are the p53 gene and the PTEN gene. These genes are major regulators of the cell cycle and other pathways involved in cellular and genomic integrity. By halting the cell cycle, these genes ensure that genetically damaged cells are not passing on that damage to daughter cells. The cell cycle may be paused and if the damage is severe enough, the p53 and PTEN gene pathways may signal for the death of the damaged cells. Both the p53 and PTEN genes are classified as tumor suppressors because their pathways oversee the repair of cells that may replicate out of control with damaged genetic material, eventually leading to cancer growth if not kept in check. Mutations in these genes are seen in more than half of human cancers.

== Molecular oncolytic therapies ==
=== Immunotherapy ===
Immune gene therapy is a targeted approach to cancer therapy where actual immune cells of the patient and their genes are manipulated to produce an anti-tumor response. The body's own immune system is used to attack the tumor cells, therefore the immune system can naturally attack the specific cancer cells again in the future if necessary. Many types of immunotherapies exist including bone marrow transplants, antibody therapies, and various manipulations of host immune cells to target and kill cancer cells. Cellular receptors, antigens, and cofactor molecules are some such cellular manipulations to target cancer cells.

==== Chimeric antigen receptor T Cell ====
Chimeric antigen receptor T cell immunotherapy (CAR-T), possibly combined with cytokines and checkpoint inhibitors, are a regularly used form of immune gene therapy. CAR-T involves manipulation of a patient's natural T cells to express a chimeric antigen receptor. This receptor, now on millions of the patient's T cells, recognizes cancerous cells that express specific antigens. Usually, the T cell antigen receptor is inactive but when the receptor recognizes a certain cancerous antigen, the physical structure of the T cell changes to destroy the cancer cell. This is a method of cancer treatment that works on the cellular and molecular level.

==== Combining CAR-T with checkpoint inhibitors, cytokines ====
Some regulatory proteins, specifically immune checkpoint inhibitors, have been found to reduce the ability of T cells to multiply within the body. In order to optimize the efficacy of CAR-T gene therapy, these checkpoint inhibitors can be blocked to stimulate a robust anti-tumor immune response, spearheaded by the CAR-T cells. There are various known inhibitory receptors on the CAR-T cell; through manipulation of these receptors and the molecules that bind them, expression of the CAR-T cell can be amplified.

CAR-T cells can also be combined with cytokines to improve the efficacy of the immunotherapy method. Cytokines are messenger molecules that can act on themselves, nearby cells, or distant cells. The signal pathways of these cytokines can be used to enhance CAR-T anti-tumor characteristics. For example, Interleukin 2 (IL2) is a cytokine that acts as a growth factor for various immune system cells, including T cells. In regards to gene therapy, IL2 can be used to increase replication and dispersing of CAR-T cells throughout the body.

==== Issues with CAR-T therapy ====
There is room for improvement with this gene therapy approach. Firstly, the antigens of interest expressed on the cancer cells may sometimes be expressed on regular body cells, too. This means the body's T cells will attack its own healthy cells instead of the cancer cells when the antigen is lacking specificity with just the cancer cell. A possible solution to this problem is to include two different antigen receptors on the CAR-T cells to make them even more specific. The second issue with the CAR-T immunotherapy approach is that it can cause cytokine release syndrome. This is when an excess of pro-inflammatory factors are released by the immune system and can cause unpleasant side effects for the patient like nausea and a high fever.

=== Gene therapy ===
In the past few decades, gene therapy has emerged as a targeted way to treat cancer. Gene therapy introduces foreign genetic sequences to diseased cells in order to change the expression of these cancerous cells that are functioning with severely damaged genomes. Cancer cells do not behave like normal cells, so the methods for ridding the body of these cells are more complicated. Manipulation of the pathways controlled by certain genes and their regulators are a large branch of cancer research.

== See also ==
- Oncology
- Molecular medicine
