= Sri Lankan Americans =

Americans of Sri Lankan birth or descent

Total population
- 84,526 (2023)

Regions with significant populations
- New York City Metropolitan Area (including New York City, Central New Jersey, and Long Island) Greater Boston, Los Angeles metropolitan area, Washington, D.C. metropolitan area, Atlanta metropolitan area, Dallas metropolitan area, Houston area, and other major American metropolitan areas

Languages
- English, Sinhala and Tamil

Religion
- Theravada Buddhism, Hinduism, Islam, Roman Catholicism

Sri Lankan Americans (Sinhala: Sri Lankika Amerikanu, Tamil: Ilangkaī Amerikan) are Americans of full or partial Sri Lankan ancestry. Sri Lankan Americans are persons of Sri Lankan origin from various Sri Lankan ethnic backgrounds. The people are classified as South Asian in origin.

== History ==
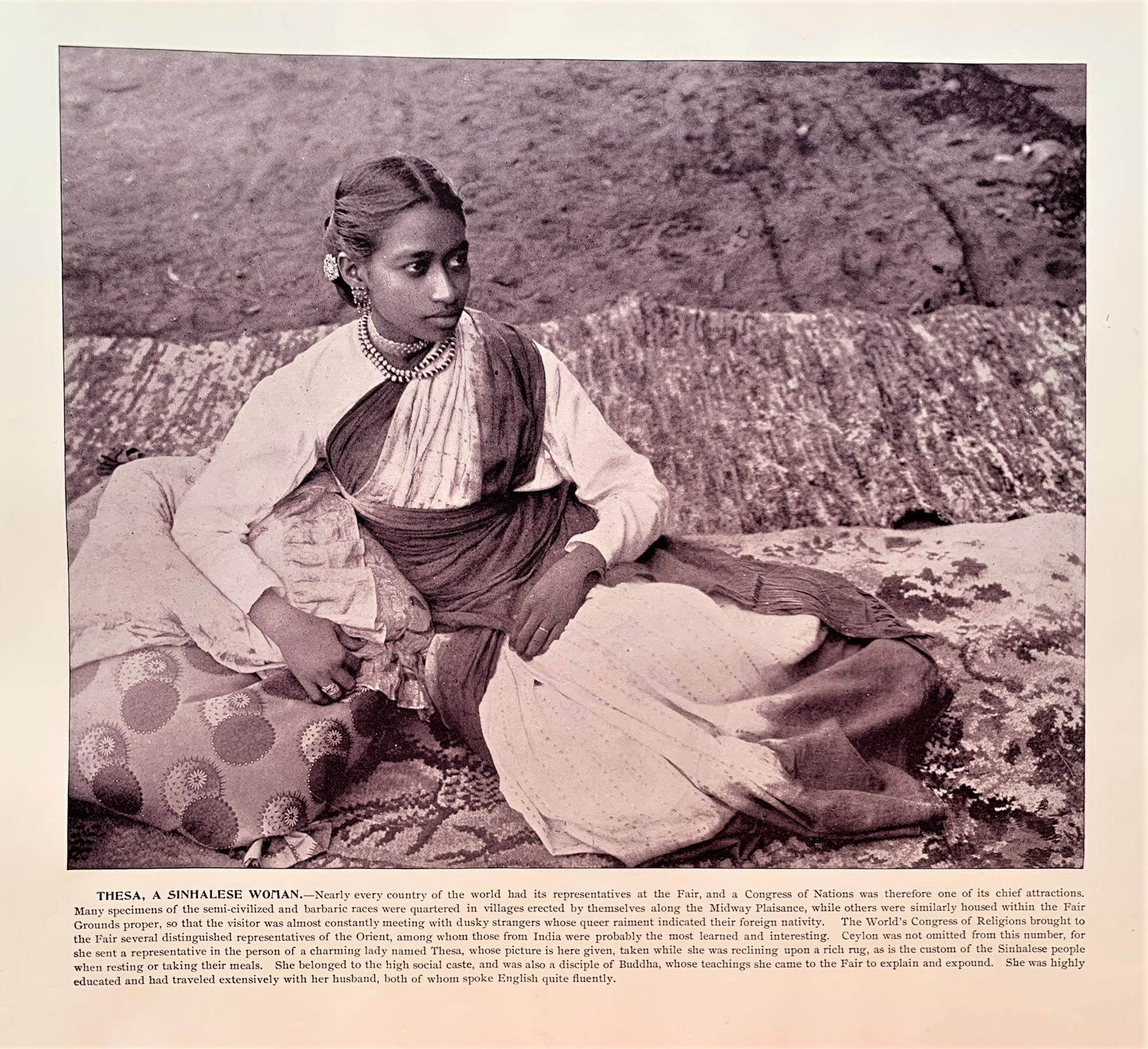
Thesa, a Sinhalese representative at the 1893 World's Columbian Exposition

Sri Lankans started arriving in the U.S. in larger numbers around the mid 1950s, but there is evidence from U.S. census records which proves that Sri Lankans first emigrated from Ceylon and arrived in the United States in earlier years, mostly between the 1880s and the 1890s.

In 1975, Sri Lankan immigrants were classified as belonging to a category which was separate from "other Asian" for the first time. In that year, 432 Sri Lankans entered the United States.

According to the U.S. Immigration and Naturalization Service's records, in 1996, 1,277 Sri Lankans were naturalized. This included 615 who had arrived in 1995 and 254 who had arrived in 1994, compared with only 68 arrivals in 1993 and 17 before 1985.

The number increased to 14,448 in the 1990s in conjunction with the Sri Lankan Civil War . An estimated 40% of Sri Lankan Americans are Sri Lankan Tamils. Sri Lankan Americans settled largely in cities.

== Demographics ==
Historical population
Year	Pop.	±%
1980	5,576	—
1990	14,022	+151.5%
2000	25,263	+80.2%
2017	49,116	+94.4%

The New York City Metropolitan Area, including New York City, Long Island, and Central New Jersey, contains the largest Sri Lankan community in the United States, receiving the highest legal permanent resident Sri Lankan immigrant population, followed by the Los Angeles metropolitan area. California has the highest number of Sri Lankans of any U.S. state at 14,008. Meanwhile, Maryland has the highest share of Sri Lankans at 0.07%.

Little Sri Lanka, in the Tompkinsville neighborhood of Staten Island, New York, is one of the largest Sri Lankan communities outside of the country of Sri Lanka itself. As of 2019, Sri Lankans were coalescing there. Staten Island alone has been estimated as home to more than 5,000 Sri Lankan Americans. Other communities with Sri Lankans include Queens, New York; Garden City Park, New York; Sewaren, New Jersey; Gaithersburg, Maryland; Kensington, Maryland; and Fishers, Indiana. In Los Angeles there is a large presence in the West San Fernando Valley, in particular in Reseda and Tarzana. According to the Statistical Atlas there are over 1,000 individuals with Sri Lankan ancestry in the West San Fernando Valley.

Around 40% of Sri Lankan Americans were born in the United States, while only a half are U.S. citizens.

The Top 10 cities with the most residents reporting Sri Lankan ancestry or origin are as follows:

City	Sri Lankan Population	City's Population	Sri Lankan Percentage
New York, New York	5,763	8,736,047	0.066%
Los Angeles, California	2,330	3,902,440	0.060%
Houston, Texas	841	2,293,288	0.037%
Fishers, Indiana	553	97154	0.569%
Oakland, California	531	437,548	0.121%
Chicago, Illinois	461	2,742,119	0.017%
Austin, Texas	453	944,658	0.048%
Gaithersburg, Maryland	451	68,827	0.655%
Dallas, Texas	446	1,300,239	0.034%
San Francisco, California	445	865,933	0.051%

== Socioeconomics ==
Sri Lankan Americans are generally educated and affluent. With a median income of $74,000, Sri Lankan Americans are the third most successful Asian American group (tied with Japanese Americans) in regards to income. Additionally, 57% of Sri Lankan Americans over the age of 25 have a bachelor's degree or more.

== Organizations ==
- Association of Sri Lankans in America (AHRCL)
- Friends of Sri Lanka in the United States
- Sri Lanka America Association of Southern California (SLAASC)
- Sri Lanka Association of New England (SLANE)
- Sri Lanka Foundation
- Sri Lankan American Association of Houston
- Sri Lankan American Cultural Association (SLACA)
- Sri Lankan Youth Organization (SLYO)
- The Association of Sri Lankan Muslims in North America (TASMiNA)

== See also ==
- Minnesota Buddhist Vihara
- Mahamevnawa Buddhist Meditation Center of New York
- American Chamber of Commerce in Sri Lanka
- Asian Americans
- Sri Lankan diaspora
- Sri Lanka–United States relations
