= List of Indian Americans =

Indian Americans are citizens or residents of the United States of America who trace their family descent to India. Notable Indian Americans include:

== Academics ==
=== Nobel Prize recipients ===
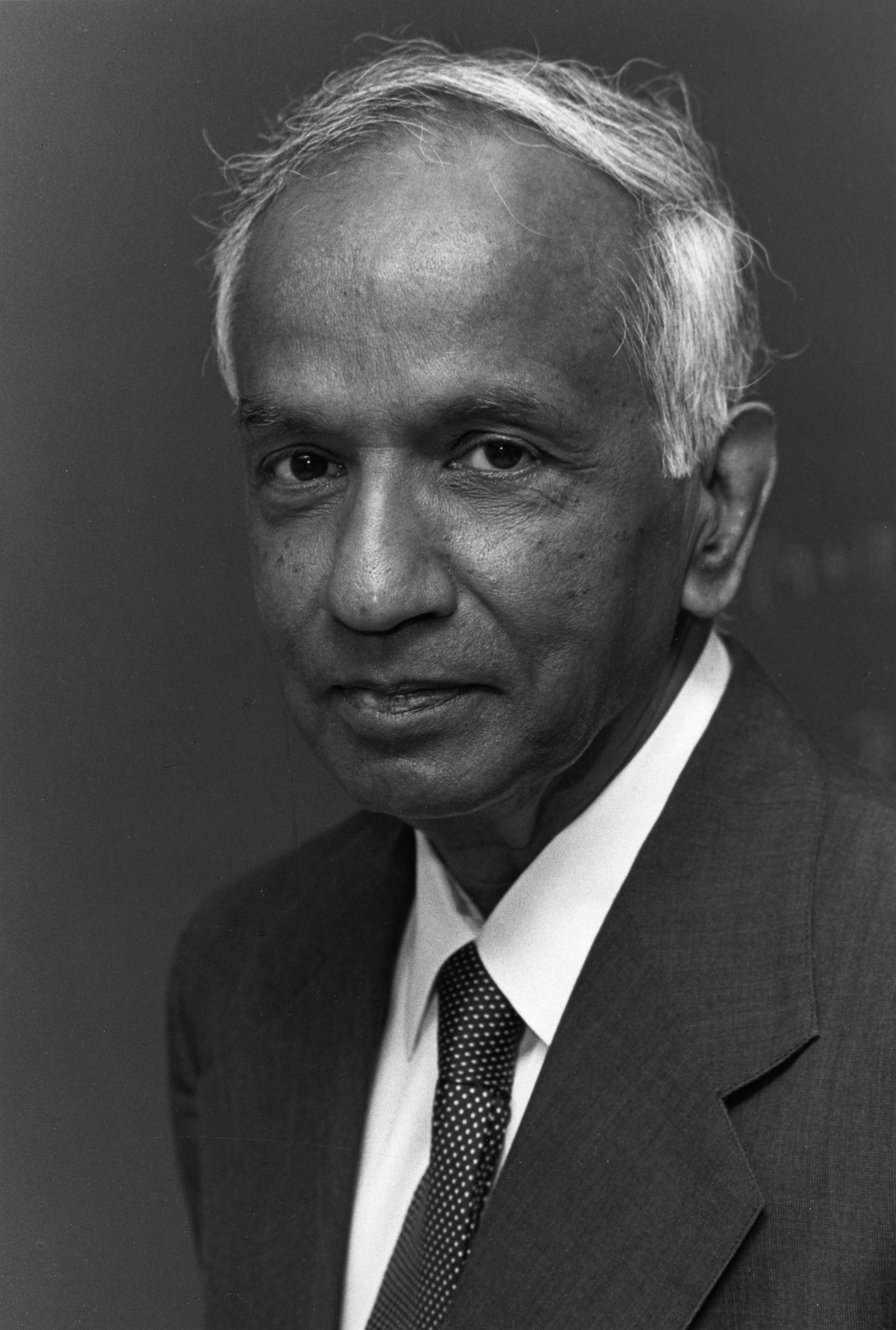
Subramanyan Chandrasekhar, Nobel Prize for Physics, 1983

- Har Gobind Khorana (1922–2011), Nobel Prize in Medicine, 1968
- Subramanyan Chandrasekhar (1910–1995), Nobel Prize for Physics, 1983
- Venkatraman Ramakrishnan (b. 1952), Nobel Prize in Chemistry, 2009; Former President of the Royal Society, (2015–2020)
- Abhijit Banerjee (b. 1961), Nobel Memorial Prize in Economic Sciences, 2019; Ford Foundation International Professor of Economics at Massachusetts Institute of Technology

=== Deans and presidents ===
- Rakesh Khurana (born 1967), former dean of Harvard College
- Neeli Bendapudi (born 1962), president of University of Louisville
- Jamshed Bharucha (born 1956), former president of Cooper Union, (2011–2015); former dean of arts & sciences at Dartmouth College and former provost at Tufts University
- Vijay K. Dhir (born 1943), former dean of the University of California, Los Angeles Henry Samueli School of Engineering and Applied Science, (2003–2016)
- Ravi V. Bellamkonda (born 1968), Vinik Dean of Engineering at Duke University Edmund T. Pratt Jr. School of Engineering
- Dinesh D'Souza (born 1961), former president of The King's College, New York, (2010–2012)
- Anjli Jain (born 1981), executive director of Campus Consortium
- Dipak C. Jain (born 1957), former dean of INSEAD, (2011–2013); former dean of the Kellogg School of Management at Northwestern University, (2001–2009)
- Vistasp Karbhari, former president of the University of Texas at Arlington, (2013–2020)
- Pramod Khargonekar (born 1956), control theorist; vice chancellor of research at University of California, Irvine; former dean, College of Engineering at University of Florida, Gainesville, (2001–2009)
- Renu Khator (born 1958), chancellor of the University of Houston System and president of the University of Houston; former provost and senior vice president, University of South Florida
- Pradeep Khosla (born 1957), chancellor of the University of California, San Diego
- Sanjeev Kulkarni (born 1963), former Dean of the Graduate School (2014-2017) and Dean of the Faculty (2017-2021) of Princeton University
- Sunil Kumar (academic administrator), president of Tufts University,
- Vijay Kumar (born 1962), dean of the School of Engineering and Applied Science at the University of Pennsylvania
- Saira Rao, former Colorado congressional candidate and activist
- Geeta Menon, dean emeritus of the undergraduate college at New York University Stern School of Business
- Nitin Nohria (born 1962), former dean of Harvard Business School, (2010–2020)
- Sethuraman Panchanathan, director of National Science Foundation and former executive vice president and chief research and innovation officer at Arizona State University
- Michael Rao, president of Virginia Commonwealth University
- S. Narasinga Rao, former dean of Jackson College of Graduate Studies and Research at the University of Central Oklahoma
- Beheruz Sethna, president of the University of West Georgia
- Paul Shrivastava, chief sustainability officer and director, Sustainability Institute, Pennsylvania State University
- Molly Easo Smith, former president of Manhattanville College
- Kumble R. Subbaswamy, former chancellor of the University of Massachusetts Amherst
- Subra Suresh, president of Carnegie Mellon University
- Satish K. Tripathi, president of University at Buffalo
- Sundaraja Sitharama Iyengar, Ryder Professor of Computer Science and director of the School of Computing and Information Sciences at Florida International University, Miami
- S. Shankar Sastry, former dean of the UC Berkeley College of Engineering
- Bala V. Balachandran (born 1937), professor emeritus at Kellogg School of Management at Northwestern University; founder, dean and chairman of Great Lakes Institute of Management and executive professor & strategy adviser to the dean of the Bauer College of Business at University of Houston
- Nagi Naganathan, president of Oregon Institute of Technology and former president and dean of the College of Engineering at the University of Toledo, (2001–2016)
- Sri Zaheer, former dean of Carlson School of Management at the University of Minnesota
- Vallabh Sambamurthy, Dean of the Wisconsin School of Business at the University of Wisconsin–Madison
- Naureen Hassan, American finance executive who serves as the president of UBS Americas; previously served as the first vice president and chief operating officer of the Federal Reserve Bank of New York

=== Mathematicians ===
- Raj Chandra Bose (1901–1987), mathematician
- Shamit Kachru (b. 1970), Mathematical Physicist, professor at Stanford Institute for Theoretical Physics
- Akshay Venkatesh (b. 1981), Fields Medal laureate, mathematician
- Shreeram Shankar Abhyankar (1930–2012), mathematician, singularity theory and Abhyankar's conjecture of finite group theory
- Raghu Raj Bahadur (1924–1997), statistician
- Manjul Bhargava (b. 1974), professor of mathematics at Princeton University and winner of Fields Medal, 2014
- Rahul Pandharipande (b. 1969), joined as Professor of Mathematics at Princeton University in 2002, he accepted a Professorship at ETH Zürich
- Sarvadaman Chowla (1907–1995), mathematician specializing in number theory
- Harish-Chandra (1923–1983), mathematician, IBM Von Neumann Professor at Institute for Advanced Study, Princeton
- Narendra Karmarkar (b. 1955), mathematician, inventor of Karmarkar algorithm
- Chandrashekhar Khare (b. 1968), professor of mathematics at the University of California, Los Angeles
- G. S. Maddala (1933–1999), mathematician and economist best known for work in the field of econometrics
- Anil Nerode (b. 1932), mathematician, proved the Myhill-Nerode Theorem
- Ria Persad (b. 1974), mathematician, classical musician, and model
- K. C. Sreedharan Pillai (1920–1985), mathematician
- Calyampudi Radhakrishna Rao (1920–2023), professor at Penn State University and research professor at the University at Buffalo
- Radha Laha (1930–1999), probabilist, statistician, and mathematician
- S. R. Srinivasa Varadhan (b. 1940), New York University mathematician who specialised in probability; winner of the Abel Prize and Steele Prize
- DJ Patil (b. 1974), mathematician & Data scientist
- Sucharit Sarkar (b. 1983), mathematician and topologist
- Sourav Chatterjee (b. 1979), statistician, mathematician and professor at Stanford
- Kannan Soundararajan (b. 1973), mathematician, professor at Stanford and IMO medalist.
- Subhash Khot (b. 1978), mathematician, theoretical computer scientist famous for Unique games conjecture.
- Sanjeev Arora (b. 1968), mathematician, theoretical computer scientist and Gödel Prize winner.
- Kiran Kedlaya (b. 1974), mathematician
- Davender Singh Malik (1958–2025), mathematician
- N. U. Prabhu, mathematician

=== Economists ===
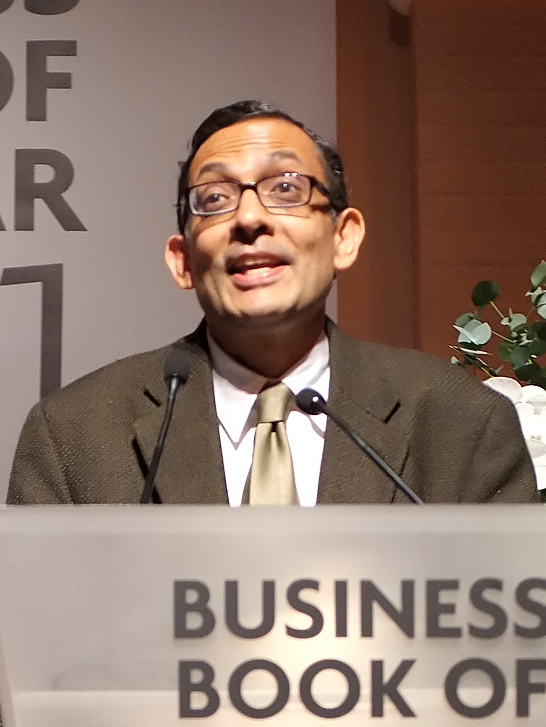
Abhijit Banerjee, Professor of Economics at Massachusetts Institute of Technology, Nobel Prize winner in Economic Sciences in 2019.

- Abhijit Banerjee (b. 1961), Ford Foundation international professor of economics at Massachusetts Institute of Technology, and Nobel Laureate in Economic Sciences 2019.
- Pranab Bardhan (b. 1939), professor emeritus of Economics University of California, Berkeley
- Kaushik Basu (b. 1952), C. Marks Professor of International Studies and Professor of Economics Cornell University
- Jagdish Natwarlal Bhagwati (b. 1934), professor of economics at Columbia University
- Alok Bhargava (b. 1954), professor of economics at the University of Maryland School of Public Policy
- V. V. Chari (b. 1952), professor of economics at the University of Minnesota
- Raj Chetty (b. 1979), professor of economics at Harvard University
- Srikant Datar, The 11th Dean of Harvard Business School, took charge from January 1, 2021
- Avinash Kamalakar Dixit (b. 1944), professor of economics at Princeton University
- Gita Gopinath (b. 1971), chief economist at the International Monetary Fund and Economic Adviser to the Chief Minister of Kerala
- Reema Harrysingh-Carmona (b. 1970), economist and the 5th First Lady of Trinidad and Tobago
- Sendhil Mullainathan (b. 1973), professor of economics, Harvard University
- Arvind Panagariya (b. 1952), professor of economics at Columbia University
- Debraj Ray (b. 1957), Silver Professor of Economics, New York University
- Ruchir Sharma, chief global strategist of asset management and emerging markets equity, Morgan Stanley Investment Management
- Arvind Subramanian (b. 1959), Chief Economic Advisor Government of India and formerly an economist at the International Monetary Fund

=== Professors and scholars in computer science or engineering and electrical engineering ===
- Amit Sahai (b.1974), professor of computer science at University of California, Los Angeles, fellow of Association for Computing Machinery,
- Amit Sheth, computer scientist at Wright State University in Dayton, Ohio
- Anant Agarwal, professor of electrical engineering and director of the Computer Science and Artificial Intelligence Laboratory at Massachusetts Institute of Technology
- Aravind Joshi (1929–2017), professor of computer and cognitive science at the University of Pennsylvania
- Arvind, Johnson Professor of Computer Science and Engineering at the Massachusetts Institute of Technology
- Arogyaswami Paulraj (b. 1944), professor of electrical engineering at Stanford University
- Ashwin Ram (b. 1960), head of artificial intelligence Amazon Alexa
- Avinash Kak (b. 1944), professor of electrical and computer engineering at Purdue University
- B. Jayant Baliga (b. 1948), inventor of the Insulated-gate bipolar transistor
- Bhubaneswar Mishra (b. 1961), professor of computer science, engineering & mathematics at Courant Institute of Mathematical Sciences of New York University and visiting scholar at Cold Spring Harbor Laboratory.
- Chandra Kintala (1948–2009), former Vice President Bell Labs
- Gopal H. Gaonkar (b. 1936), a professor of engineering at Florida Atlantic University
- Hari Balakrishnan, Fujitsu Chair Professor in the Department of Electrical Engineering and Computer Science at Massachusetts Institute of Technology
- K. Mani Chandy, professor of computer science at the California Institute of Technology
- Krishna Saraswat, professor of electrical engineering at Stanford University
- Madhu Sudan, professor of computer science at Harvard University
- Prabhat Mishra, professor of computer science and engineering at University of Florida
- Raj Jain, professor of computer science and engineering at Washington University School of Engineering and Applied Science
- Rangasami L. Kashyap (b. 1938), professor of electrical engineering at Purdue University
- Ricky J. Sethi, professor of computer science at Fitchburg State University; director of Research at The Madsci Network
- Sanjeev R. Kulkarni, William R. Kenan, Jr., Professor of Electrical and Computer Engineering and Professor of Operations Research and Financial Engineering at Princeton University
- Saraju Mohanty, professor of computer science and engineering at the University of North Texas
- Shree K. Nayar, professor of computer science at Columbia University
- Shrikanth Narayanan, award-winning researcher, inventor and educator at University of Southern California
- Shwetak Patel, professor of computer science and electrical engineering at the University of Washington
- Supriyo Datta, Thomas Duncan Distinguished Professor of Electrical and Computer Engineering at the Purdue University
- Thomas Kailath, professor of engineering at Stanford University
- Vijay Vazirani (b. 1957), professor of computer science at University of California, Irvine
- Unnikrishna Pillai, Professor of Electrical and Computer Engineering at New York University
- Suman Datta (b. 1973), professor of electrical engineering at the University of Notre Dame, Fellow of the Institute of Electrical and Electronics Engineers and the Stinson Professor of Nanotechnology at the University of Notre Dame

=== Professors and scholars in other disciplines ===
- Avantika Bawa, Professor of Fine Art, Washington State University, Vancouver, Washington.
- Arun Rai, Regents' Professor of the University System of Georgia and Howard S. Starks Distinguished Chair, Georgia State University
- Amishi Jha, American neuroscientist and professor of psychology
- Kuzhikalail M. Abraham, professor at Northeastern University, electrochemistry; materials science; lithium, lithium ion, and lithium air batteries
- Mrinal K. Sen, John A. and Katherine G. Jackson Chair in Applied Seismology at Jackson School of Geosciences, University of Texas at Austin.
- Nita Ahuja, Chief of Surgical Oncology at Johns Hopkins Hospital, surgeon-scientist, first women ever to lead this department at Johns Hopkins Hospital.
- Pulickel M. Ajayan, professor of material science at Rice University
- Salman Akhtar, professor at the Jefferson Medical College
- Muzaffar Alam, professor in South Asian Languages & Civilizations at the University of Chicago
- Akhil Amar, professor of law at Yale Law School
- Vikram Amar, professor of law at the University of California, Davis School of Law
- Abhay Ashtekar, professor of physics and Director of the Institute for Gravitational Physics and Geometry at Pennsylvania State University
- Satya N. Atluri, Presidential Chair and University Distinguished Professor Texas Tech University, Recipient, Padma Bhushan in Science and Engineering in 2013 from the President of India
- Geeta Menon, Abraham Krasnoff Professor of Global Business and current chair of the Marketing Department at New York University Stern School of Business
- P.S. Ayyaswamy, professor of dynamical engineering at the University of Pennsylvania
- Homi K. Bhabha, Anne F. Rothenberg Professor of English and American Literature and Language, and the Director of the Mahindra Humanities Center at Harvard University
- Margaret Abraham, professor of sociology at Hofstra University; served as the 18th president (2014–2018) of the International Sociological Association
- Mahzarin Banaji, professor at Harvard University, best known for exploring implicit racial and gender biases
- Nalini Ambady, professor of psychology and social psychologist
- Sugata Bose, professor of history at Harvard University
- Ananda Mohan Chakrabarty, professor of microbiology at University of Illinois at Chicago
- Arup Chakraborty, Robert T. Haslam Professor focusing in biophysics, computational modeling and infectious disease at Massachusetts Institute of Technology
- Naresh Dalal, Dirac Professor of Chemistry and Biochemistry at Florida State University
- Aswath Damodaran, professor of finance at the Stern School of Business at New York University
- Ashok Das, professor of physics at the University of Rochester
- Ashok Gadgil, professor of civil and environmental engineering at the University of California, Berkeley
- Rajit Gadh, professor of mechanical and aerospace engineering at University of California, Los Angeles
- Akhilesh K. Gaharwar, professor in the Department of Biomedical Engineering at Texas A&M University
- Atul Gawande, professor in the Department of Health Policy & Management at Harvard T.H. Chan School of Public Health
- Anirvan Ghosh, professor at the University of California, San Diego
- Radhika Govindrajan, associate professor of anthropology at University of Washington
- Vijay Govindarajan, Coxe Distinguished Professor at Dartmouth College's Tuck School of Business and the Marvin Bower Fellow at Harvard Business School
- Kausalya Hart, scholar of Tamil language at University of California, Berkeley
- Narayan Hosmane, professor of chemistry and biochemistry at Northern Illinois University
- Ashish Jha, former dean of Brown University School of Public Health
- Ravi Jagannathan, professor at the Kellogg School of Management
- Jainendra K. Jain, professor of physics at Pennsylvania State University
- Piyare Jain, professor emeritus at University at Buffalo
- Prema Kurien, professor of sociology at the Maxwell School of Citizenship and Public Affairs of Syracuse University
- Rakesh Jain, professor of tumor biology at Massachusetts General Hospital in the Harvard Medical School
- S. Lochlann Jain, associate professor in the Anthropology Department at Stanford University
- Sachin H. Jain, physician and health policy analyst at Harvard Medical School
- Nazir Jairazbhoy, professor of folk and classical music of South Asia at University of California, Los Angeles
- Yogesh Jaluria, Board of Governors Professor and Distinguished Professor at Rutgers, the State University of New Jersey, in the Department of Mechanical and Aerospace Engineering.
- M. A. Muqtedar Khan, Professor in the Department of Political Science and International Relations at the University of Delaware
- Ravindra Khattree, professor of statistics at Oakland University
- Satish Nagarajaiah, professor of civil engineering and of mechanical engineering at Rice University.
- S. P. Kothari, Gordon Y Billard Professor of Management at MIT Sloan School of Management
- Shrinivas Kulkarni, professor of astrophysics and planetary science at California Institute of Technology
- Subodha Kumar, Professor, Fox School of Business and Management, Temple University
- Vijay Mahajan (academic), John P. Harbin Centennial Chair in Business and Professor of Marketing at University of Texas at Austin
- Raj Mittra, electrical engineering professor at Pennsylvania State University
- Jagadeesh Moodera, American physicist of Indian origin; senior research scientist at Massachusetts Institute of Technology's Francis Bitter Magnet Laboratory
- Bharati Mukherjee, author, professor in the department of English at the University of California, Berkeley
- C. M. Naim, scholar of Urdu language and literature at the University of Chicago
- V. Parmeswaran Nair, Physicist, currently a Distinguished Professor at City University of New York.
- Shrikanth Narayanan, award-winning researcher, inventor and educator at University of Southern California
- Jaishree Odin, professor, postmodern literary theorist at the University of Hawaiʻi
- C.K. Prahalad, professor of corporate strategy at the Stephen M. Ross School of Business in the University of Michigan
- Vijay Prashad, professor of international studies at Trinity College
- Vilayanur S. Ramachandran, behavioral neurologist and psychophysicist; Professor with the Psychology and Neurosciences University of California, San Diego
- A. Hari Reddi, distinguished professor and Lawrence J. Ellison Endowed Chair in Musculoskeletal Molecular Biology at the University of California, Davis
- J. N. Reddy, professor and holder of the Oscar S. Wyatt Endowed Chair in Mechanical Engineering at Texas A&M University
- Anantanand Rambachan, professor of religion at St. Olaf College, Minnesota, United States
- K. R. Rao, professor at University of Texas at Arlington
- Subrata Roy, professor of aerospace engineering at the University of Florida
- Subir Sachdev, Herchel Smith Professor of Physics at Harvard University; Dirac Medal and National Academy of Sciences
- Nitin Samarth, Head and Professor of Physics, Pennsylvania State University
- Dinesh Sharma
- Jagdish Sheth, professor of marketing at Goizueta Business School of Emory University
- Jagdish Shukla, professor at George Mason University
- Gayatri Chakravorty Spivak, professor at Columbia University
- Marti G. Subrahmanyam, professor of finance at the Stern School of Business at New York University
- Sanjay Subrahmanyam, holder of Navin and Pratima Doshi Chair of Indian History and scholar at University of California, Los Angeles
- Mriganka Sur, professor of neuroscience at the Massachusetts Institute of Technology
- Medha Yodh, scholar of classical Indian dance at University of California, Los Angeles
- Venkatesh Shankar, Brierley Endowed Professor of Marketing, Department Chair, and Academic Director of Brierley Institute for Customer Engagement, Southern Methodist University

== Activism and philanthropy ==
- Rajiv Malhotra, Hindutva activist for promoting Indic cultures, author of Breaking India and the founder of Infinity Foundation
- Maya Ajmera, founder of The Global Fund for Children and author of more than 20 books for children
- Kala Bagai, immigrant advocate and one of the first South Asian women in the United States
- Vaishno Das Bagai, Ghadar party member, associated with the struggle for U.S. citizenship
- Bhairavi Desai, founding member of the Taxi Workers Alliance in New York
- Kartar Dhillon, Ghadar Party, labor, and civil rights activist
- Mallika Dutt, executive director of Breakthrough human rights organization
- Vijaya Lakshmi Emani (1958–2009), social activist
- Arun Manilal Gandhi, fifth grandson of Mohandas Gandhi
- Meera Gandhi, founder and CEO of The Giving Back Foundation
- Abraham George, philanthropist humanitarian, founder of The George Foundation (TGF)
- Gitanjali S. Gutierrez, lawyer who is defending Guantanamo prisoners
- Maya Harris, of half Indian descent, executive director of the ACLU of Northern California and sister of Kamala Harris
- Prerna Lal, immigrant rights advocate and attorney
- Hemant Mehta - atheist activist, YouTuber and writer
- Girindra Mukerji, leader of one of the first Indian-American student protests against colonialism in 1908
- Kavita Ramdas, president and CEO of Global Fund for Women
- Dinesh Sharma, leader, CRO and Director at Steam Works Studio and author in human development, human rights and global education, and professor at Fordham, New York University, and Walden University
- Inder Singh, chairman of the Global Organization of People of Indian Origin (GOPIO)
- Bhagat Singh Thind, civil rights activist who defended the right of Indian immigrants to gain United States citizenship in United States v. Bhagat Singh Thind
- Urvashi Vaid, gay rights activist
- Thomas Abraham (b. 1948), founder president of the Global Organization of People of Indian Origin (GOPIO) as well as the National Federation of Indian American Associations (NFIA)
- Sakharam Ganesh Pandit (1875–1959), lawyer who argued against government efforts to revoke American citizenship for Indian emigrants
- Surendran Pattel, lawyer who is a judge for the 240th Texas District Court in Fort Bend County since 2023

== Arts, media, and entertainment ==
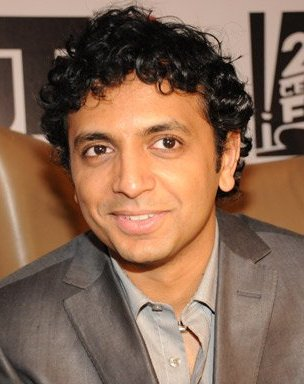
M. Night Shyamalan, Hollywood director

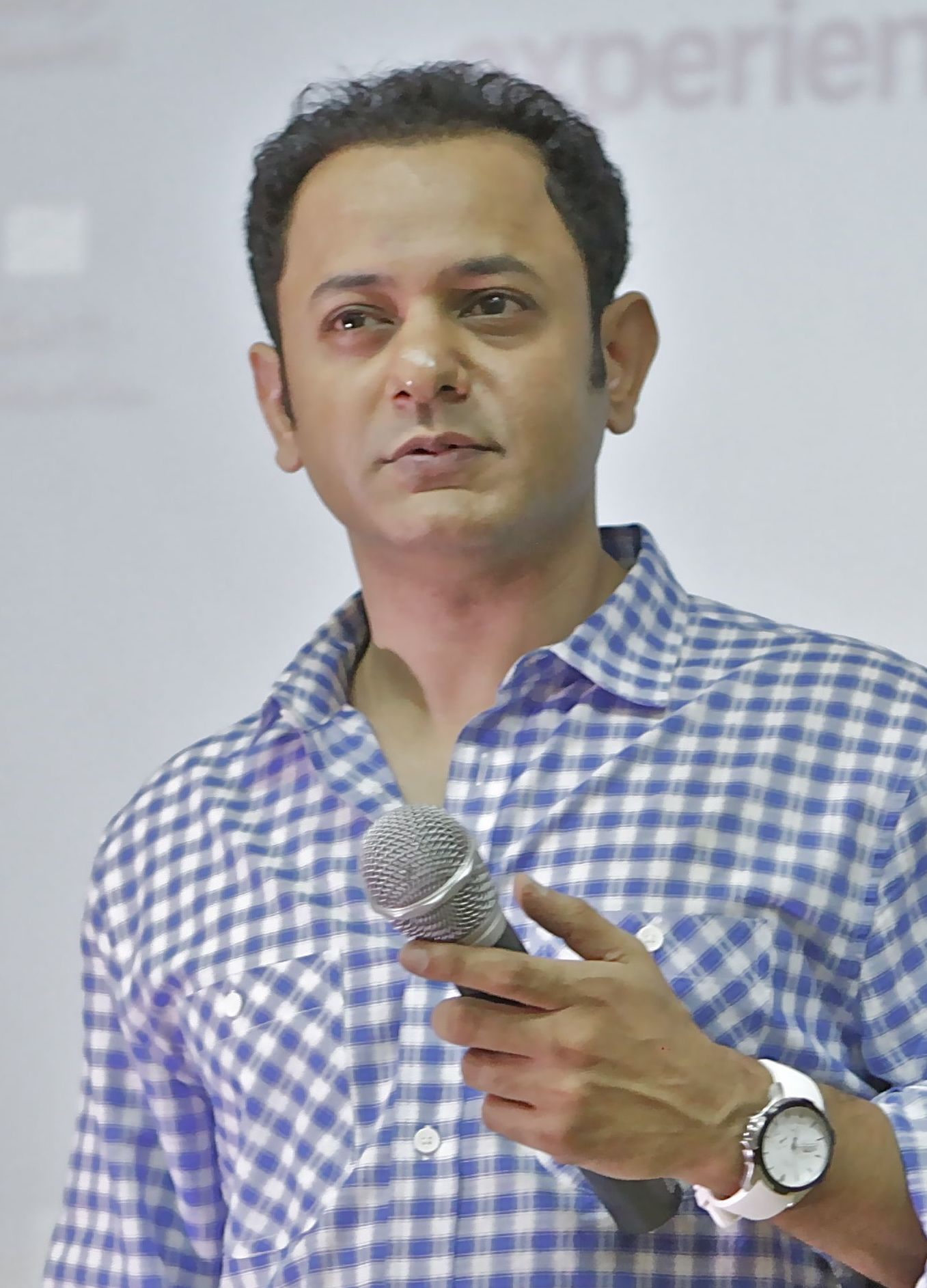
Rohit Gupta, director, producer

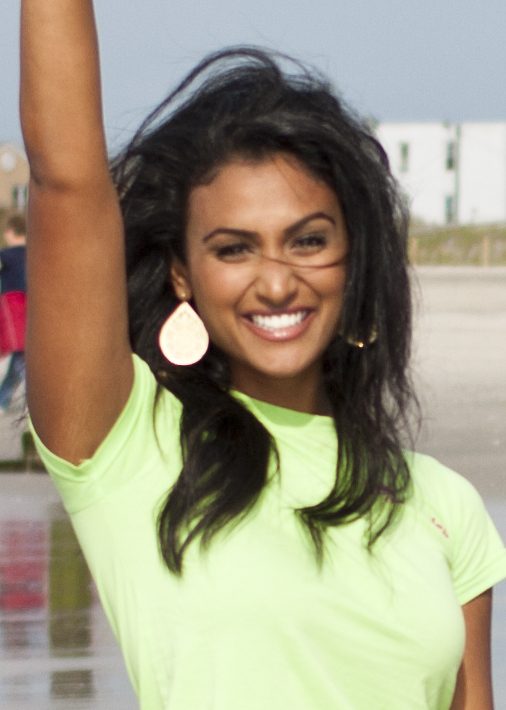
Nina Davuluri, Miss America 2014

- Ashok Amritraj, Hollywood film producer
- Alok Vaid-Menon, writer, performance artist, media personality
- Salma Arastu, artist
- San Banarje, independent filmmaker
- Rina Banerjee, artist
- Prashant Bhargava, director
- Niala Boodhoo, journalist, host, and executive producer
- Lesley-Ann Brandt, actress
- Jay Chandrasekhar, director, actor, comedian, and writer
- Shanthi Chandrasekar, visual artist
- Aneesh Chaganty, film director, screenwriter
- Sabu Dastagir, actor
- Nina Davuluri, Miss America 2014
- India de Beaufort, actress
- Sharad Devarajan, superhero creator, producer, writer
- Param Gill, director, screenwriter and producer
- Kovid Gupta, bestselling author and screenwriter
- RK DreamWest, film director, screenwriter, cinematographer
- Reef Karim, actor, director, writer, and producer
- Neeraj Khemlani, producer for CBS News' 60 Minutes
- Bharti Kirchner, writer
- Shirish Korde, artist
- Adam Bhala Lough, director, screenwriter
- Tirlok Malik, filmmaker and actor
- Dharminder Mann, entrepreneur, film producer and YouTuber.
- Benny Mathews, film and music video director
- Faris McReynolds, painter and musician
- Meera Menon, director, writer, and editor
- Mira Nair, director and producer
- Sunil Nayar, TV writer and producer; producer of CSI: Miami
- Oopali Operajita, choreographer and Odissi and Bharatanatyam artiste; Distinguished Fellow, Carnegie Mellon University
- Yatin Patel, photographer and artist
- Mythili Prakash, Bharatanatyam dancer and choreographer
- Asha Puthli, singer-songwriter, producer and actress
- Sarayu Rao, actor and director
- Harish Saluja, filmmaker
- Stephanie Sengupta, producer and writer
- Mehul Shah, actor, director, writer, and producer
- Adi Shankar, producer and actor
- Naren Shankar, TV writer, producer and director; an executive producer of CSI: Crime Scene Investigation
- M. Night Shyamalan, director, filmmaker
- Ishana Night Shyamalan, filmmaker, screenwriter and producer
- Tarsem Singh, director
- Rohit Gupta, director, producer
- Manick Sorcar, animator, artist, and producer
- Babu Subramaniam, director
- Tina Sugandh, entertainer
- Julie Titus, model, contestant on America's Next Top Model
- Serena Varghese, voice actress
- Prashanth Venkataramanujam, television writer, actor, and producer
- Hasna Sal, glass sculptor, architect, artist and author

=== Actors and actresses ===
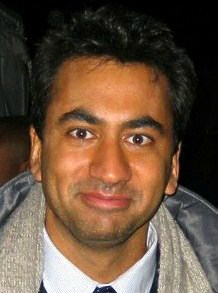
Kal Penn, actor

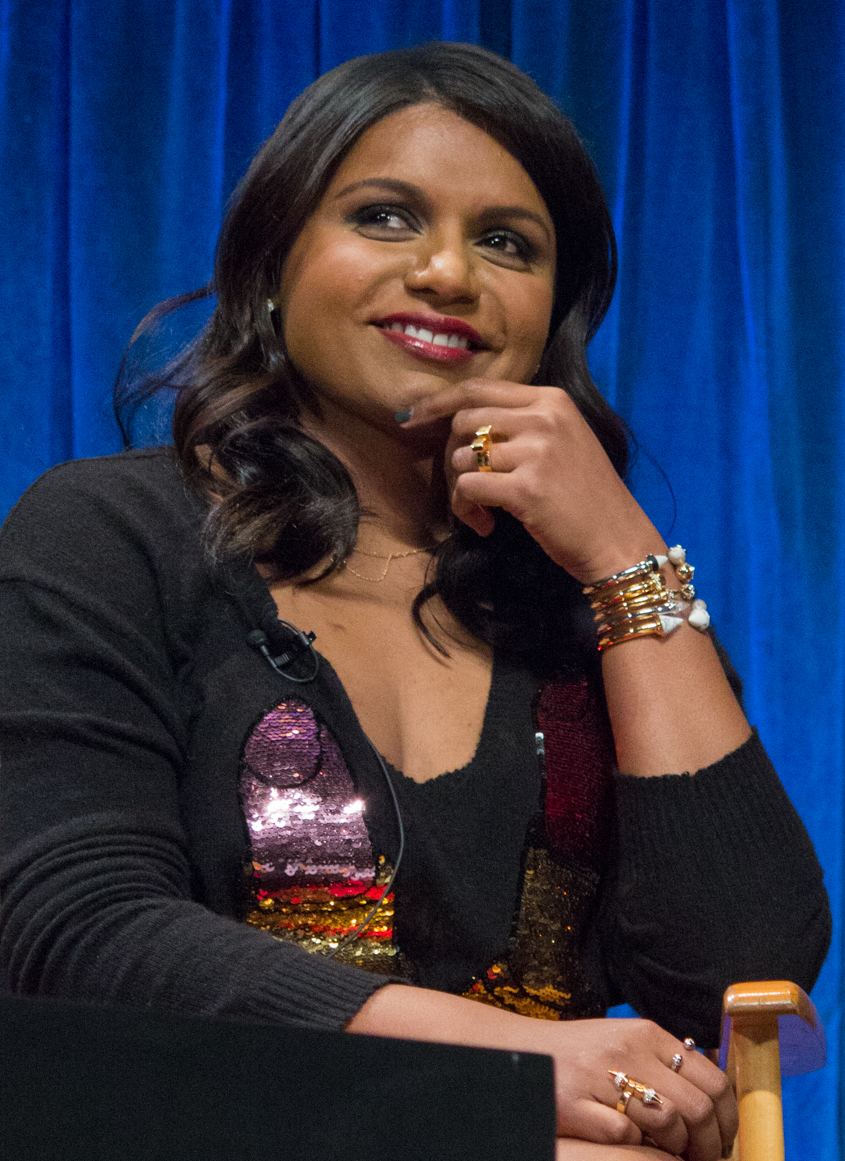
Mindy Kaling, actress

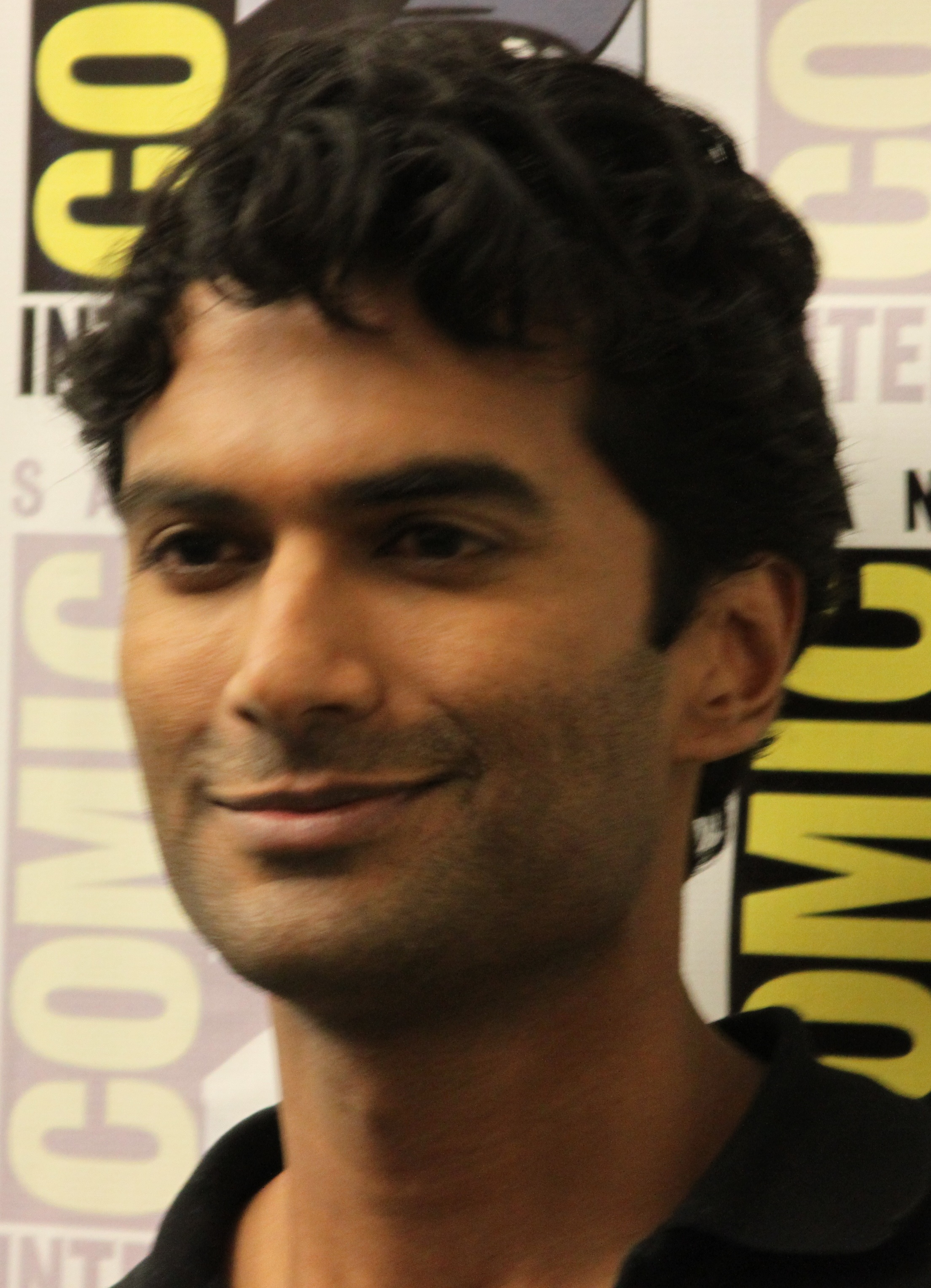
Sendhil Ramamurthy, actor

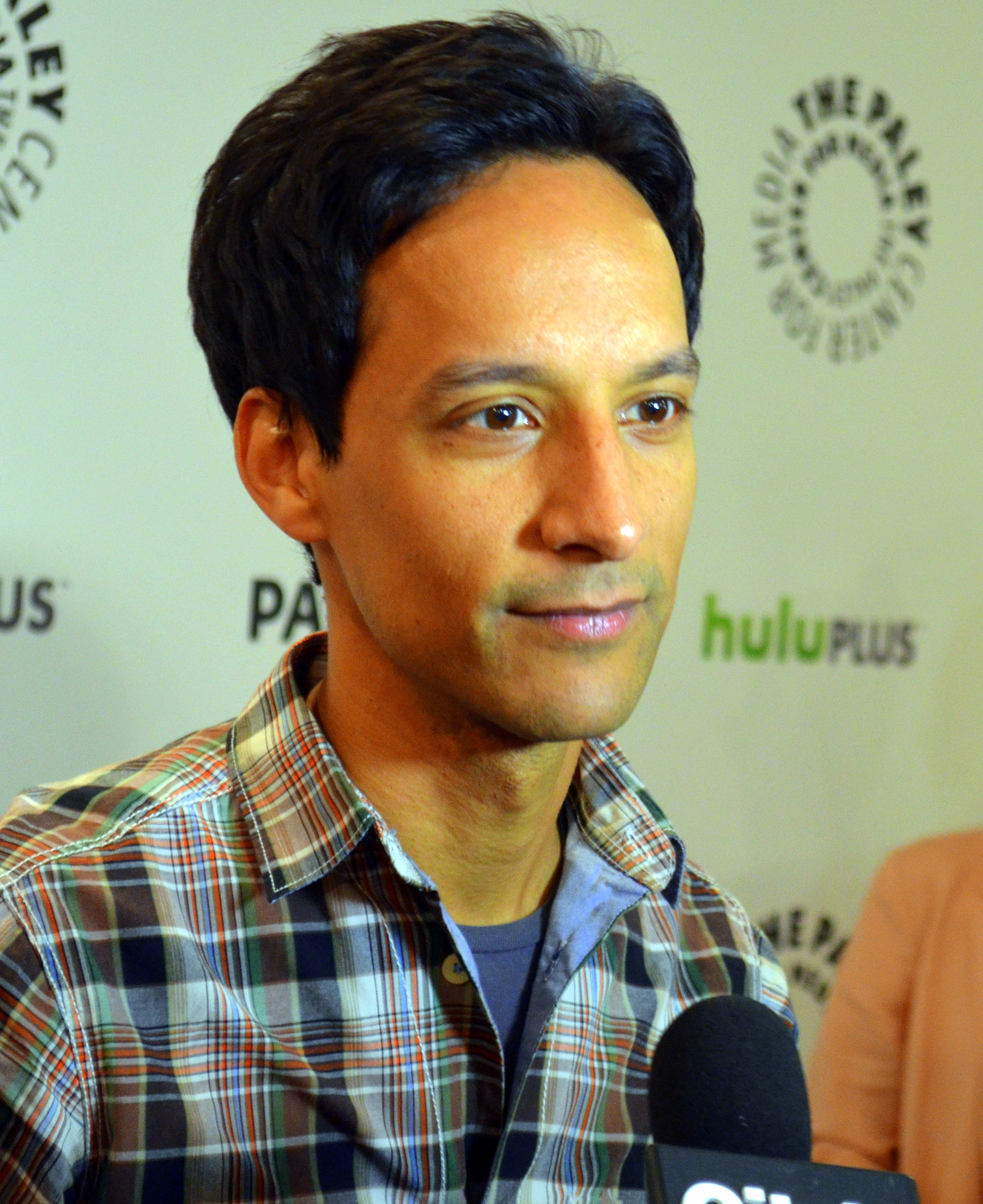
Danny Pudi, actor

- Karan Soni, actor
- Babu Antony, actor
- Utkarsh Ambudkar, actor
- Simran Judge, actor
- Ravi Patel, actor
- Devika Bhise, actress
- Naveen Andrews, actor
- Tatyana Ali, actress
- Waris Ahluwalia, fashion designer
- Aziz Ansari, actor and comedian
- Gabrielle Anwar, actress
- Erick Avari, actor
- Sunkrish Bala, actor
- Firdous Bamji, actor
- Purva Bedi, actress
- Anjali Bhimani, actress
- Summer Bishil, actress
- Karan Brar, film and TV actor
- Samrat Chakrabarti, actor
- Melanie Chandra, actress
- Michelle Khare, actress, YouTuber, and television host
- Sabu Dastagir, actor
- Sujata Day, actress
- Manish Dayal, actor
- Noureen DeWulf, actress
- Raja Fenske, actor
- Janina Gavankar, actress
- Jacob Gregory, actor
- Namrata Singh Gujral, actress
- Sakina Jaffrey, actress
- Anu Emmanuel, actress
- Poorna Jagannathan, actress and producer
- Avan Jogia, actor
- Avantika Vandanapu, actress and dancer. Known for her role in 2021 film, Spin
- Mindy Kaling, actress, writer, producer, comedian
- Ravi Kapoor, actor
- Rahul Kohli, actor
- Deep Katdare, actor
- Nivedita Kulkarni, actress
- Shishir Kurup, actor
- Akansha Ranjan Kapoor, actress
- Nakul Dev Mahajan, Bollywood dancer and choreographer
- Sunny Leone, actor and former pornographic actress
- Tirlok Malik, actor
- Shelley Malil, film and TV actor
- Rizwan Manji, actor
- Aasif Mandvi, actor
- Sunita Mani, actress
- Ajay Mehta, TV actor
- Ajay Naidu, actor
- Shoba Narayan, theatre actress and singer
- Anjul Nigam, actor
- Maulik Pancholy, actor
- Devika Parikh, actress
- Kal Penn, actor
- Danny Pudi, actor
- Ritesh Rajan, actor
- Sendhil Ramamurthy, actor
- Dileep Rao, actor
- Sarayu Rao, actor
- Navi Rawat, actress
- Sonal Shah, actress
- Sheetal Sheth, actress
- Zenobia Shroff, Indian-American actress and comedienne
- Tiya Sircar, actress
- Errol Sitahal, actor
- Megan Suri, actress
- Kapil Talwalkar, actor
- Omi Vaidya, actor
- Sugith Varughese, Indian-born Canadian actor with American citizenship
- Naren Weiss, actor and playwright
- Rayna Vallandingham, actress
- Annet Mahendru, actress
- Nitya Vidyasagar, actress
- Nandana Sen, actress
- Pooja Batra, actress
- Monica Dogra, actress
- Deepti Naval, actress

=== Comedians ===
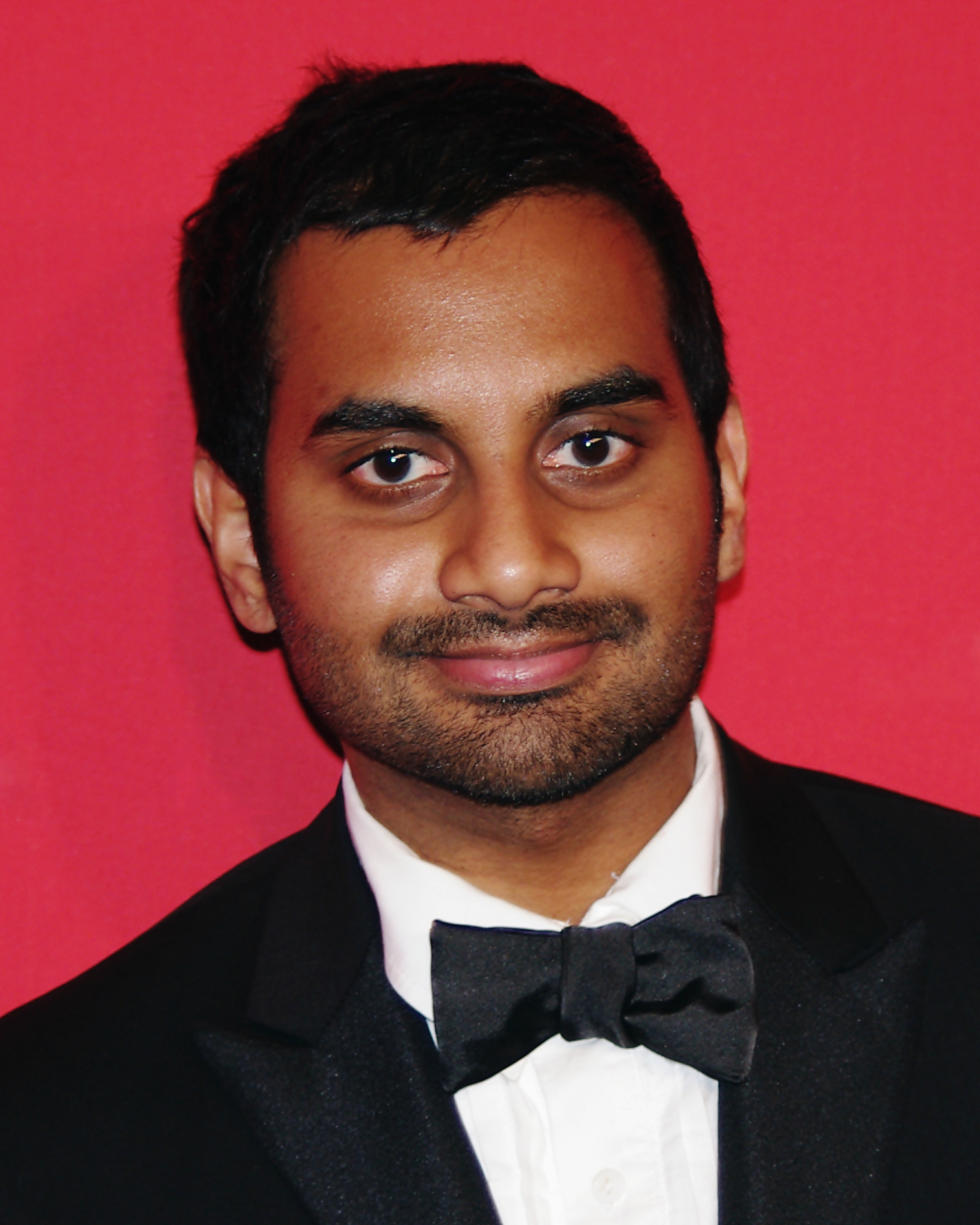
Aziz Ansari, comedian and actor

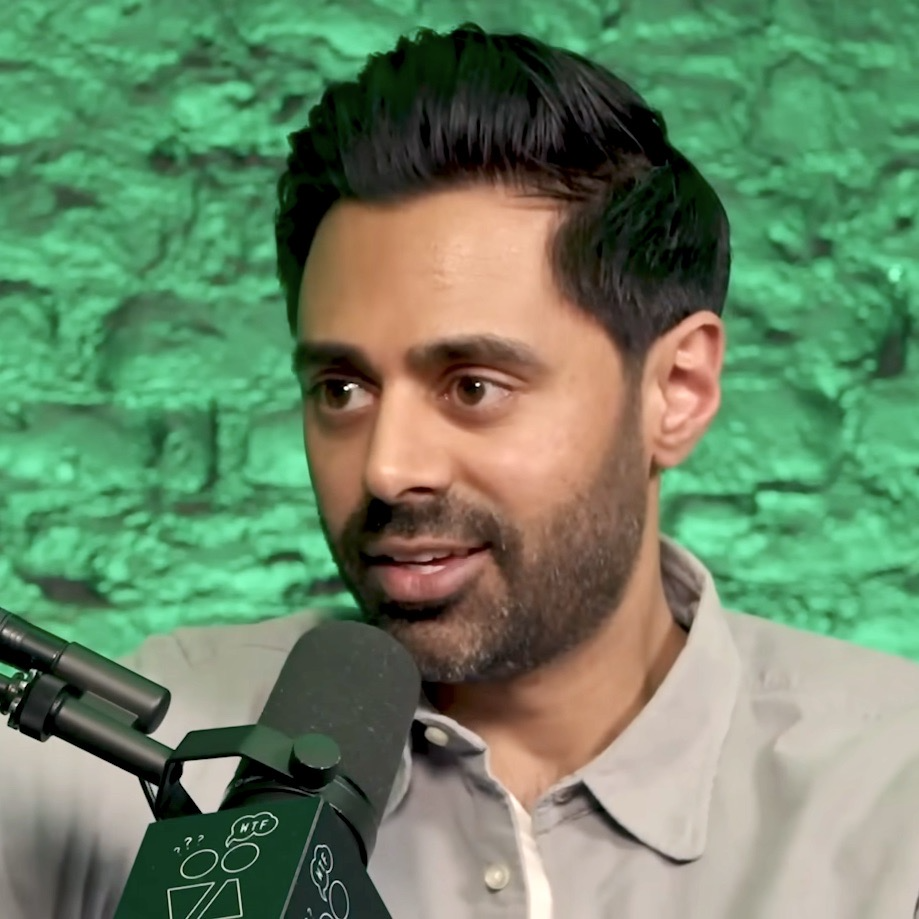
Hasan Minhaj, comedian

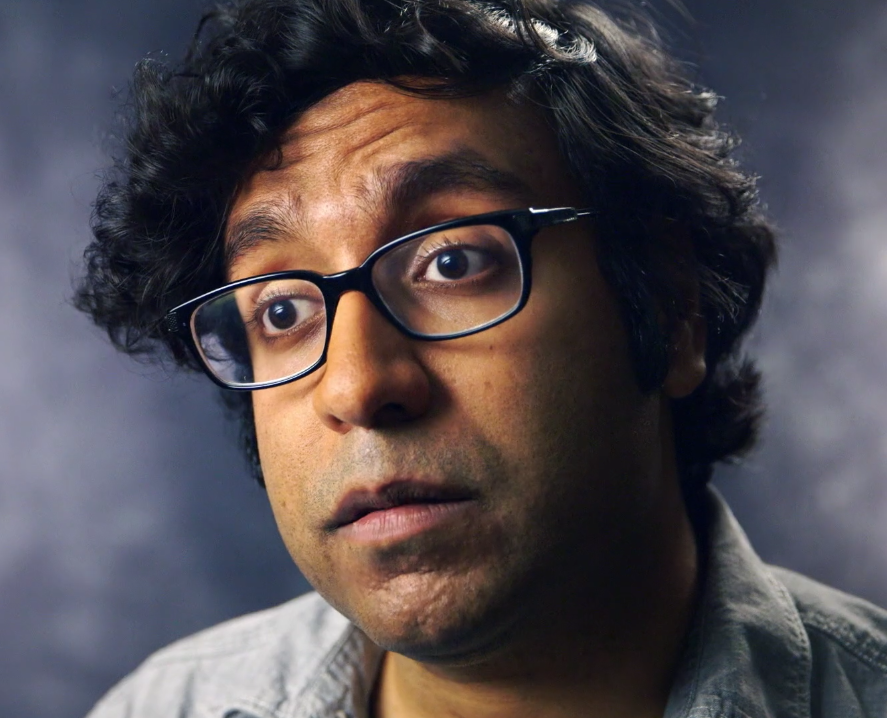
Hari Kondabolu, comedian

- Aziz Ansari
- Aman Ali
- Arj Barker
- Gerry Bednob
- Aasif Mandvi
- Jay Chandrasekhar
- Hari Kondabolu
- Hasan Minhaj
- Nimesh Patel
- Adam Mamawala
- Rajiv Satyal
- Akaash Singh
- Anish Shah
- Paul Varghese, appeared on Last Comic Standing
- Aparna Nancherla
- Zarna Garg, comedian and lawyer

=== Culinary arts ===
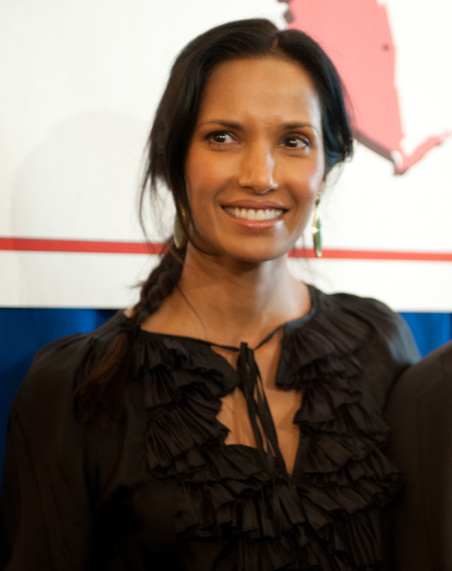
Padma Lakshmi

- Ashok Bajaj, restaurateur
- Vishwesh Bhatt, chef
- Maneet Chauhan, celebrity chef, restaurateur, author
- H. Jay Dinshah, founded the American Vegan Society
- Raghavan Iyer, chef, author, culinary educator
- Vikas Khanna, Michelin starred celebrity chef, restaurateur, author, filmmaker, and TV host
- Jehangir Mehta, celebrity chef, restaurateur, author
- Rajat Parr, sommelier
- Suvir Saran, Michelin starred chef and author
- Aarti Sequeira (b. 1978), TV host on Food Network
- Vikram Sunderam (b. 1967), chef and author
- Padma Lakshmi

=== Fashion ===
- Naeem Khan
- Vashtie Kola, of half Indian descent
- Bibhu Mohapatra
- Rachel Roy
- Sachin & Babi
- Vinoodh Matadin

=== Models ===
- Anchal Joseph, contestant on Cycle 7 of America's Next Top Model
- Pooja Kumar, model
- Akshay Kapoor, model, actor
- Arjun Sarkar, model, doctor, astronaut

=== Media ===
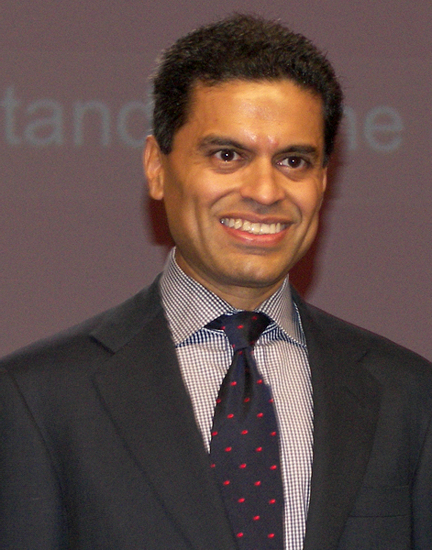
Fareed Zakaria, journalist

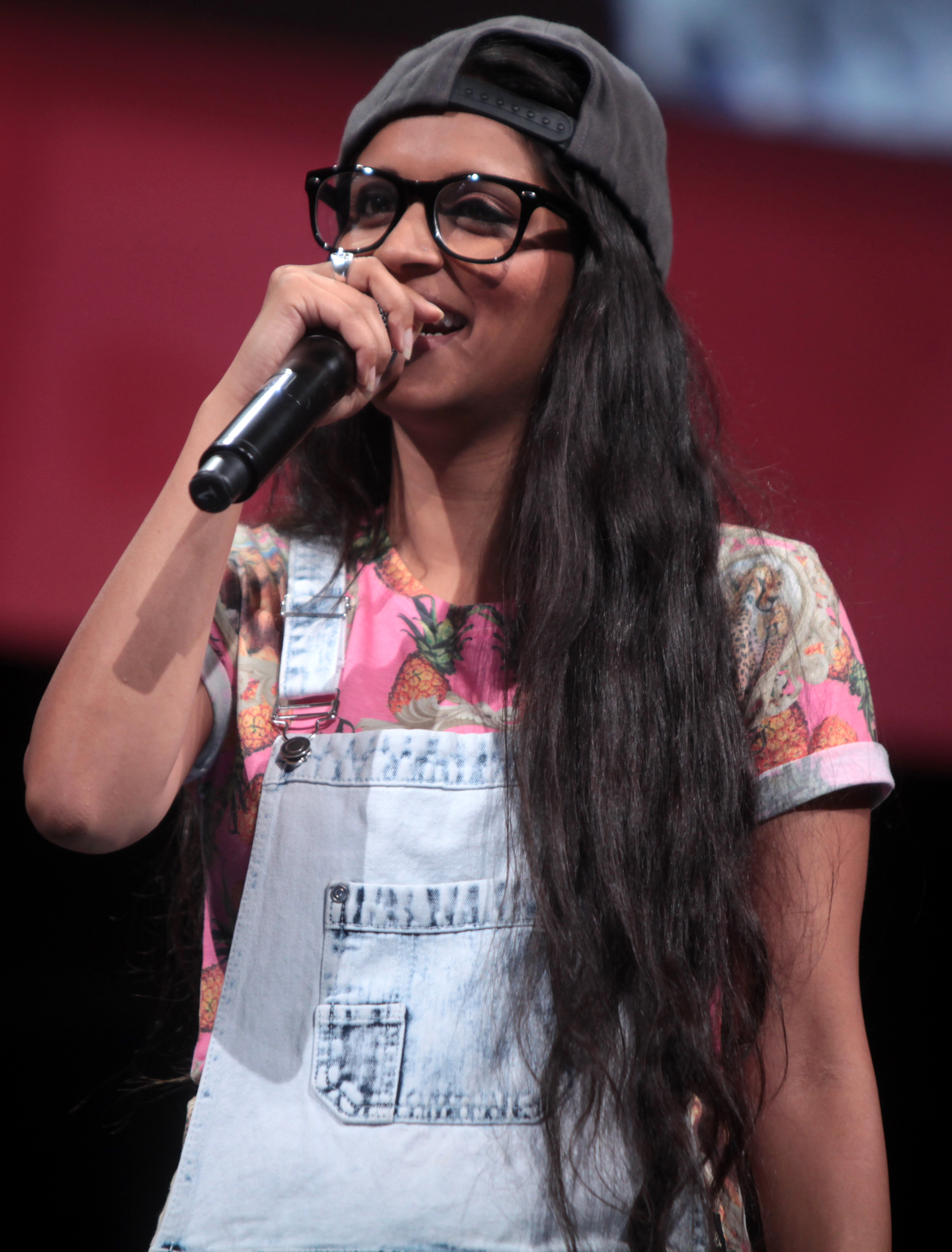
Lilly Singh, actress and YouTuber

- Rajan Devadas, photojournalist
- Manu Raju (b. 1980), CNN journalist anchor, reporter
- Deepak Ananthapadmanabha, online journalist
- Sanjay Gupta, journalist, medical correspondent, neurosurgeon
- Rajiv Chandrasekaran, assistant managing editor for continuous news, The Washington Post; author of Imperial Life in the Emerald City
- Syma Chowdhry, television host, reporter, and producer
- Priya David, correspondent for CBS News
- Dinesh D'Souza, political commentator, author and filmmaker. Former president of The King's College, New York
- Deepa Fernandes, host of the WBAI radio program Wakeup Call
- Pico Iyer, author and journalist for Time magazine, Harper's Magazine, Condé Nast Traveler, and The New York Review of Books
- Suma Josson, journalist and filmmaker
- Sukanya Krishnan, news anchor for CW 11 Morning News on WPIX
- Raj Mathai, television journalist
- Seema Mody, news reporter/anchor for CNBC
- Mish Michaels, meteorologist for the WBZ-TV Weather Team
- Vinita Nair, anchor of World News Now and America This Morning on ABC
- Kevin Negandhi, sports anchor for ESPN SportsCenter
- Reena Ninan, Middle East correspondent for Fox News Channel
- Asra Nomani, journalist
- Safiya Nygaard, YouTube beauty creator
- Uma Pemmaraju, senior news anchor for Fox News Channel
- Ramesh Ponnuru, senior editor of the National Review magazine
- Ash-har Quraishi, correspondent, WTTW Chicago; former KCTV Chief Investigative Reporter; former CNN Islamabad Bureau Chief
- Gopal Raju, pioneer of Indian American ethnic media
- Aneesh Raman, first Indian-American presidential speechwriter under President Barack Obama, former CNN Middle East correspondent
- Alpana Singh, television personality
- Lakshmi Singh, NPR's national midday newscaster
- Hari Sreenivasan, correspondent for CBS News and the PBS NewsHour
- Sreenath Sreenivasan, Columbia University professor; WABC-TV technology reporter
- Ali Velshi, business news anchor for CNN
- Zain Verjee, CNN anchor
- Rohit Vyas, first and longest serving Indian American broadcast journalist
- Fareed Zakaria, columnist for Time magazine and host of Fareed Zakaria GPS on CNN
- Lilly Singh, YouTuber of Indian descent widely known as IISuperwomanII, ranked tenth on the Forbes list of the world's highest paid YouTube stars, ranked first on 2017 Forbes Top Influencers List in the entertainment category
- Liza Koshy, actress, YouTube comedian and television host
- Ambreen Tariq, author, activist and founder of @BrownPeopleCamping
- N3on, streamer and YouTuber

=== Musicians ===
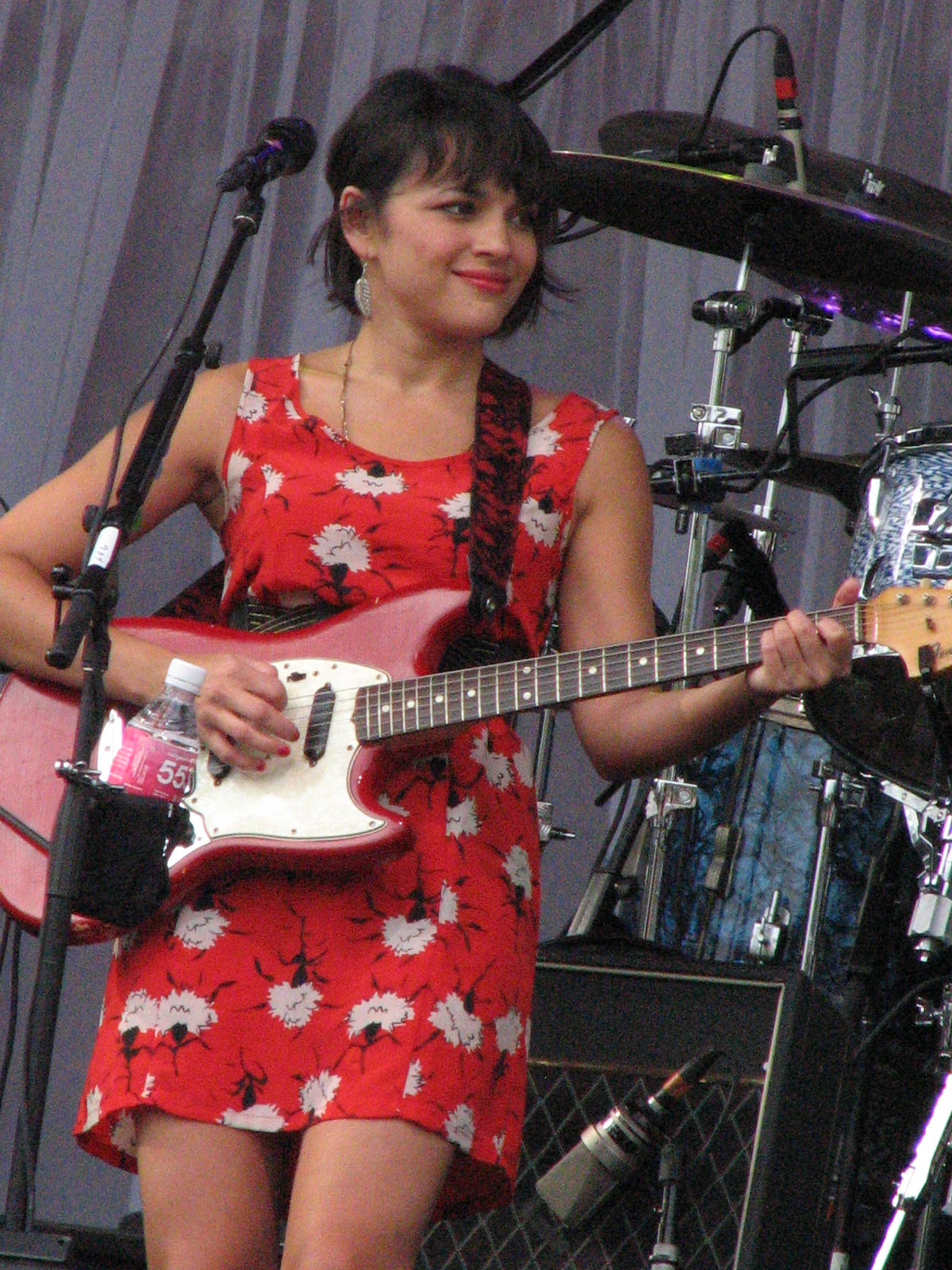
Norah Jones, singer and winner of multiple Grammy Awards

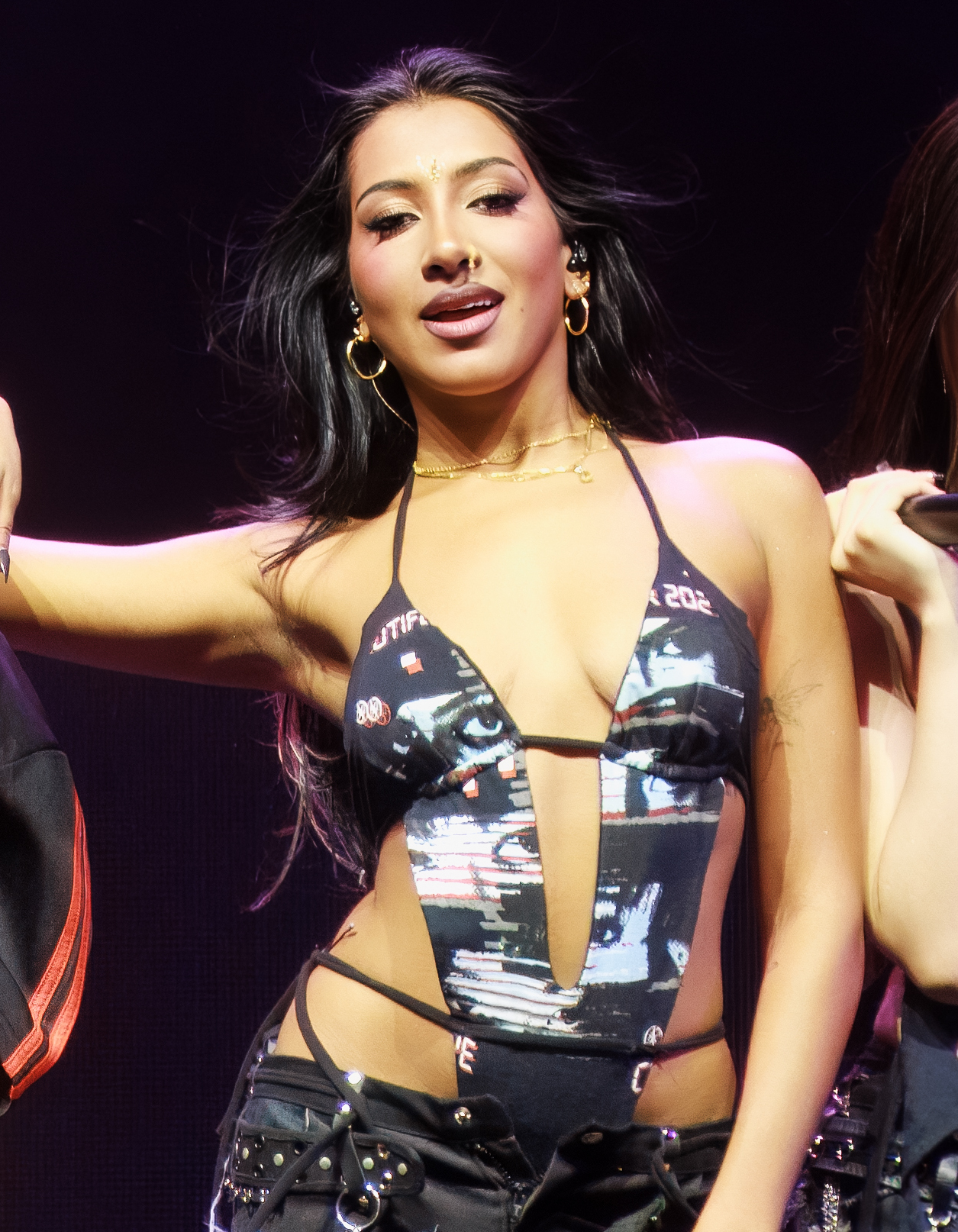
Lara Raj

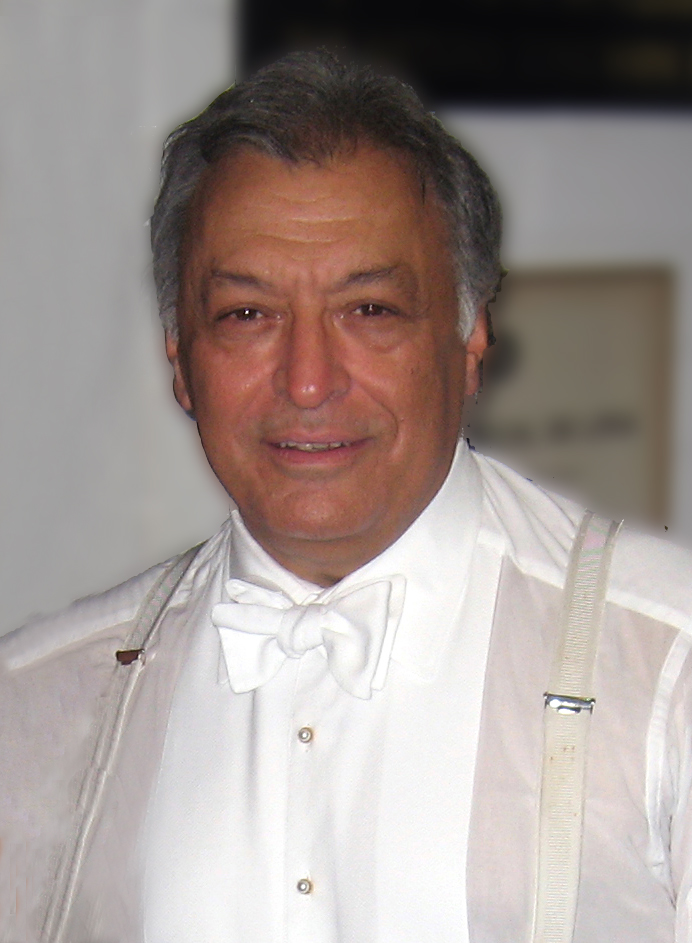
Zubin Mehta, musician and receiver of a star on the Hollywood Walk of Fame

- Rick Parashar (1963–2014), producer
- Sandeep Das (b. 1971), won the Grammy award for Best World Music Album, at the 59th Grammy Awards, 2017
- Sonika Vaid, singer
- Bamboo Shoots, dance-rock band
- 6ix, record producer
- Rajiv Dhall, singer
- Sid Sriram, singer
- Jeff Bhasker, producer
- Nicki Minaj, rapper and singer-songwriter of half Indian descent
- Sameer Bhattacharya, one of two guitarists in the Texas alternative rock band Flyleaf
- Das Racist, alternative hip hop group; two of the three members are Indian
- Anoop Desai, finalist on the eighth season of American Idol
- Falu, singer and songwriter
- Sameer Gadhia, lead vocalist in Young the Giant
- Terry Vivkeanand Gajraj, chutney-soca singer
- Heems, rapper
- Ravi Hutheesing, singer-songwriter, guitarist
- iLoveMakonnen, rapper
- Daya, singer
- Raja Kumari, singer and songwriter
- Vijay Iyer, jazz musician and composer
- Sunny Jain, dhol player, drummer, and composer
- Norah Jones, singer, songwriter and actress; winner of multiple Grammy Awards
- Raleigh Rajan, Music Composer, Songwriter and multi instrumentalist
- Karsh Kale, producer, composer and musician
- Tony Kanal, two-time Grammy Award winner, bass player for No Doubt
- Appu Krishnan, known professionally as The Professor, music producer and songwriter
- Ashok Kondabolu, rapper (also known as Dapwell)
- Savan Kotecha, songwriter
- KSHMR, electronic musician, record producer
- Arun Luthra, jazz musician
- Sanjaya Malakar, finalist on the sixth season of American Idol
- Mathai, finalist on season 2 of The Voice
- Zarin Mehta, executive director of the New York Philharmonic Orchestra
- Zubin Mehta, former conductor, New York Philharmonic Orchestra; receiver of a star on the Hollywood Walk of Fame
- Sanjay Mishra, guitarist and composer
- Rachika Nayar, musician
- Thara Prashad, R&B singer and model of half Indian descent
- Vidya Vox, YouTube musician
- Vasant Rai, performer of Indian music
- Lara Raj, singer and member of Katseye
- Rhea Raj, singer and songwriter
- Saleka, singer-songwriter and actress
- Paul Sabu, producer
- Amar Sandhu, singer
- Shaheen Sheik, songwriter
- Bikram Singh, singer
- Mickey Singh, singer from Detroit, MI
- Justine Skye, singer
- Ramesh Srivastava, singer
- Ambi Subramaniam, violinist and composer
- Bindu Subramaniam, singer-songwriter
- Kim Thayil, named among 100th greatest guitarists of all time by Rolling Stone
- Rozonda Thomas, singer
- Zoya, California-based singer and guitarist
- Sanjay Patel, animator and director and also illustrator of Pixar
- Shirish Korde (b. 1945), composer
- Raveena Aurora, alternative singer and songwriter
- Olivia, singer
- Lisa Mishra, singer and actress

== Business ==
- Aditya Agarwal, former CTO of Dropbox
- Parag Agrawal, former CEO of Twitter
- Revathi Advaithi, CEO of Flex
- Anu Aiyengar, Managing Director of North American Mergers and Acquisitions of JPMorgan Chase & Co
- Nikesh Arora (b. 1968), CEO, Palo Alto Networks, former Google executive and COO, Softbank
- Samir Arora, former CEO of Mode Media
- Ramani Ayer, former Chairman and CEO of The Hartford Financial Services Group
- Sunny Balwani, former President and Chief Operating Officer of Theranos
- Steve Banerjee, Co-founder of Chippendales
- Prith Banerjee, Managing Director of Global Technology R&D at Accenture
- Ajay Banga, President and CEO of MasterCard
- Mahaboob Ben Ali (1927–2009), Co-Founder of Ben's Chili Bowl
- Krishna Bharat, Computer Scientist and Founder of Google News
- Manoj Bhargava, Founder and CEO of Innovations Ventures LLC; the company is known for producing the 5-hour Energy drink
- Baiju Bhatt, Founder of Aetherflux and Co-founder and Co-CEO of Robinhood
- Sabeer Bhatia, Co-Founder of Hotmail
- Aneel Bhusri, co-founder and CEO of Workday, Inc.; partner at Greylock Partners; member of the board of directors of Intel
- Jagjeet (Jeet) S. Bindra, director of Edison International, Southern California Edison
- Sanjit Biswas, co-founder of Cisco Meraki and Samsara (company)
- Amar Bose, founder and chairman of Bose Corporation
- Vanu Bose, American electrical engineer, founder of Vanu Inc, son of Amar Bose
- Gurbaksh Chahal, Founder of ClickAgent and BlueLithium
- Sant Singh Chatwal, owner of the Bombay Palace chain of restaurants and Hampshire Hotels & Resorts
- Jay Chaudhry, co-founder of Zscaler
- Manu Daftary, money manager
- Bharat Desai, co-founder and chairman of Syntel
- Gururaj Deshpande, founder of Sycamore Networks
- Francis deSouza, CEO of Illumina
- Anirudh Devgan, CEO and President of Cadence Design Systems
- Vinod Dham, designed the Intel Pentium Chip Processor; the "father of the Pentium Chip"
- Rono Dutta, former president of United Airlines, chairman of Air Sahara
- Rhona Fox, founder of Fox Fuse
- Amrapali Gan, marketing executive and former CEO of OnlyFans
- Rakesh Gangwal, former CEO and chairman of US Airways Group
- Asim Ghosh, president and chief executive officer at Husky Energy
- Srinivas (Srini) Gopalan, CEO of T-Mobile
- Ajit Gupta, founder and CEO of Speedera Networks, Aryaka Networks
- Rajat Gupta, former managing director of McKinsey & Company
- Rajiv Gupta, CEO of SkyHigh Networks, former general manager of Hewlett-Packard
- Umang Gupta, former CEO of Keynote Systems, Inc.
- Ajit Jain, president of Berkshire Hathaway Reinsurance Group
- Anjli Jain, founder and Managing Partner of EVC Ventures
- Ankur Jain, Founder of Kairos HQ & VP of Product at Tinder (app)
- Anshu Jain, President of Cantor Fitzgerald and former co-CEO of Deutsche Bank
- Naveen Jain, Chairman of Moon Express
- Sanjay Jha, CEO of Global Foundries and former CEO of Motorola Mobile Devices
- Vyomesh Joshi, former executive vice president of Imaging and Printing Group, Hewlett-Packard
- John Kapoor, founder and executive chairman of Insys Therapeutics
- Vimal Kapur, CEO of Honeywell
- Reshma Kewalramani, CEO and president of Vertex Pharmaceuticals
- Vinod Khosla, founder of Khosla Ventures, co-founder of Sun Microsystems
- Arvind Krishna, CEO of IBM
- Anil Kumar, former senior partner and chairman, Asia Center of McKinsey & Company
- Sanjay Kumar, former CEO of Computer Associates International
- Shalabh Kumar, industrialist and Republican political donor, founder of the Republican Hindu Coalition
- George Kurian, business executive; chief executive officer and a member of the board of NetApp; previously executive vice president of product operations at NetApp
- Thomas Kurian, CEO of Google Cloud and former President of product development at Oracle Corporation
- Sachin Lawande, president and CEO of Visteon
- Krishna Maharaj, businessman convicted of murder
- Apoorva Mehta, Founder of Instacart
- Sonny Mehta, Chairman/Editor in chief of Alfred A. Knopf
- Sanjay Mehrotra, Co-Founder of SanDisk and CEO of Micron
- Victor Menezes, chairman of Clearing House Association, former chairman and CEO of Citibank
- Neal Mohan, CEO of YouTube
- Satya Nadella, CEO of Microsoft
- Leena Nair, CEO of Chanel
- Lakshmi Narayanan, vice chairman and former CEO of Cognizant Corporation
- Laxman Narasimhan, former CEO of Starbucks
- Vasant Narasimhan, CEO of Novartis
- Shantanu Narayen, CEO of Adobe Systems
- Reena Ninan, Owner of Good Trouble Productions
- Indra Nooyi, former chairman and CEO of PepsiCo
- Vikram Pandit, former CEO of Citigroup
- Sankaet Pathak, founder of Synapse Financial Technologies and Foundation robotics
- Suhas Patil, entrepreneur, venture capitalist & Founder of Cirrus Logic
- David C. Paul, Billionaire and Founder and executive chairman of Globus Medical
- Sundar Pichai, CEO of Google, Alphabet Inc
- Dev Pragad, President and CEO of Newsweek
- Stanley Praimnath, bank executive and survivor of the September 11 attacks
- Prakash Puram, president and CEO of iXmatch
- Vivek Ramaswamy, founder of Roivant Sciences, candidate in the 2024 Republican Party presidential primaries
- Vivek Ranadivé, former CEO of TIBCO Software
- Naval Ravikant, co-founder, chairman and former CEO of AngelList, investor, and entrepreneur
- Sashi Reddi, serial entrepreneur, venture capitalist, angel investor, technologist, and philanthropist
- Kanwal Rekhi, former EVP and CTO of Novell
- Punit Renjen, Former CEO of Deloitte
- Abbas Sadriwala, chairman and CEO of the Fort Lauderdale-based Wireless Logix Group
- Arun Sarin, former president of Vodafone
- Ashutosh Saxena, Founder & CEO of Caspar.AI, prolific author in the area of AI, and former professor of Computer Science at Cornell University.
- Arjun Sethi, founder of Tribe Capital and CEO of Kraken
- Neerja Sethi, Billionaire and Co-Founded IT consulting and outsourcing firm Syntel
- Niraj Shah, CEO and co-founder of Wayfair
- Deven Sharma, former president of Standard & Poor's
- Ram Shriram, venture fund capitalist and one of the first investors in Google
- Pradeep Sindhu, founder and CTO of Juniper Networks
- Ravi Kumar Singisetti, CEO of Cognizant
- K. R. Sridhar, founder and CEO of Bloom Energy
- Aravind Srinivas, Co-Founder, President & CEO of Perplexity AI
- Balaji Srinivasan, Co-founder of Counsyl, former CTO of Coinbase, and former general partner at Andreessen Horowitz
- Raj Subramaniam, CEO and President of FedEx Corporation
- Anjali Sud, CEO of Tubi and Former CEO of Vimeo
- Rajeev Suri, CEO of Nokia
- Dhivya Suryadevara, CEO of Optum Financial, part of UnitedHealth Group
- Abhi Talwalkar, president and CEO of LSI Corporation
- Chandrika Tandon, Businesswoman and Artist
- Jayshree Ullal, Billionaire and CEO and president of Arista Networks
- Jay Vijayan, founder of Tekion Corp, former CIO of Tesla
- Romesh Wadhwani, founder, chairman and CEO of Symphony Technology Group
- Padmasree Warrior, former CEO of Nio (car company) USA

== Crime ==
- Steve Banerjee, convicted arsonist, racketeer, and murderer
- Sant Singh Chatwal, pled guilty to giving illegal campaign contributions for the Democratic Party
- Gurmeet Singh Dhinsa, convicted murderer, racketeer, and kidnapper
- Syed Ghulam Nabi Fai, convicted of espionage for Pakistan
- Rajat Gupta, convicted financial fraudster who participated in the Galleon scandal
- Noshir Gowadia, convicted of espionage for China
- Anand Jon, convicted rapist
- John Kapoor, convicted financial fraudster
- Subhash Kapoor, convicted of art theft and grand larceny
- Anil Kumar, convicted financial fraudster
- Shelley Malil, convicted of attempted premeditated murder and assault
- Nirav Modi, fugitive charged with corruption, fraud, and money laundering
- Jayant Patel, convicted of fraud and manslaughter
- Purvi Patel, convicted and later acquitted of feticide
- Lakireddy Bali Reddy, convicted human trafficker and immigration fraudster
- Prakashanand Saraswati, fugitive and convicted child molester
- Ravi Singh, convicted of four felony counts for illegally influencing the San Diego mayoral election
- Sabrina De Sousa, convicted kidnapper
- Sneha Anne Philip, missing person
- Dinesh D'Souza Political criminal, campaign finance violations

== Literature ==
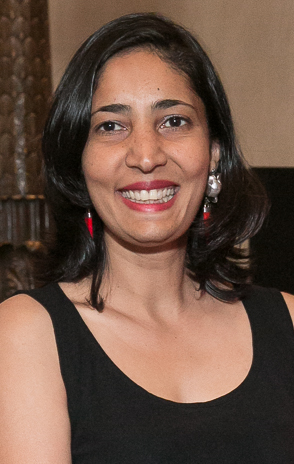
Kiran Desai, winner of the 2006 Man Booker Prize

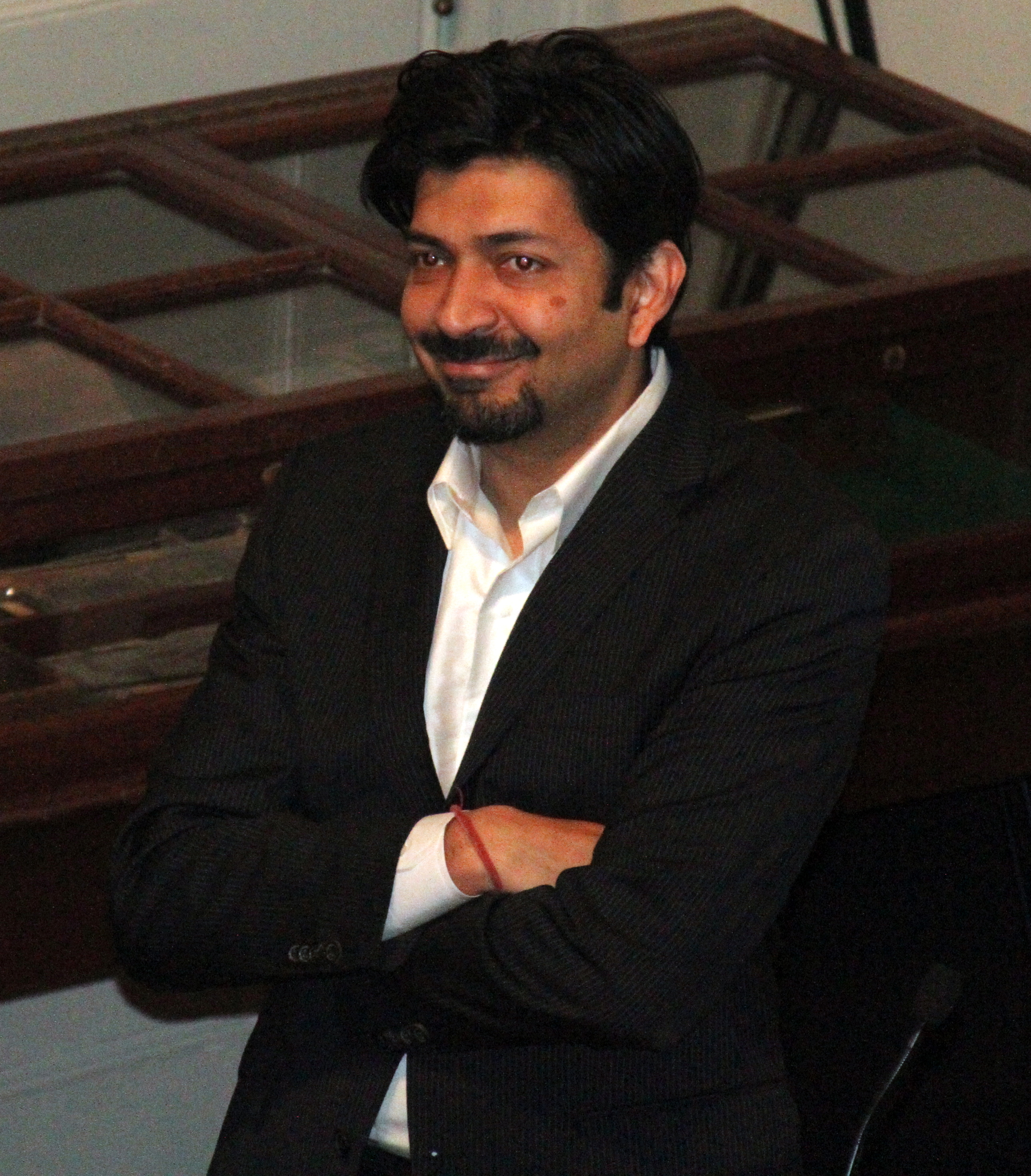
Siddhartha Mukherjee, physician and 2011 winner of the Pulitzer Prize for General Nonfiction

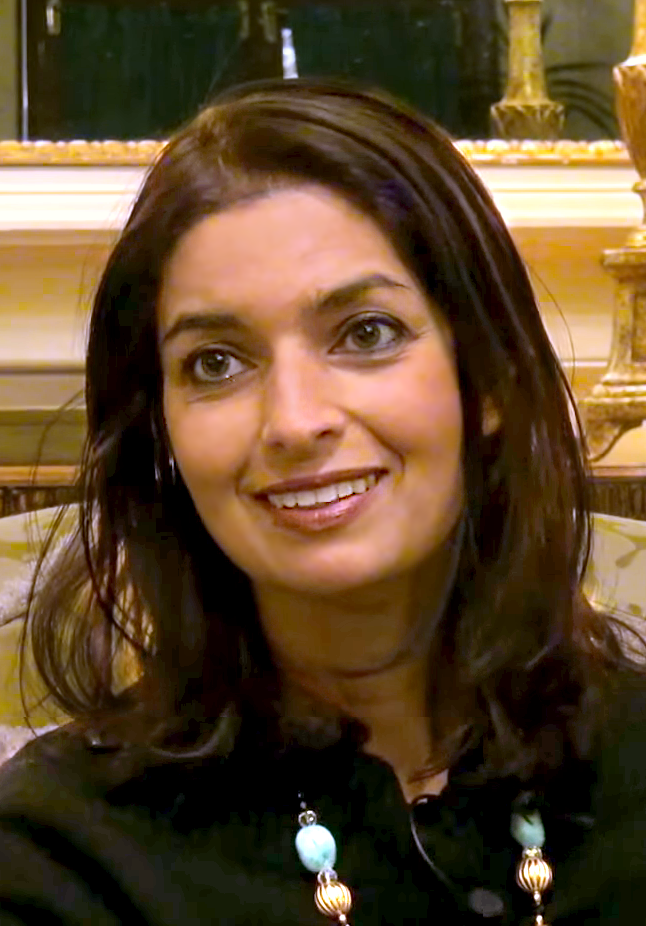
Jhumpa Lahiri, winner of the 2000 Pulitzer Prize for Fiction

- Abraham Verghese, doctor and author; wrote In My Own Country and My Tennis Partner
- Agha Shahid Ali, poet
- Aimee Nezhukumatathil, poet
- Alka Joshi, author
- Amitav Ghosh, Indo-nostalgic writer and winner of Prix Médicis étranger
- Anita Desai, novelist; shortlisted for the Booker Prize three times; mother of Kiran Desai
- Anju Hasan, author, of Neti, Neti
- Anu Garg, author, speaker, and computer engineer
- Arnold Rampersad, biographer and literary critic
- Bhaskar Sunkara, political writer, founding editor and publisher of Jacobin and current publisher of London's Tribune
- Bharati Mukherjee, author, professor
- Chitra Banerjee Divakaruni, author
- Davan Maharaj, journalist and former editor-in-chief and publisher of the Los Angeles Times
- Dhan Gopal Mukerji, first successful Indian man of letters in the US; winner of the Newbery Medal, 1928
- Gaiutra Bahadur, author
- Ghalib Shiraz Dhalla, author
- Gita Mehta, author
- Harischandra Khemraj, writer
- Indira Ganesan, novelist
- Indira Viswanathan Peterson, literary critic
- Indu Sundaresan, author
- Ismat Chughtai, author
- Ismith Khan, author and educator
- Jhumpa Lahiri, Pulitzer Prize-winning author
- Kaavya Viswanathan, novelist
- Kiran Desai, winner of the 2006 Man Booker Prize
- Meena Alexander, poet, scholar, and writer
- Mira Jacob, writer
- Parag Khanna, author
- Paul Kalanithi, author
- Rajiv Joseph, playwright
- Rajiv Mohabir, poet
- Ramya Ramana, poet
- Ravi Batra, bestselling author and economist
- Ravi Shankar, poet
- Rishi Reddi, author
- Roshani Chokshi novelist
- Rupi Kaur, poet
- S. T. Joshi, literary critic
- Salman Rushdie, novelist and essayist
- Sandhya Menon, author
- Sanjena Sathian, novelist and journalist
- Sarah Thankam Mathews, novelist
- Saumitra Saxena, Hindi poet, Bharatiya Jnanpith Navlekhana Award winner
- Shanthi Sekaran, novelist and educator
- Shauna Singh Baldwin, novelist, winner of the Commonwealth Writers' Prize
- Siddhartha Mukherjee, physician, scientist and writer, 2011 winner of the Pulitzer Prize for General Nonfiction
- Susham Bedi, author
- Tania James, novelist
- Thrity Umrigar, author of Bombay Time
- Tulika Mehrotra, author, journalist
- Usha Haley, author
- Vijay Prashad, Marxist writer, director for Tricontinental, Chief editor for LeftWord Books, written 30 books
- Vijay Seshadri, Pulitzer Prize-winning poet and essayist
- Vikram Seth, poet, novelist, travel writer, librettist, children's writer, biographer and memoirist

== Military ==
- Uday Singh Taunque, first Indian American to die in Operation Iraqi Freedom; posthumously awarded Bronze Star and Purple Heart gallantry awards
- Sunita Williams (b. 1965), astronaut and former Navy officer
- Kareem Rashad Sultan Khan, United States Army specialist who was killed during Operation Iraqi Freedom and a recipient of the Bronze Star Medal and Purple Heart for his service

== Politics and government ==
- Stanley George, political strategist, known for his advisory role in the U.S. Republican Party and close association with President Donald Trump's political campaigns; also biographer

=== Federal elected officials ===
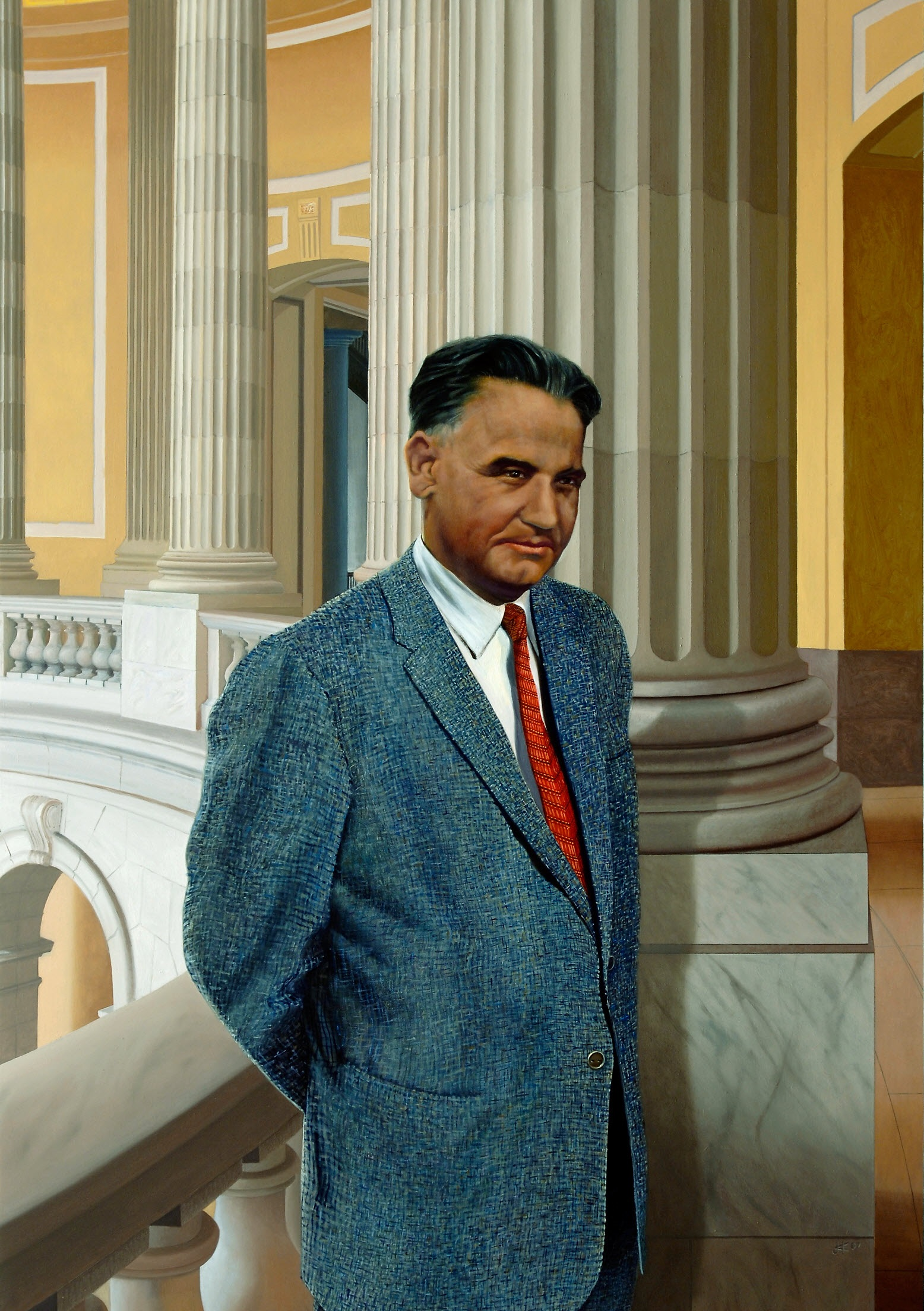
Dalip Singh Saund, first Indian American to be elected to the United States Congress

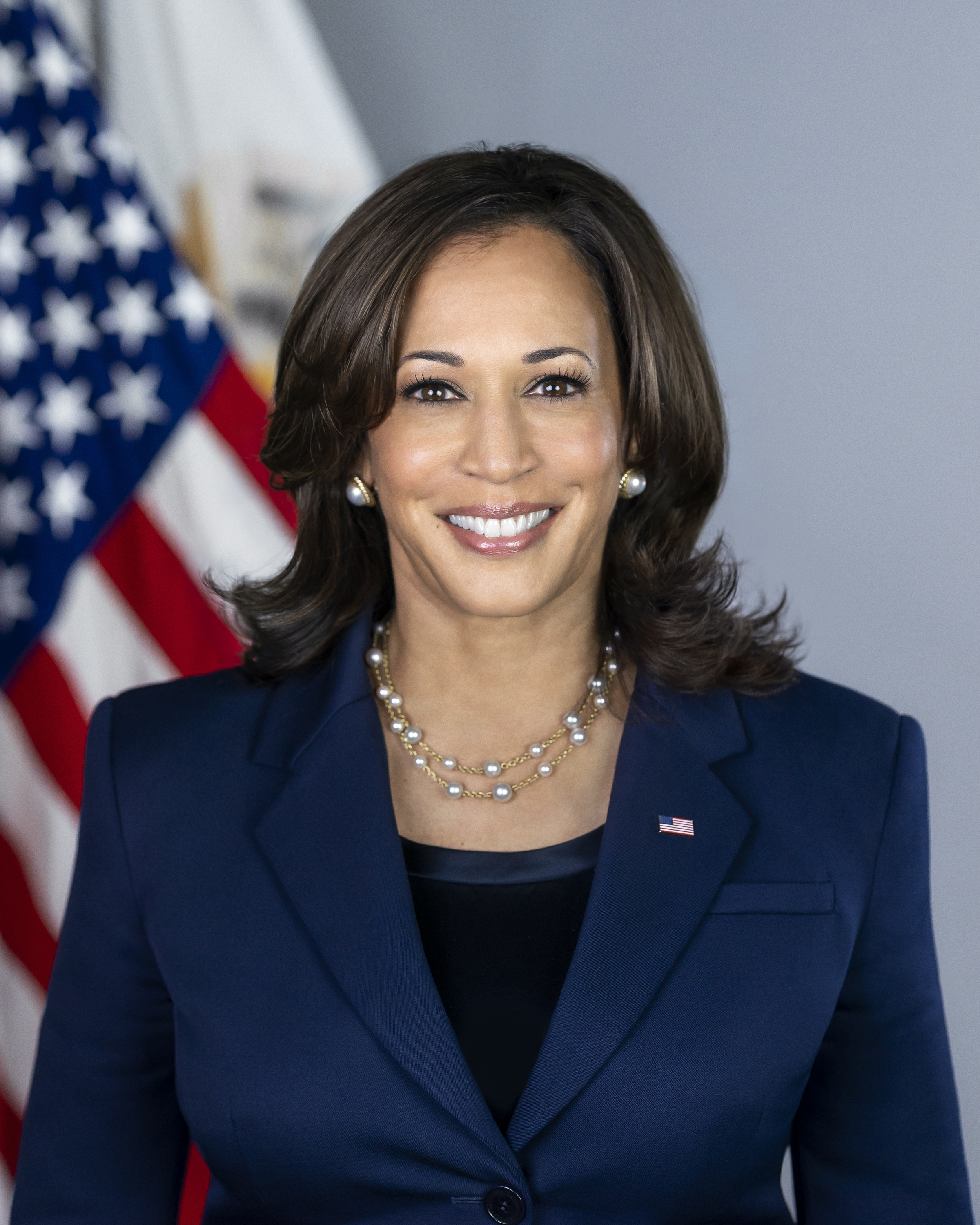
Kamala Harris, former Vice President of the United States.

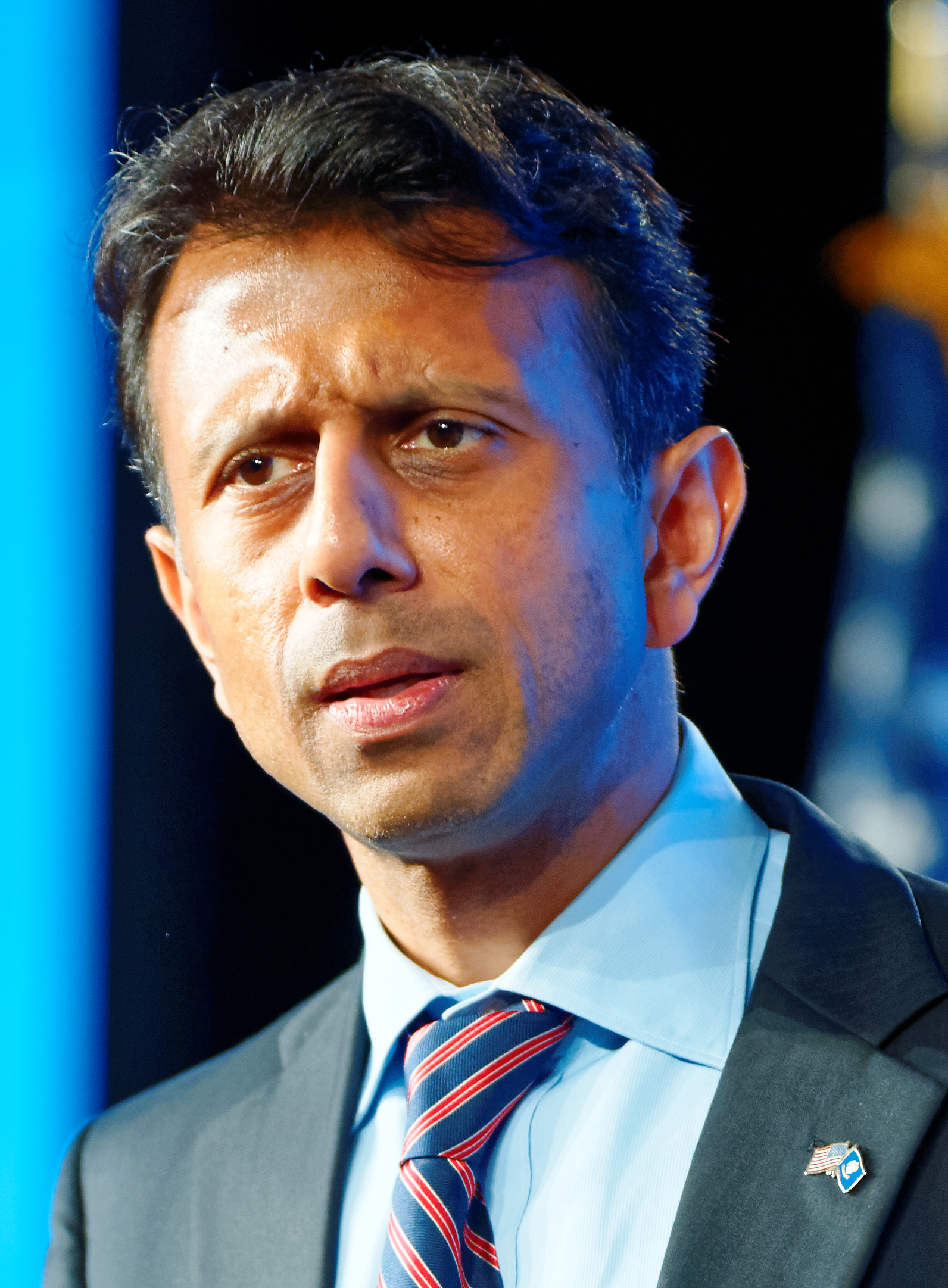
Bobby Jindal, first Indian American to be Governor of a U.S. state

- Kamala Harris (b. 1964), 49th Vice President of the United States, former U.S. Senator from California and 32nd Attorney General of California (Democratic)
- Bobby Jindal, First Indian-American Governor in U.S. History, served as the 55th governor of Louisiana (2008–2016); former U.S. Representative from Louisiana's 1st congressional district (2005–2008), Assistant Secretary of Health and Human Services for Planning and Evaluation (2001–2003) (Republican)
- Ami Bera, U.S. Representative for California's 6th congressional district (Democratic)
- Mervyn M. Dymally, 41st Lieutenant Governor of California (1975–1979); member of the U.S. House of Representatives (1981–1993) (Democratic)
- Raja Krishnamoorthi, U.S. Representative for Illinois's 8th congressional district (Democratic)
- Pramila Jayapal, U.S. Representative for Washington's 7th congressional district (Democratic)
- Ro Khanna, U.S. Representative for California's 17th congressional district (Democratic)
- Suhas Subramanyam, U.S. Representative for Virginia's 10th congressional district (Democratic)
- Dalip Singh Saund, first Asian and Indian American member of the U.S. House of Representatives from California (Democratic)
- Shri Thanedar, U.S. Representative for Michigan's 13th congressional district (Democratic)

=== Other elected officials ===
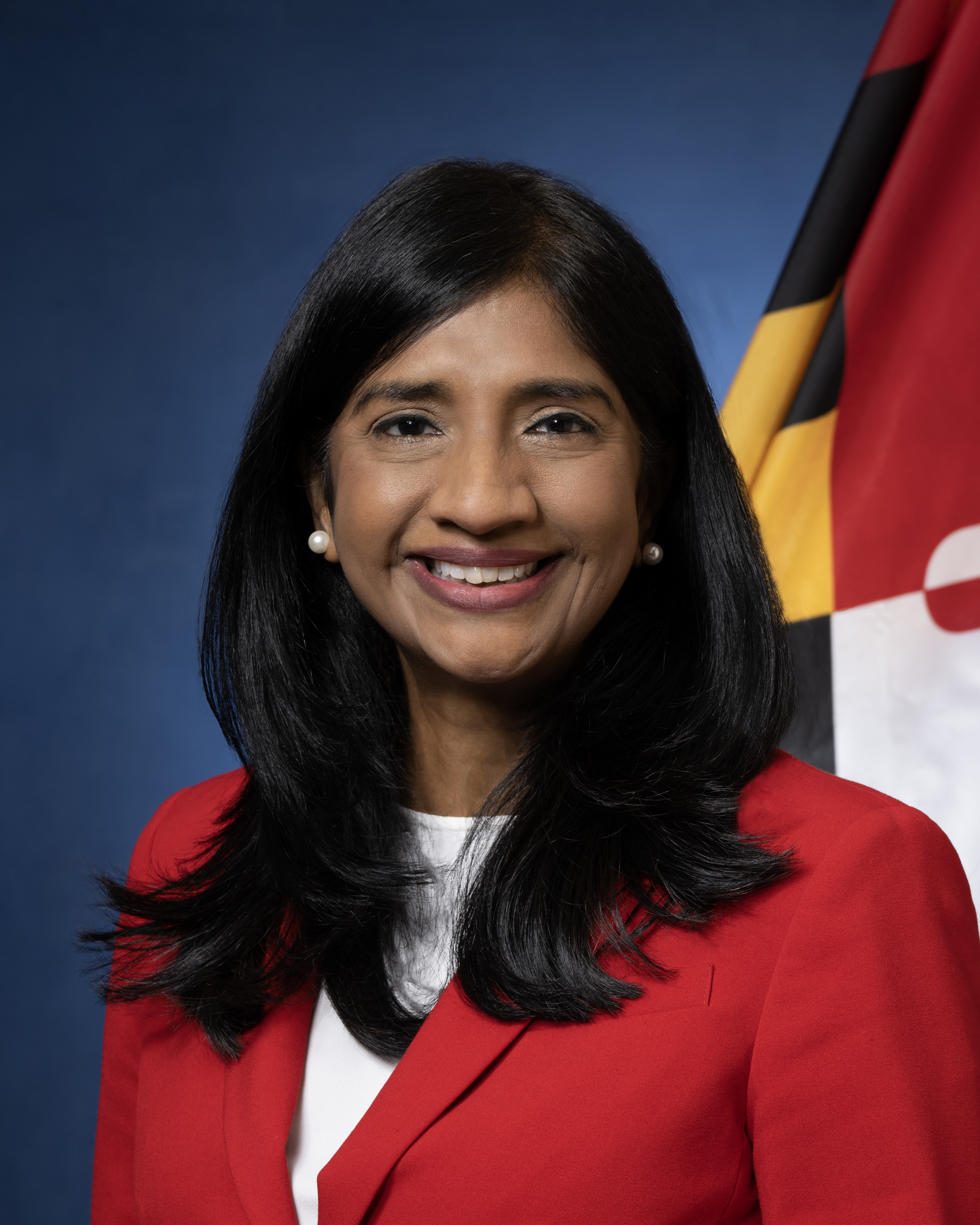
Aruna Miller, 10th Lieutenant Governor of Maryland

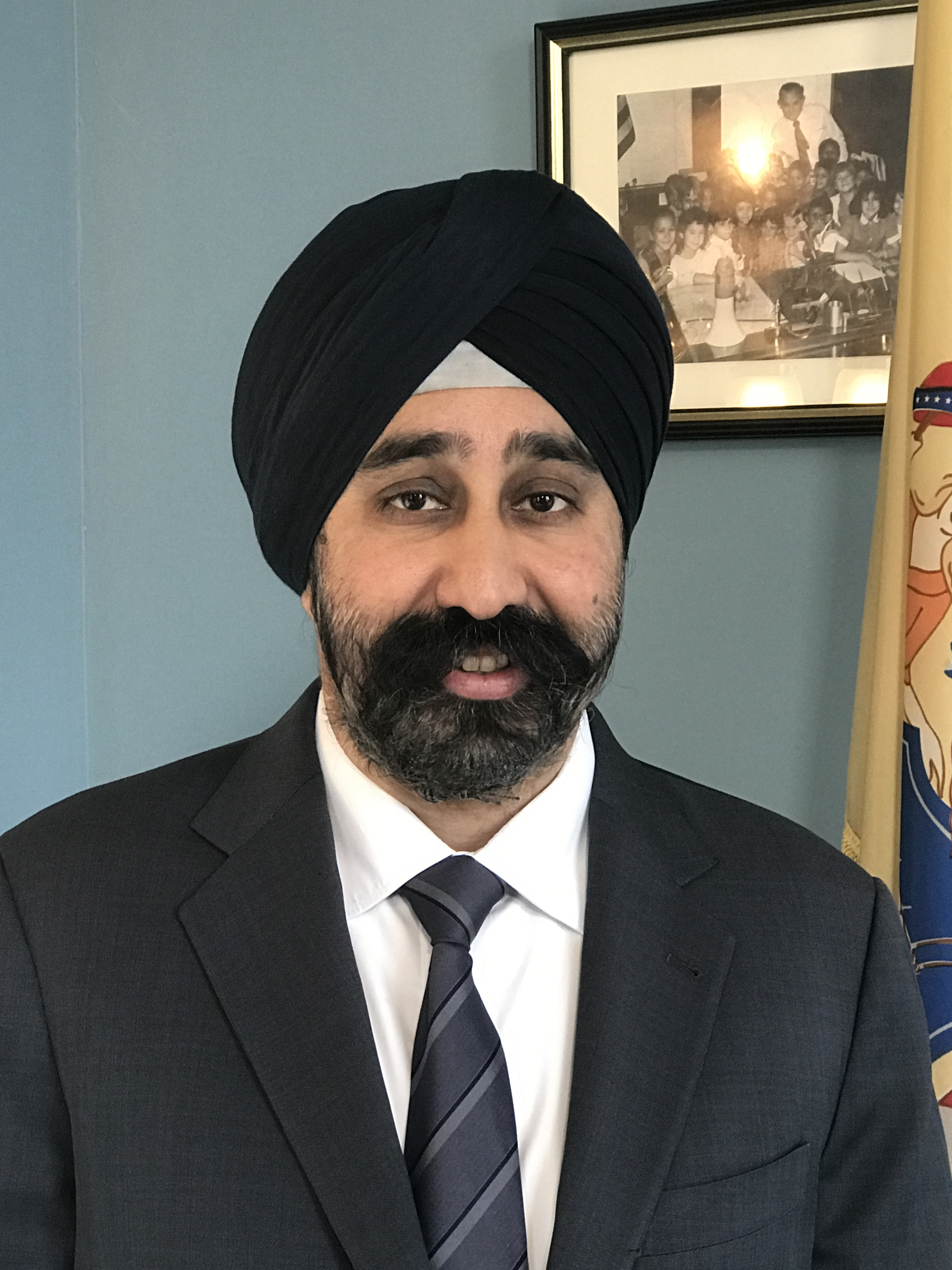
Ravinder Bhalla, elected the first turban-wearing Sikh U.S. mayor, of Hoboken, New Jersey

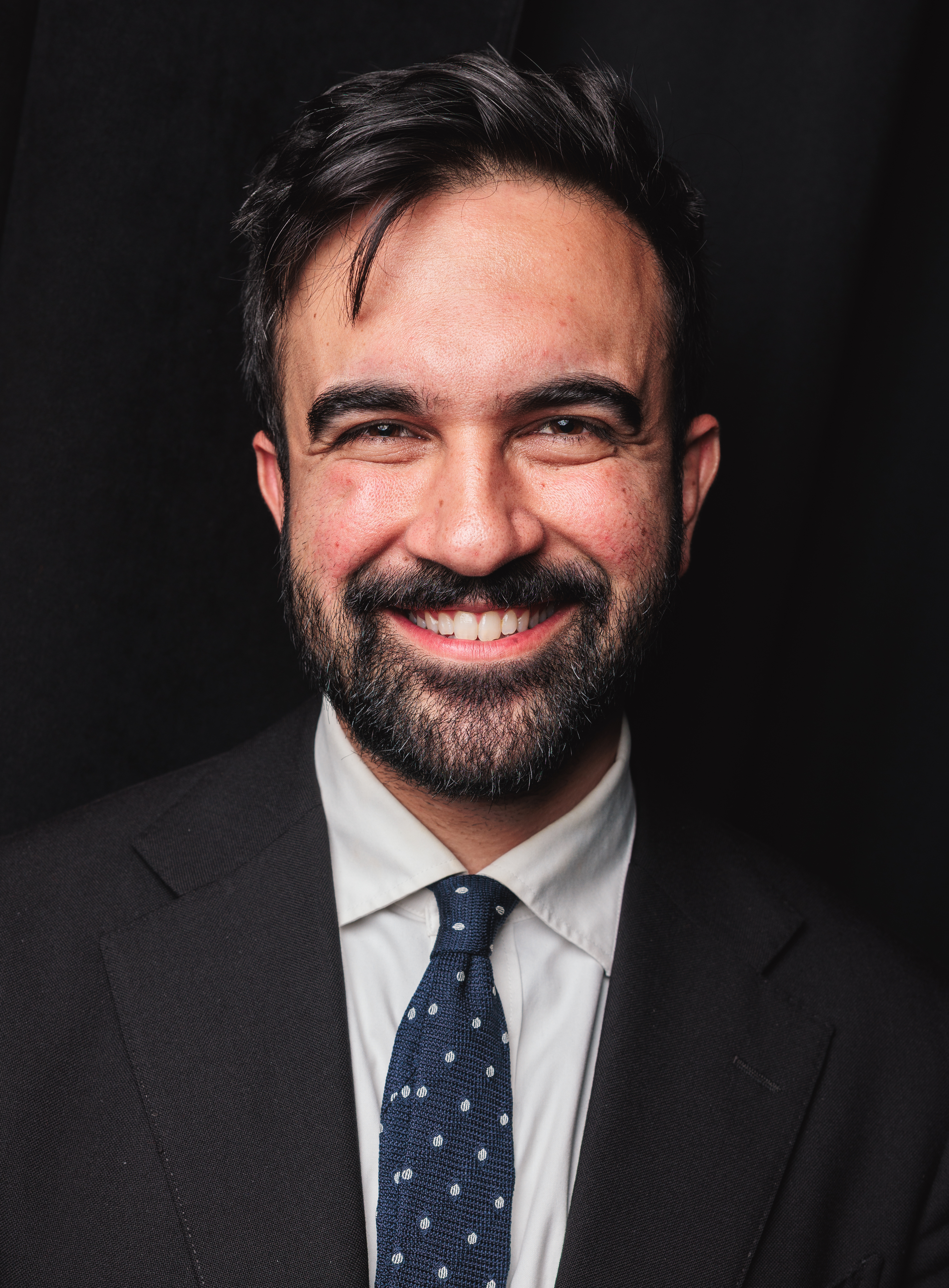
Zohran Mamdani, 112th Mayor of New York City

- John Abraham, former mayor of Teaneck, New Jersey (Republican)
- Abbas Akhil, former member of the New Mexico House of Representatives (Democratic)
- Saqib Ali, former member of the Maryland House of Delegates (Democratic)
- Nida Allam, Durham County Commissioner (Democratic)
- Niraj Antani - Ohio state senator (Republican)
- Harry Arora, former member of the Connecticut House of Representatives (Republican)
- Sam Arora, former member of the Maryland House of Delegates (Democratic)
- Kumar Barve, former member of the Maryland House of Delegates, former (majority leader) (Democratic), the first Indian American elected to a state legislature.
- Ravinder Bhalla, mayor, Hoboken, Hudson County, New Jersey (Democratic), the first turban-wearing Sikh American mayor in the United States to be elected by a municipality's residents, in November 2017.
- Satveer Chaudhary, former Minnesota State Senator (Democratic)
- Upendra J. Chivukula, former member of the New Jersey General Assembly, former Mayor of Franklin Township, New Jersey,Deputy Mayor of Franklin Township, New Jersey, member of the Franklin Township Council (Democratic)
- Jeremy Cooney, member of the New York State Senate (Democratic)
- Swati Dandekar (b. 1951), former member of the Iowa Senate, member of the Iowa House of Representatives (Democratic)
- Mona Das, former member of the Washington Senate (Democratic)
- Manka Dhingra, member of the Washington Senate (Democratic)
- Sara Gideon - former Speaker of the Maine House of Representatives (Democrat)
- Kashmir Gill, mayor of Yuba City, California, first Indian-American mayor in CA and first Sikh mayor in the US (Republican)
- Vin Gopal, took office in 2018 to represent the 11th Legislative District in the New Jersey Senate (Democratic)
- Jay Goyal, member of the Ohio State Representative (Democratic)
- Raj Goyle, member of the Kansas State Representative (Democratic)
- Ghazala Hashmi, 43rd Lieutenant Governor of Virginia (Democratic)
- Faz Husain, first native of India to win elected office in Michigan (Democratic)
- Susheela Jayapal, first Indian American to hold an elected office at the county level in Oregon, served as a county commissioner for Multnomah County, Oregon (Democratic)
- Ash Kalra, member of the California State Assembly for the 27th district from 2016–2022 and 25th district since 2022, member of the San Jose City Council from 2009–2016
- Nima Kulkarni, member of the Kentucky House of Representatives (Democratic)
- Sabi "Doc" Kumar, member of the Tennessee House of Representatives (Republican)
- Padma Kuppa, former member of the Michigan House of Representatives (2019–2022)
- Zohran Mamdani, member of the New York State Assembly from the 36th district (2021-2025) and Mayor of New York City from January 2026; son of Indian-American filmmaker Mira Nair.
- Sanjeev Manohar, member of the New Hampshire House of Representatives (Democratic)
- Nimi McConigley, first Indian American women to serve in any American State legislature served in the Wyoming State Legislature from 1994 until 1996 (Republican)
- Aruna Miller, 10th Lt. Governor of Maryland and the first South Asian woman elected lieutenant governor in the United States, (Democratic)
- Raj Mukherji, member of the New Jersey Senate, former member of the New Jersey General Assembly, Deputy Mayor of Jersey City, New Jersey, and Commissioner and Chairman of the Jersey City Housing Authority (Democratic)
- Ameya Pawar, served as the alderman for the 47th Ward of the City of Chicago.
- Aftab Pureval, mayor of Cincinnati (Democrat)
- Jenifer Rajkumar, member of the New York State Assembly (Democratic), representing the 38th district in Queens.
- Nithya Raman, politician serving as the Los Angeles City Council member for the 4th District since 2020; member of the Democratic Party and the Democratic Socialists of America; also urban planner and activist (Democratic)
- Harpreet Sandhu, former member of the Richmond, California City Council (Democratic)
- Kshama Sawant, former member of the Seattle City Council (Socialist Alternative)
- Harry Sidhu, Mayor of Anaheim, California, member of the Anaheim City Council (Republican)
- Balvir Singh, member of the New Jersey General Assembly, first Indian American member, Board of Chosen Freeholders, Burlington County, New Jersey, first Sikh American to win a countywide election in New Jersey, in November 2017 (Democratic)
- Vandana Slatter, member of the Washington State Senate since 2025, member of the Washington House of Representatives from 2017–2025
- Kannan Srinivasan, member of the Virginia Senate, former member of the Virginia House of Delegates (Democratic)
- Saggy Tahir, former member of the New Hampshire House of Representatives from 2001 until 2011 (Republican)
- Kevin Thomas, represented the 6th district in the New York State Senate from 2019 until 2024 (Democratic)
- Ram Villivalam- State Senator, 8th District- Illinois (Democrat)

=== Civil servants ===
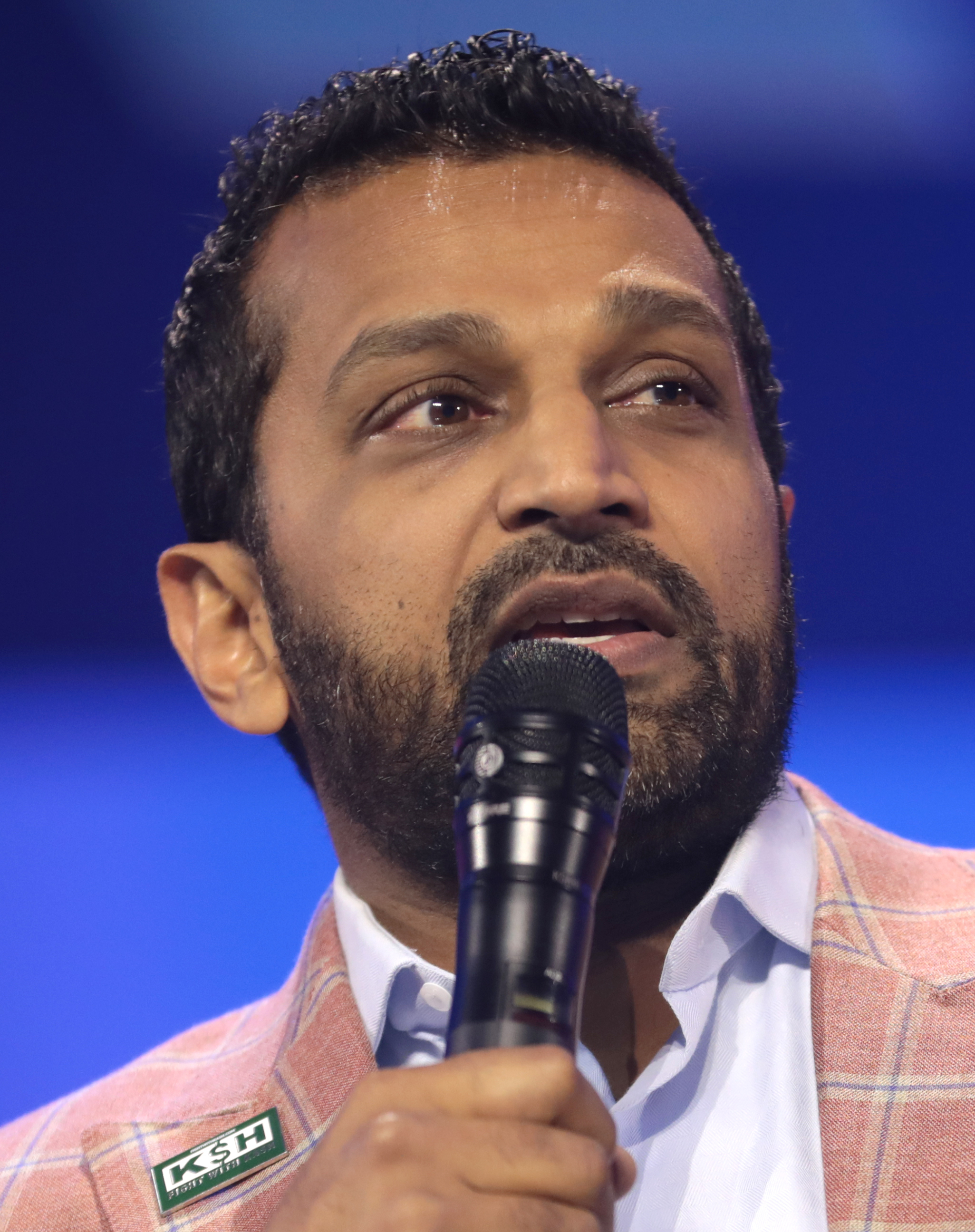
Kash Patel, 9th Director of the Federal Bureau of Investigation

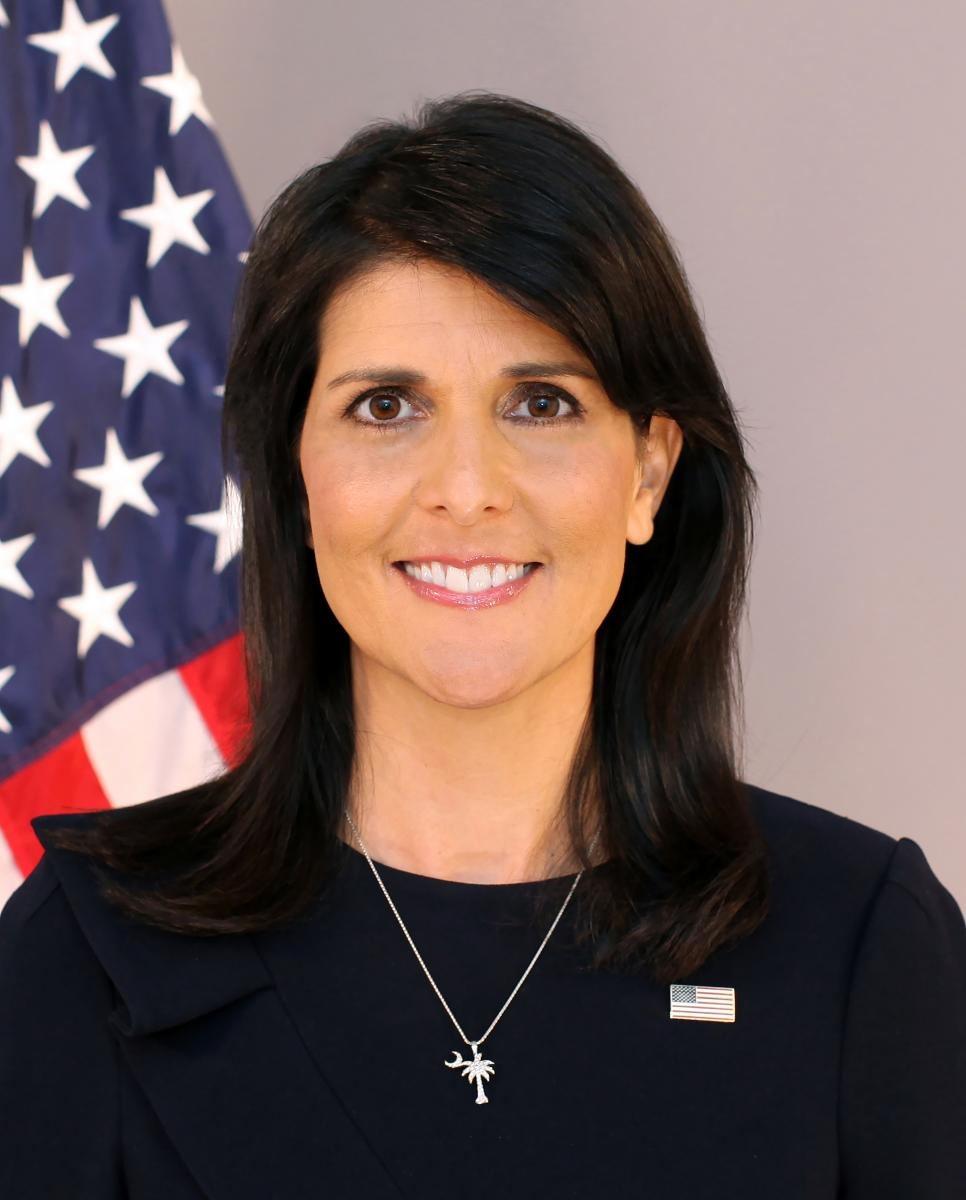
Nikki Haley, United States Ambassador to the United Nations

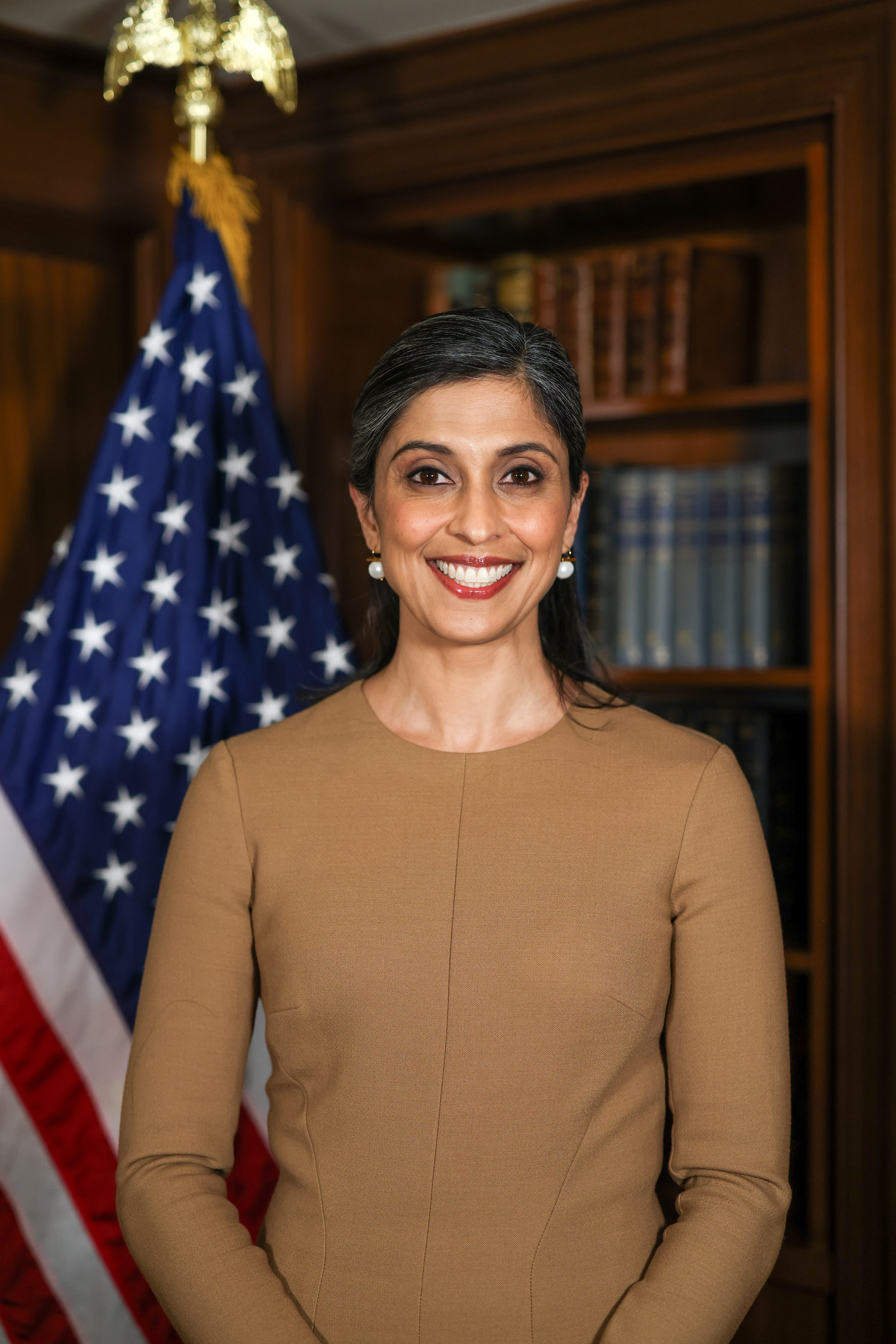
Usha Vance, First Indian American Second Lady Of The United States

- Preeta D. Bansal (b. 1965), member and past chair of the United States Commission on International Religious Freedom; former Solicitor General of New York
- Cathy Bissoon, judge for the United States District Court for the Western District of Pennsylvania (Democratic)
- Nisha Desai Biswal, former Assistant Secretary of State for South and Central Asian Affairs
- Saikat Chakrabarti, chief of staff to Alexandria Ocasio-Cortez, the U.S. representative from New York's 14th congressional district representing parts of The Bronx and Queens in New York City
- Joy Cherian, first Asian head of the Equal Employment Opportunity Commission
- Aneesh Chopra, former (inaugural) Federal Chief Technology Officer of the U.S.
- Har Dayal, founder of the Ghadar Party
- Sabrina De Sousa, ex-Central Intelligence Agency officer; is suing the United States government for diplomatic immunity
- Gurbir Grewal, Bergen County, New Jersey prosecutor, first Sikh American county prosecutor in the U.S.,
- Vanita Gupta, Former Lawyer for American Civil Liberties Union and former United States Associate Attorney General
- Nikki Haley, former U.S. Ambassador to the United Nations; former Governor of South Carolina (Republican)
- Rashad Hussain, U.S. Special Envoy to the Organisation of Islamic Cooperation
- Neel Kashkari, former interim Assistant Secretary of the Treasury for Financial Stability in the United States Department of the Treasury (Republican)
- Neal Katyal, former acting Solicitor General of the United States
- Atul Keshap, former U.S. Ambassador to Sri Lanka and Maldives
- Gopal Khanna, chief information officer of Minnesota
- Narayana Kocherlakota, president of Federal Reserve Bank of Minneapolis
- Kris Kolluri, New Jersey Commissioner of Transportation, Executive Director of NJ Transit
- Saritha Komatireddy (born 1984 or 1985), federal prosecutor, chief of staff of the U.S. Drug Enforcement Administration, Republican nominee for attorney general of New York in the 2026 election.
- Vivek Kundra, Federal Chief Information Officer of the US
- Arun Majumdar, director of the U.S. Department of Energy's Advanced Research Projects Agency-Energy
- Raj Mukherji (b. 1984), Deputy Mayor of Jersey City, New Jersey; candidate for the New Jersey State Legislature
- Ajit Pai, former chairman of the Federal Communications Commission
- Farah Pandith, Special Representative to Muslim Communities for the United States Department of State
- Kash Patel. director of the Federal Bureau of Investigation
- Rachel Paulose, former United States Attorney for the District of Minnesota
- Rajiv Shah (b. 1973), former Under Secretary of Agriculture for Research, Education, and Economics; former Administrator of the United States Agency for International Development; President, Rockefeller Foundation
- Sonal Shah, member of the Obama-Biden Transition Project advisory board
- Islam A. Siddiqui, Chief Agricultural Negotiator in the Office of the United States Trade Representative
- Daleep Singh, former U.S. Deputy National Security Advisor; former Executive Vice President & Head of Markets at New York Fed
- Sabita Singh, first judge of Indian descent in Massachusetts history
- Subra Suresh, director of National Science Foundation
- Vinai Thummalapally (b. 1954), served as U.S. Ambassador to Belize
- Usha Vance, Second Lady of the United States
- Richard Verma (b. 1968), Assistant Secretary for Legislative and Intergovernmental Affairs, at the Department of State and Deputy Secretary of State for Management and Resources at the Department of State
- Surya Yalamanchili, 2010 US Congressional candidate
- Lahori Ram - First Indo-American to be appointed as the Economic Development Commissioner of California.

=== Federal judges ===
- Vince Chhabria, judge of the United States District Court for the Northern District of California
- Nicholas Ranjan, District Judge, United States District Court for the Western District of Pennsylvania
- Neomi Rao, judge of the United States Court of Appeals for the District of Columbia Circuit
- Manish S. Shah, judge of the United States District Court for the Northern District of Illinois
- Indira Talwani, judge of the United States District Court for the District of Massachusetts
- Amul Thapar, judge of the United States Court of Appeals for the Sixth Circuit
- Cathy Bissoon, judge of the United States District Court for the Western District of Pennsylvania
- Satnam Rattu - Indian origin judge of the Superior Court of Sacramento County in California.
- Neetu Badhan Smith - First Sikh woman judge in the United States.
- Amit Mehta - United States District Court for the District of Columbia
- Sri Srinivasan, chief United States circuit judge of the United States Court of Appeals for the District of Columbia Circuit

== Religion and spirituality ==
- Bikram Choudhury (b. 1944), yoga guru and founder of Bikram Yoga
- Eknath Easwaran, spiritual teacher, author, and translator of Indian religious texts such as the Bhagavad Gita and the Upanishads
- Earl K. Fernandes, Bishop-Elect of the Roman Catholic Diocese of Columbus
- Chitrabhanu Jain, founded the Jain Meditation International Center in Manhattan, New York City
- Padmanabh Jaini, scholar of Jainism
- Harbhajan Singh Khalsa, introduced Kundalini Yoga and Sikhism to the US
- Sushil Kumarji, Jain Acharya
- Dipa Ma, yoga teacher
- Eboo Patel, member of the New Faith Advisory Council
- Anantanand Rambachan, Hindu scholar, author, and professor of religion at St. Olaf College
- Joy Alappatt, bishop of the Syro-Malabar Catholic Church
- Prem Rawat, also known as Guru Maharaji Ji, head of the Divine Light Mission and later organizations
- Muzammil Siddiqi, Ph.D., chairman, Fiqh Council of North America
- Yasir Nadeem al Wajidi, Chicago-based Muslim scholar, educationist and author
- Paramahansa Yogananda, yoga guru and founder of Self-Realization Fellowship
- Ravi Zacharias, Christian evangelist and apologist

== Science and technology ==
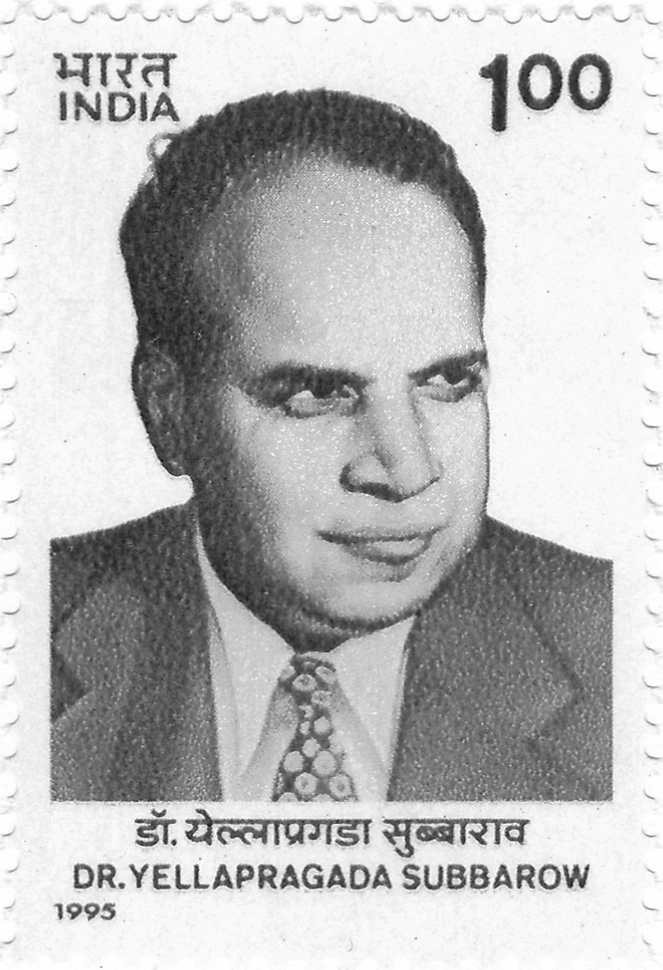
Dr. Subbarow Yellapragada

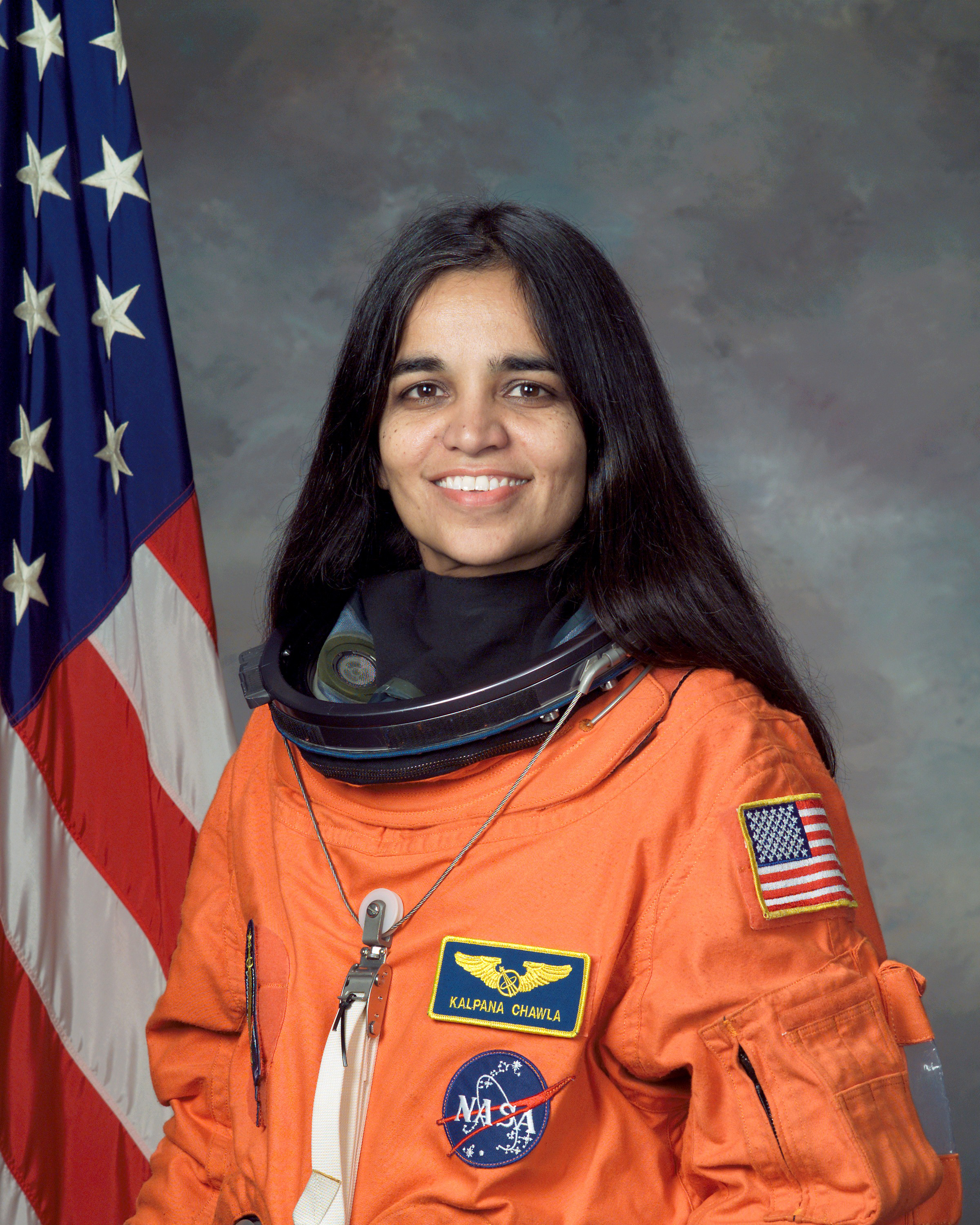
Kalpana Chawla, NASA astronaut, On February 1, 2003, Kalpana Chawla died on the Space Shuttle Columbia

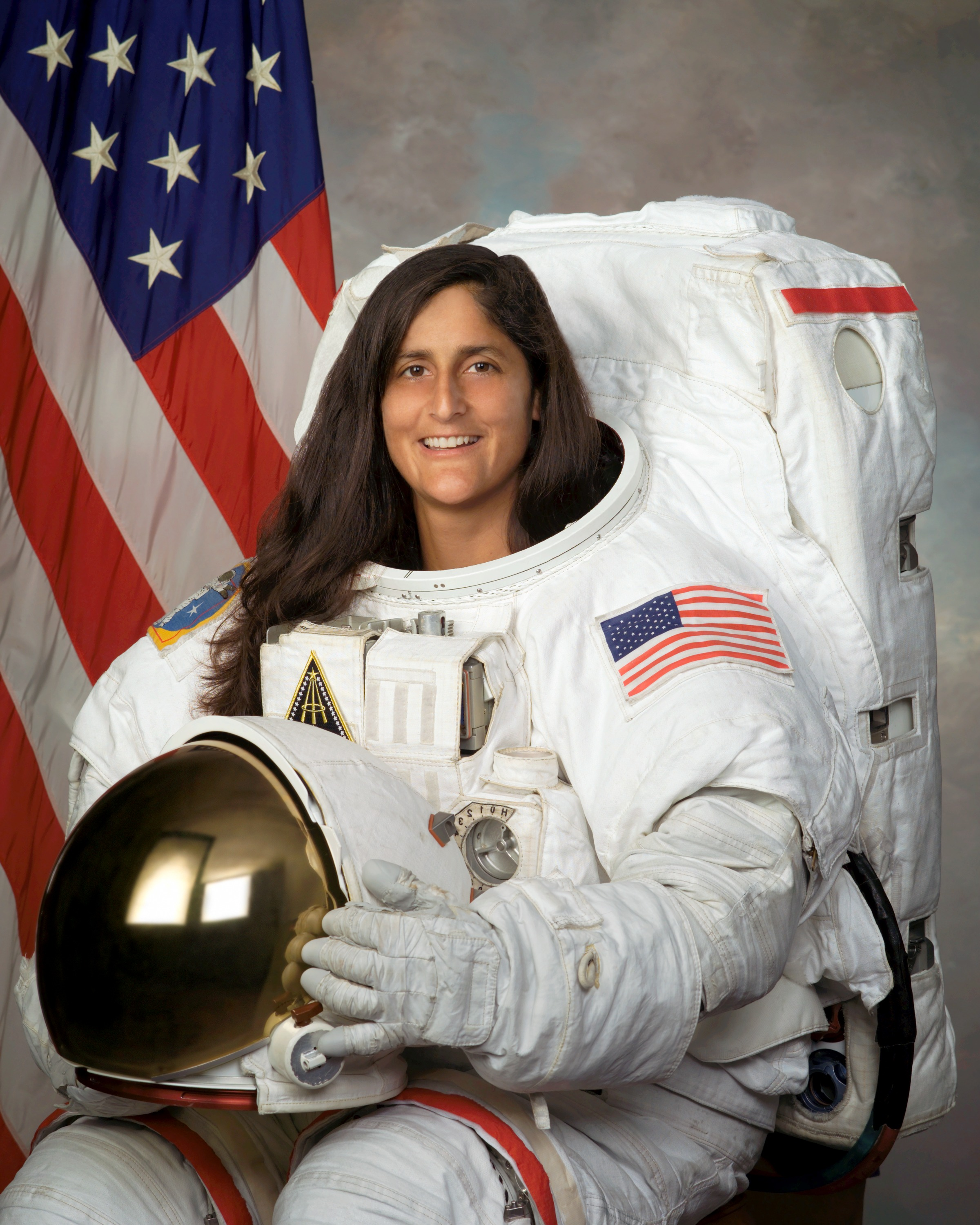
Sunita Williams, NASA astronaut

- Yellapragada Subbarow (1895–1948), pioneering biochemist who discovered ATP, the human body's energy molecule. Discovered methotrexate, an extremely important cancer and immunotherapy drug used to this day. Led team that developed aureomycin, which was a revolutionary antibiotic.
- Ajay Bhatt (b. 1957), co-inventor of the USB; Chief Client Platform Architect at Intel
- Ajit V. Pai, chairman of the United States Federal Communications Commission (FCC)
- Ajit Varki, physician-scientist
- Amar Gopal Bose, PhD in electrical engineering, founder and chairman of Bose Corporation
- A. Hari Reddi, distinguished professor and Lawrence J. Ellison Endowed Chair in Musculoskeletal Molecular Biology at the University of California, Davis
- Bimal Kumar Bose, pioneer in power electronics
- Amit Goyal, scientist and inventor
- Amit Singhal, Google Fellow, the designation the company reserves for its elite master engineers in the area of "ranking algorithm"
- Amitabha Ghosh, the only Asian on NASA's Mars Pathfinder mission
- Anil Dash, blogger and technologist
- Sharat Kumar Roy, geologist and adventurer. A peak on Baffin Island as "Mount Sharat" is named after him by United States Coast and Geodetic Survey
- Anirvan Ghosh, neuroscientist
- Govindjee, biochemist
- Arjun Makhijani, electrical and nuclear engineer; president of the Institute for Energy and Environmental Research
- Arun Netravali, scientist; former president of Bell Labs; former CTO of Lucent; pioneer of digital technology, including HDTV and MPEG4
- Arvind Rajaraman, theoretical physicist and string theorist
- Avtar Saini, co-led the development of the Pentium processor Intel; holds seven patents related to microprocessor design
- Bedabrata Pain, co-inventor of the active pixel sensor
- C. Kumar N. Patel, developed the carbon dioxide laser, used as a cutting tool in surgery and industry
- Deepak Pandya, neuroanatomist
- Arati Prabhakar, former director of the Office of Science and Technology Policy, Science Advisor to the President, director of DARPA, and director of National Institute of Standards and Technology
- Dhairya Dand, inventor and artist
- DJ Patil, Chief Data Scientist of the United States Office of Science and Technology Policy
- Joy A. Thomas, senior data scientist at Google, information theorist and author
- George Sudarshan, physicist, author; first to propose the existence of the tachyon
- Jogesh Pati, theoretical physicist at the University of Maryland, College Park
- Kalpana Chawla, NASA Space Shuttle astronaut, who died in the Columbia Space Shuttle disaster
- Khem Shahani, microbiologist who conducted pioneer research on probiotics; discovered the DDS-1 strain of Lactobacillus acidophilus
- Krishan Sabnani, engineer and senior vice president of the Networking Research Laboratory at Alcatel-Lucent Bell Labs in New Jersey
- Krishna Bharat, principal scientist at Google; created Google News
- Kuzhikalail M. Abraham, pioneer in lithium and lithium-ion battery technologies, professor, Northeastern university, Boston, Massachusetts and president, E-KEM Sciences, Needham, Massachusetts
- Mahadev Satyanarayanan, computer science professor at Carnegie Mellon University; pioneer of research in mobile and pervasive computing
- Mani Lal Bhaumik, scientist, contributor to excimer laser technology, entrepreneur and philanthropist
- Mathukumalli Vidyasagar, control theorist
- Narinder Singh Kapany, physicist, the "father of fiber optics"
- Sachidananda Kangovi, Aerospace Engineer, IT Executive, and Author
- Nalini Nadkarni, ecologist who pioneered the study of Costa Rican rain forest canopies
- Noshir Gowadia, design engineer
- Om Malik, technology journalist and blogger
- Pran Nath, theoretical physicist at Northeastern University
- Pranav Mistry, Sixth Sense Project
- Raj Reddy, founder of the Robotics Institute at Carnegie Mellon University; winner of the Turing Award
- Raja Chari, astronaut chosen for Artemis Moon mission
- Rajeev Motwani, professor, angel investor
- Rajiv Dutta, technology manager
- Rajiv Joshi, Inventor, Vice President of IEEE
- Ramesh K. Agarwal, aviation pioneer; William Palm Professor of Engineering at Washington University
- Ramesh Raskar, Femto-camera inventor, MIT Professor
- Rangaswamy Srinivasan, member of the Inventors' Hall of Fame for pioneering work on excimer laser surgery
- Ruchi Sanghvi, first female engineer of Facebook; former VP of Operations, Dropbox
- Sabeer Bhatia, co-founder of Hotmail
- Samir Mitragotri, professor of chemical engineering and bioengineering at University of California, Santa Barbara
- Sasikanth Manipatruni, Pioneer in the area of Spintronics, Silicon Photonics, Optomechanics and In Memory Computing
- Satya N. Atluri, aerospace and mechanics, Excellence in Aviation Medal, FAA, 1998; Recipient of Padma Bhushan in 2013 in Science & Engineering from the President of India, elected to membership to National Academies of Engineering, USA (1996) and India (1997)
- Salman Khan, founder of Khan Academy
- Sharmila Bhattacharya, head of the Biomodel Performance and Behavior laboratory at NASA Ames Research Center
- VA Shiva Ayyadurai, inventor, scientist, former guest lecturer at MIT
- Siddhartha Mukherjee, scientist, physician, winner of Pulitzer Prize for General Nonfiction
- Siva S. Banda, aerospace engineer and researcher, recipient of a Silver Medal from the Royal Aeronautical Society, a Presidential Rank Award, and elected to membership in the National Academy of Engineering
- Subhash Kak, head of the Computer Science department at Oklahoma State University
- Subrah Iyar, co-founder and CEO of Webex Communications
- Subrata Roy, plasma physicist, professor of aerospace engineering at University of Florida, inventor of the Wingless Electromagnetic Air Vehicle
- Sunita Williams, NASA astronaut
- Shya Chitaley - Paleo botanist
- Swapan Chattopadhyay, particle accelerator physicist
- Swati Mohan, NASA space engineer
- Thomas Anantharaman, computer statistician specializing in Bayesian inference
- Thomas Zacharia, computational scientist
- V. Mohan Reddy, pediatric cardiothoracic surgeon at Stanford
- Vamsi Mootha, physician-scientist and computational biologist
- Suchir Balaji, computer scientist turned whistleblower who worked for OpenAI.
- Vic Gundotra, former senior vice president, Engineering for Google
- Vijay Raghunath Pandharipande, physicist
- Vineeta Rastogi, public health worker
- Sirisha Bandla, space engineer
- Asim Duttaroy, Medical Scientist

=== Medicine ===
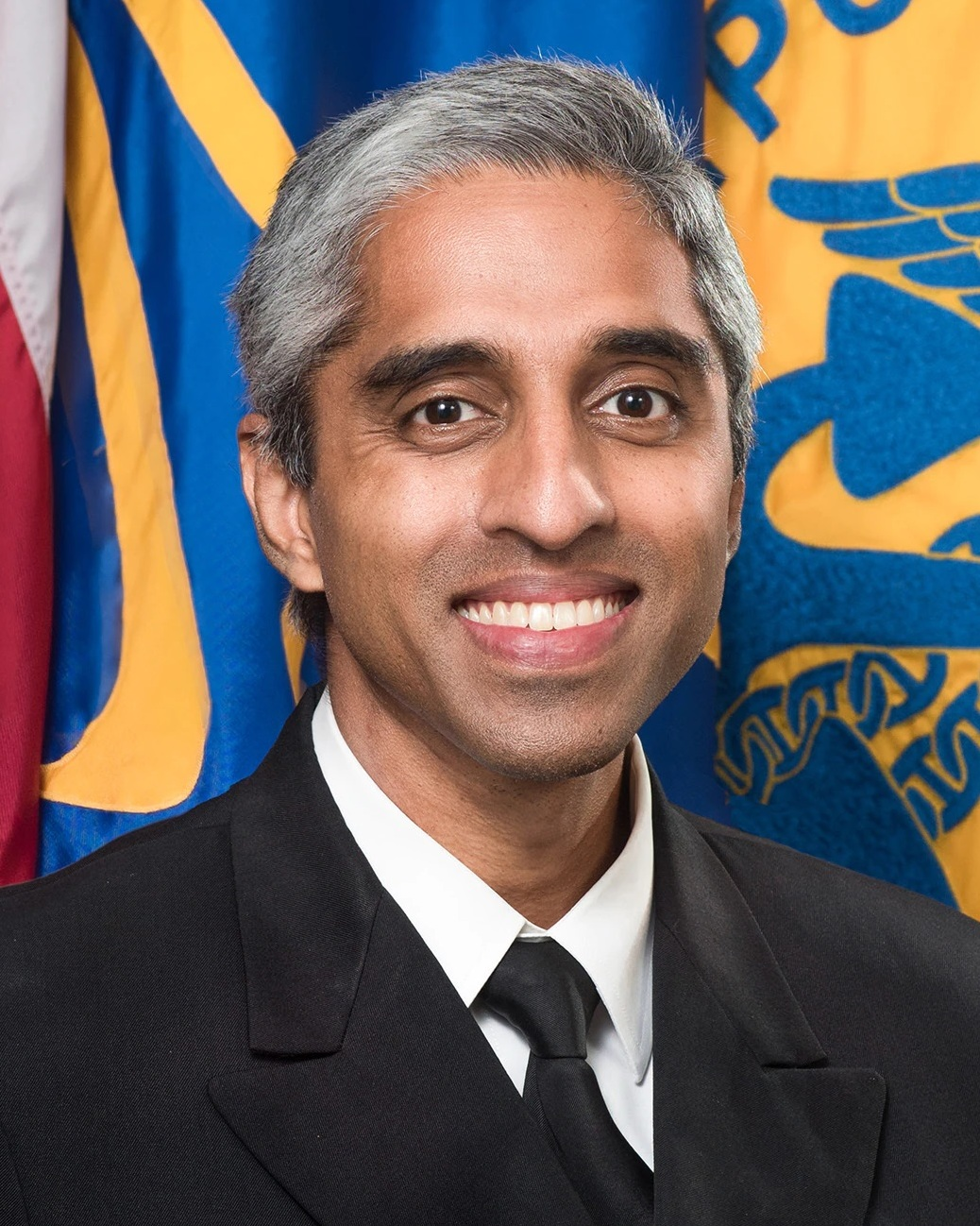
Vivek Murthy, Surgeon General of U.S.; former vice admiral of U.S. Health Corps

- Amit Patel, cardiovascular surgeon and stem cell researcher; first person to inject stem cells directly into the heart
- Anita Goel, Harvard-MIT physicist, physician; expert in nanobiophysics and nanotechnology; chairman and CEO of Nanobiosym; inventor of Gene-RADAR technology
- Ashutosh Tewari, professor of urology at New York Presbyterian Hospital; prostate cancer surgeon
- Atul Gawande, general and endocrine surgeon, professor, medical author, and National Book Award finalist
- Balamurali Ambati, world's youngest doctor, at age 17
- Deepak Chopra, alternative medicine advocate, author and public speaker
- E. Premkumar Reddy, oncologist; director of Fels institute of cancer research and molecular biology at Temple University
- Harvinder Sahota, cardiologist; inventor of the FDA-approved perfusion balloon angioplasty; holds patents of 24 other medical inventions
- Inder Verma, Professor of Molecular Biology in the Laboratory of Genetics at Salk Institute for Biological Studies and University of California, San Diego
- Joia Mukherjee, associate professor with the Division of Global Health Equity at the Brigham and Women's Hospital and the Department of Global Health and Social Medicine at Harvard Medical School
- Paul Antony, MD, MPH, chief medical officer for the Pharmaceutical Research and Manufacturers of America (PhRMA)
- Ragavendra R. Baliga, FACC, FACP, FRCP (Edin), Professor of Medicine at; Ohio State University College of Medicine
- Sangeeta Bhatia, Harvard-MIT doctor and scientist; engineer of artificial liver cells
- Sanjay Gupta, neurosurgeon; CNN chief medical correspondent;
- Vivek Murthy (b. 1977), 19th and former Surgeon General of the United States; former vice admiral of U.S. Public Health Service Commissioned Officer Corps
- Kiran C Patel (b. 1949), cardiologist, philanthropist, serial entrepreneur, and hotelier
- Asim Duttaroy, Medical Scientist
- Deborah Persaud (b. 1960), virologist
- Alok Kanojia, psychiatrist and mental health coach

== Sports ==
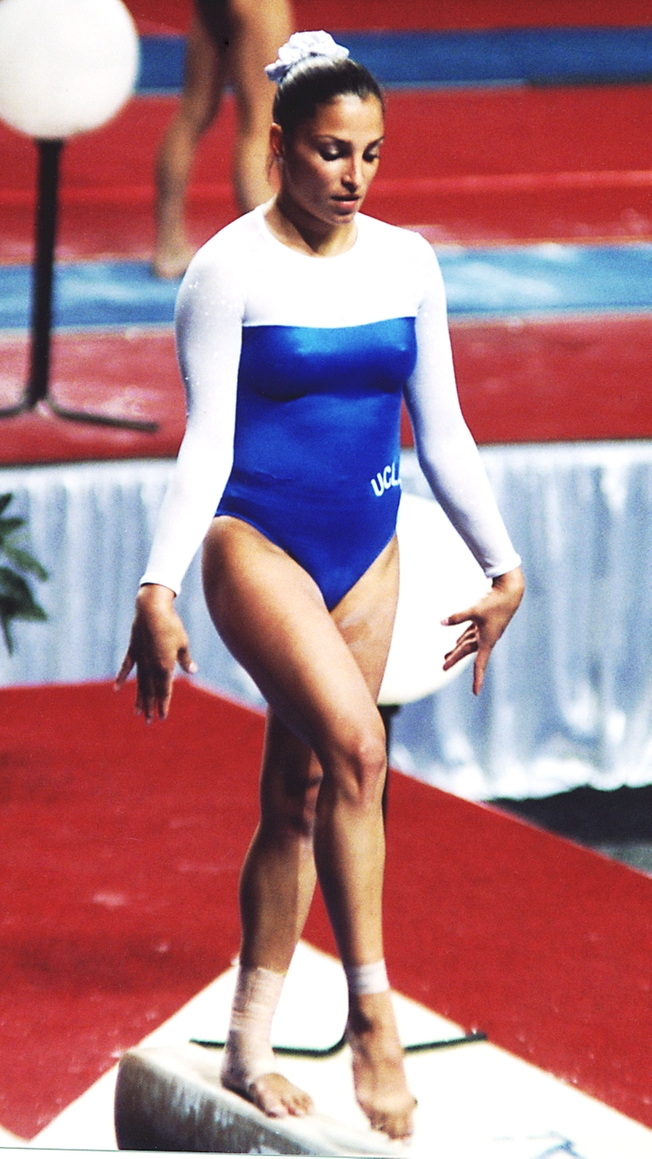
Mohini Bhardwaj, 2004 Summer Olympics medalist in gymnastics

- Adeel Alam, professional wrestler best known ring name Mustafa Ali (Indian mother)
- Prakash Amritraj (b. 1983), tennis player (born in the US)
- Stephen Amritraj (b. 1984), tennis player
- Sanjay Beach (b. 1966), former National Football League wide receiver; played for the San Francisco 49ers and the Green Bay Packers
- Mohini Bhardwaj, second Indian American Olympic medalist, 2004 Summer Olympics silver medalist in gymnastics
- Vinay Bhat, chess grandmaster
- Raj Bhavsar, third Indian American Olympic medalist, 2008 Summer Olympics bronze medalist in the team gymnastics competition
- Shaun Bridgmohan, jockey
- Unmukt Chand, cricketer
- Ashish Chattha, soccer player
- Brandon Chillar, NFL player, linebacker for the Green Bay Packers (father of Indian descent)
- Carlos Cordeiro, President of the United States Soccer Federation
- Sean Desai (b. 1983), NFL coach and defensive coordinator for the Chicago Bears
- Jignesh Desai, cricketer
- Sonjay Dutt, TNA pro wrestler
- The Great Khali, WWE pro wrestler
- Alexi Grewal, first Indian American to win an Olympic medal, gold medalist in 1984 Summer Olympics in cycling
- Sunil Gulati, former President of the United States Soccer Federation
- Nezam Hafiz, cricketer and victim of the September 11 attacks
- Amjad Khan, cricketer
- Ibrahim Khaleel, cricketer
- Noshtush Kenjige, cricketer
- Thirunavukkarasu Kumaran, cricketer
- Iris Kyle, professional bodybuilder
- Anil Lashkari, cricketer
- Sanjay Lal, wide receivers coach for the Dallas Cowboys
- Rajiv Maragh, jockey
- Aditya Mishra, cricketer
- Mike Mohamed, former NFL player of Punjabi Mexican American descent
- Sushil Nadkarni, American cricketer
- Arjun Nimmala, baseball player
- Ami Parekh, figure skater
- Japen Patel, cricketer
- Monank Patel, USA cricket captain
- Mrunal Patel, cricketer
- Raj Patel, golfer
- Sagar Patel, cricketer
- Smit Patel, cricketer
- Timil Patel, cricketer
- Laxmi Poruri, tennis player
- Tara Prasad, figure skater
- Abhimanyu Rajp, cricketer
- Rajeev Ram, tennis player
- Annand Mahendra "Victor" Ramdin, professional poker player and philanthropist
- Sunitha Rao, tennis player
- Srini Santhanam, cricketer
- Jessy Singh, cricketer
- Saurabh Netravalkar, USA cricket captain
- Jaskaran Malhotra, cricketer
- Milind Kumar, cricketer
- Harmeet Singh, cricketer
- Abhimanyu Mishra, chess grandmaster
- Kanak Jha, Table Tennis player
- Akshay Bhatia, golfer
- Sahith Theegala, golfer
- Neha Uberoi, tennis player
- Shikha Uberoi, tennis player
- Roopa Unnikrishnan, sports shooter and innovation consultant
- Shiva Vashishat, cricketer

== See also ==
- List of Indo-Caribbean Americans
- List of Gujarati Americans
- List of Malayali Americans
- List of Telugu Americans
- List of Tamil Americans
- List of Sindhi Americans
- List of Bengali Americans
- List of Punjabi Americans
- List of Punjabi Mexican Americans
- Non-resident Indian and Person of Indian Origin
- India–United States relations
- Deportation of Indian nationals under Donald Trump
