= Sukhbir (writer) =

Indian writer (1925–2012)

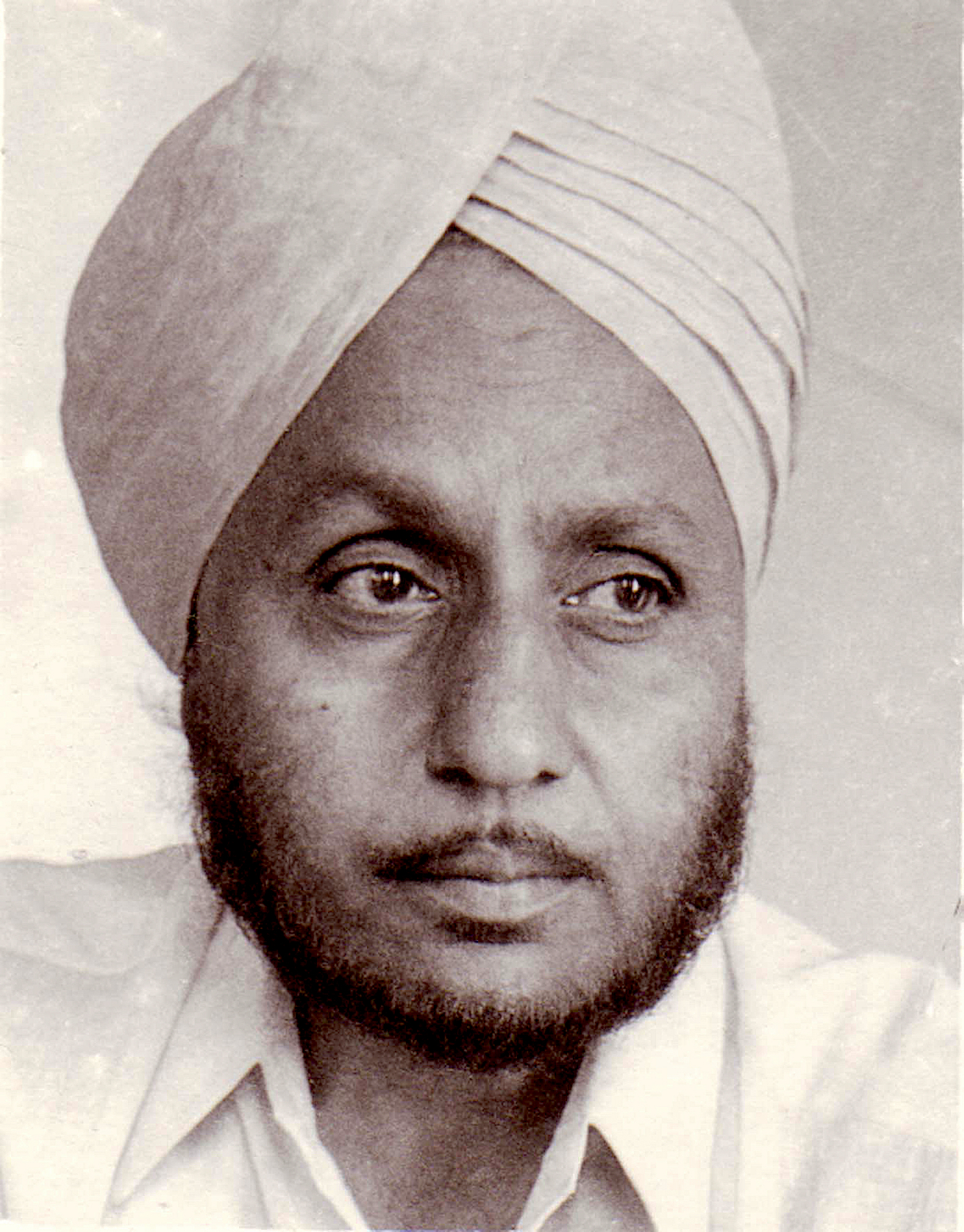
- Sukhbir at Chandigarh in 1976
- Born: Balbir Singh; 9 July 1925; Mumbai, India
- Died: 22 February 2012 (aged 86)
- Occupations: Novelist, poet, short story writer, essayist
- Writing career
- Genres: Novel, poetry, short story
- Notable works: Raat da Chehra (The Face of Night) (novel); Sarkaan te Kamre (Streets and Rooms) (novel) "Ruki Hoi Raat (The Suspended Night)" (short story); Nain Naksh (The Features) (poetry)

Sukhbir (9 July 1925 – 22 February 2012), alias Balbir Singh, was a Punjabi novelist, short-story writer, poet and essayist. He wrote and published for fifty years. He wrote seven novels, 11 short story collections, and five poetry collections, and made many translations of world literature, essays, letters and book reviews.

== Personal life ==
Sukhbir alias Balbir Singh was born on 9 July 1925 to S. Mansha Singh and Smt. Shiv Kaur in Mumbai, India. He was the eldest of his siblings, who included three brothers and three sisters. He adopted the pen name Sukhbir after partition, when he was arrested during the student unrest in Mumbai in 1950. He had already started publishing in literary magazines and was a known name as a budding writer. While he was in jail in Nasik, one of his editor friends in whose magazine his poems were to be published, changed his name to Sukhbir, to avoid the authorities' attention. Subsequently, Sukhbir chose to retain this as his pen name, as many other writers with the name of Balbir Singh had sprung up by then and were cashing in on his established name.

Sukhbir with Jasbir Kaur

His father, S. Mansha Singh, was a civil engineer in Indian Railways. He was a religious man, but with a rational and liberal attitude. He was the first person to open Sukhbir up to rational interpretation of his own religion, and subsequently, to everything in life. He can safely be called the first influence in Sukhbir's life, which he remained throughout.

Sukhbir's early schooling was in his native village Beerampur in Punjab. His father being in the Railways, the family was always on the move. When he was in the 6th standard, the family shifted to Mumbai. He did his subsequent schooling in Podar High School, Mumbai. He completed his graduation from Khalsa College, Mumbai, after which he moved to Khalsa College, Amritsar to pursue his master's in Punjabi in 1958, which earned him the rank of university topper and a gold medal. As much as he wanted to, he could not pursue a post-graduate degree in psychology.

He started publishing in the leading Punjabi journal of the time, Preet Lari, edited by Gurbaksh Singh Preetlari. Simultaneously, he started taking an interest in the activities of Communist Party of India, and had great regard for its founder, Puran Chand Joshi. This interest did not last long as he soon became disillusioned with the political tactics that led to the severe humiliation and expulsion of Joshi from the party. He reflected hard on the communist ideology and chose to step aside to find his own way, while remaining committed to the Marxist thought and philosophy.

Before taking up writing as a full-time career, Sukhbir was an advertisement-writer and college lecturer to earn his livelihood. By this time, he had married Jasbir Kaur. Soon thereafter, he left his job as a lecturer at Khalsa College, Mumbai to take up writing as a full-time career, which was unusual and a risky proposition at the time considering the fate of writers in the country.

Sukhbir suffered multiple complications after severe cardiac arrest and died on 22 February 2012.

== Influences ==
Sukhbir's major literary influences were John Steinbeck, Anton Chekhov, Irving Stone, Sigmund Freud, T. S. Eliot, Pablo Neruda, Sardar Jafri, Krishan Chander, and Rajinder Singh Bedi.

He was greatly influenced by the philosophy of Gautama Buddha and Portuguese philosopher Baruch Spinoza. His writings depicted the inner travails of the human mind as a significant aspect of the lives of the characters, and these thinkers dwelt upon the ambiguous nature of mental processes. He also studied the works of Sigmund Freud and Carl Jung to understand the inner workings of the mind and add psychological dimensions to the characters of his novels and short stories. Karl Marx's life and works also had a lasting influence on him, as Sukhbir identified with his empathy and concern for the underprivileged in society.

Sukhbir was an avid reader of biographies of great writers and other personalities because he believed that an understanding and appreciation of their work is not complete unless one has studied the background contexts in which they lived and worked.

== Writing style ==
Sukhbir is considered the pioneer of stream-of-consciousness writing in Punjabi. His novel Raat da Chehra (The Face of Night) published in 1961 is a stream-of-consciousness novel depicting the story spanned over one night. Even in his short stories, he pioneered the stream-of-consciousness genre of writing. A noted example is the story "Ruki Hoyi Raat (The Suspended Night)" in which the narrator in his reminiscences is recalling his long lost childhood friend who has become a rebel and is evading the repressive authorities.

Sukhbir brought a new sensibility to the Punjabi novel by introducing lyrical beauty in prose and distributing his narrative material into pictorial scenes and adding dimensions to characters through exchange of dialogue. Sukhbir being essentially a poet wanted his prose to vie with poetry for the virtues of precision, harmony and rhythm.

In Sukhbir's writings, progressive, psychological and artistic strands are inter twined. His realistic literary vision got strength from the pragmatic approach of Marxism on the one hand and depths of psychology and intricacies of arts on the other.

Sukhbir had a good appreciation of painting and he occasionally did sketches. A painter's perspective is seen in all his writings. The poems in Nain Naksh (The Features) are written specifically in techniques of modern painting like Portrait, Nude, Collage, Still Life, Landscape, Self-Portrait, etc. This is a unique experiment in Punjabi literature. Observing the environs and its life from the perspective of a painter, he brought in a new approach in all three genres – poetry, short story and novel.

Sukhbir's self-portrait which is part of the poetry collection Nain Naksh is reproduced.

ਸੁਖਬੀਰ : ਸੇਲ੍ਫ ਪੋਰਟ੍ਰੇਟ

ਸੁਪਨਕਾਰ ਹਾਂ ਭਾਵੇਂ
ਆਮ ਜਿਹੀ ਮਿੱਟੀ ਹਾਂ ਮੈਂ ਖਰਵੀ ਤੇ ਤਗੜੀ
ਚਾਨਣ ਨਾਲ ਜੋ ਗੁੰਨ੍ਹੀ ਗਈ ਏ

ਮਿੱਟੀ ਜਿਸ ਦੇ ਸਵਾਦ ਅਨੇਕਾਂ
ਮਿੱਟੀ ਜਿਸ ਦੇ ਤੇਲ 'ਚ ਬੱਤੀ ਜਗਦੀ
ਮਿੱਟੀ ਜਿਸ ਵਿਚ ਦਰਦ ਦੀਆਂ ਤ੍ਰਾਟਾਂ ਸੁਪਨੇ ਤੇ ਰੰਗ ਹਨ

ਆਮ ਜਿਹਾ ਇਕ ਚਿਹਰਾ
ਕਿੰਨੀਆਂ ਹੀ ਚਿਹਰਿਆਂ ਦੇ ਨਕਸ਼ਾਂ ਦੀਆਂ ਲਕੀਰਾਂ
ਨਕਸ਼ ਜੋ ਝਖੜਾਂ ਦੇ ਵਿਚ ਤਰਾਸ਼ੇ ਗਏ ਹਨ
ਨਕਸ਼ ਜਿਨ੍ਹਾਂ ਨੇ
ਭੁੱਖਾਂ ਤ੍ਰੇਹਾ ਤ੍ਰਿਪਤੀਆਂ 'ਚੋ ਲੰਘ ਸੁਪਨਿਆਂ ਦਾ ਤਾਅ ਖਾਧਾ

ਇਹ ਮੇਰਾ ਚਿਹਰਾ ਨਹੀਂ
ਭਾਵੇਂ ਇਸ 'ਤੇ ਮੇਰੀਆਂ ਦੋ ਅੱਖਾਂ ਹਨ
ਤੇ ਉਨਹਾਂ ਅੱਖਾਂ ਵਿਚ
ਮੇਰੀ ਰੁਹ ਦਾ ਅਤੇ ਕਿਤਾਬਾਂ ਦਾ ਚਾਨਣ ਏ

ਇਕ ਚਿਹਰਾ ਜੋ ਕਿਸੇ ਵੀ ਬੰਦੇ ਦਾ ਚਿਹਰਾ ਏ
ਤਾਹੀਂ ਹਰ ਇਕ ਚਿਹਰਾ ਮੈਂਨੁ ਭਾਉਂਦਾ
ਉਸ ਵਿਚ ਮੈਂ ਆਪਣੇ ਚਿਹਰੇ ਦਾ ਹਰਖ ਸੋਗ ਹਾਂ ਤੱਕਦਾ

ਅਜੇ ਤਾਂ ਮੇਰਾ ਚਿਹਰਾ
ਮਿੱਟੀ ਵਿਚੋਂ ਲੰਘ ਰਿਹਾ ਏ ਧੂੜਾਂ ਫੱਕਦਾ
ਜਹਿਰ ਦਾ ਕੋੜਾ ਸਵਾਦ ਪਚਾਉਂਦਾ
ਭਾਵੇਂ ਇਸ ਨੇ ਕਦੇ ਸੀ ਅਮ੍ਰਿਤ ਪੀਤਾ
ਤਾਂਹੀ ਤਾਂ ਇਹ ਅੱਜ ਤਾਈਂ ਜਿਉਂਦਾ ਏ

ਸੁਪਨੇ ਸਿਰਜਦਾਂ ਹਾਂ ਮੈਂ
ਉਂਜ ਤਾਂ ਆਮ ਜਿਹੀ ਮਿੱਟੀ ਹਾਂ
ਆਦਿ ਕਾਲ ਦੇ ਚਾਨਣ ਨਾਲ ਜੋ ਗੁੰਨ੍ਹੀ ਗਈ ਏ I

== Literary career ==
Sukhbir's first short story collection Dubda-Charda Suraj (Setting and Rising Sun) was published in 1957. The next year saw his collection of poems in print – Pairhan (The Footprints). His first novel Kach Da Shehar (The Crystal City) was published in 1960. By then, he had already become a renowned name, publishing in leading literary journals like Preet Larhi and Aarsi. His works in Hindi were also published in magazines like Navneet, Kadambari, Parag, Sarika, and Dharamyug. He published regularly in the Times of India and Navbharat Times. In the November 1973 issue of Illustrated Weekly of India, the literary editor Nissim Ezekiel gave him an entire page for his poems – a rare honour at that time for a poet.

In the early 1960s, he took up the translation of Russian works, funded by the Russian government. His most acclaimed translation is Leo Tolstoy's War and Peace in Punjabi as Jang te Aman. Other translations include short stories, plays and letters of Maxim Gorky, Mikhail Sholokhov's And Quiet Flows the Don, Askad Mukhtar's Sisters (Bhaina), and Konstantin Paustovsky's The Golden Rose (Sunehra Gulab).

The Russian government used to honour the translators who translated important Russian works into native languages of India with an award and a short-period travel to Russia. However, the corrupt bureaucracy led to another writer getting the award that year, although Sukhbir's translation of War and Peace in Punjabi was published that year. The following year the awards were terminated.

One of his contributions is the poetic character-sketches of illustrious personalities of Punjab like First Guru of Sikhs Guru Nanak, Gurbaksh Singh Preetlari, writer Nanak Singh, Mohan Singh, Amrita Pritam, Kartar Singh Duggal, Rajinder Singh Bedi, Balraj Sahni, Pyara Singh Sehrai, and Santokh Singh Dheer, which were published in the leading Punjabi monthly Dharti Da Suraj in February–April 2010. These were also published in the poetry collection Lafz te Leekan (Words and Lines) in 1989.

He also wrote memoirs of literary personalities like Devinder Satyarthi.

He did book reviews as well, the latest being the poetry collection Rishta by noted painter Imroz.

Sukhbir wrote seven novels, 11 short story collections, and seven poetry collections. He published in Punjabi journals including Aarsi (now defunct), Nagmani (now defunct), Preet Lari, Dharti Da Suraj, and Akhar, and all the Punjabi newspapers like Punjabi Tribune, Navan Zamana, and Desh Sewak. He started the trend of financial remuneration for his writings and established himself as the first and only full-time freelance writer in Punjabi literature.

Sukhbir believed letters to be a great source of information about a person's beliefs and values over time. He wrote various letters and articles on literary, political and social issues engaging in dialogue with truth, honesty, sympathy and reason. In this way he created a distinct genre in Punjabi literature.

Being a reclusive and self-effacing person, Sukhbir stayed away from the literary cliques who controlled and ran literary circles, academies and universities in Punjab. He believed that awards and recognitions are given for extraneous considerations and not for literary merit or contributions. He decided not to accept any awards, nor attend any conferences and seminars for this reason.

== Acclaim ==
Sukhbir's most acclaimed novel is Sarkaan Te Kamre (Streets and Rooms), dealing with the metropolitan life of Mumbai, which was published in 1964. It depicts the trials and tribulations of ambitious young people in the dream city of Mumbai. The title of the novel is poignantly evocative, telling the sad plight of dwellers of a metropolis who have no homes to live in, but have streets for the day and shabby rooms for the night. The novel was included in the post-graduate curriculum of Punjabi University, Patiala.

His novel Adde-Paune (The Fragmented Ones) is a powerful portrayal of fragmented personalities in modern society. It is a bold theme in Punjabi literature to depict a gay hero in the work of fiction.

== Literary works ==
=== Novels ===
- Kach da Shehar (The Crystal City), 1960
- Raat da Chehra (The Face of Night), 1961
- Paani te Pull (Water and the Bridge), 1962
- Gardish (The Wandering), 1962
- Sarkaan te Kamre (Streets and Rooms), 1964
- Tutti Hoi Kari (The Broken Link), 1965
- Adde-Paune (The Fragmented Ones), 1970

=== Story collections ===
- Dubda Charda Suraj (The Setting and Rising Sun), 1957
- Miti te Manukh (Earth and the Man), 1973
- Kaliya-kaariya (The Lonely Ones), 1973
- Baari Vichla Suraj (Sun in the Window), 1975
- Pani di Pari (The Water Fairy), 1980
- Ikai (The Unit), 1987
- Lori (The Lullaby), 1988
- Manukh te Jarhaan (Man and the Roots), 1988
- Sajje-Khabbe (Left and Right), 1989
- Ruki Hoi Raat (The Suspended Night), 2000
- Ik Hor Chardiwari (One More Fence), 2004
- Sukhbir Diyan Chonviyan Kahaniya (Selected Stories of Sukhbir), 2014
- Raat se Raat tak (Night to Night), 2015

=== Poetry collections ===
- Pairhan (The Footprints), 1964
- Nain Naksh (The Features), 1964
- Akhaan Waali Raat (A Night with Eyes), 1973
- Lafz te Leeka (The Words and the Lines), 1989
- Lahoo Libre Pair (The Blood-Stained Feet), 1992
- Sirnavan Samunder Da (The Address of the Sea), 2012
- Ibadatgahan (Places of Worship), 2013
- Vann-Trinn (Forest and Foliage), 2016

=== Translations ===
- Leo Tolstoy – Jung te Aman (War and Peace)
- Maxim Gorky – Gorky Dia Kahaniyan (The Stories of Gorky), Gorky de Panj Natak (Five Plays of Gorky), Italy Dia Kahania (The Stories of Italy), Gorky de Khat (The Letters of Gorky)
- Mikhail Sholokhov – Te Don Vehnda Reha (And Quiet Flows the Don), Navi Dharti Nave Siyad (Virgin Soil Upturned), Sholokhov Dia Kahania (The Stories of Sholokhov)
- Konstantin Paustovsky – Sunehra Gulab (The Golden Rose),Samay De Khambh ()
- Nikolai Ostrovsky – Soorme Di Sirajana (How The Steel Was Tempered)
- Vilis Latsis – Mahigir (The Son of the Fisherman)
- Askad Mukhtar – Bhaina (Sisters)

== Books on Sukhbir ==
- Sukhbir Da Galap by Dr. Harvinder Kaur Chahal. Unistar Books Pvt. Ltd., Chandigarh, 2004, 81-7142-034-6
- Sukhbir: Antar-Jhaat by Dr. Chander Mohan, Chetna Parkashan, Ludhiana, Punjab, 2005, ISBN 81-7883-205-4
- Sukhbir: Kaav Nuhar by Dr. Chander Mohan, Ravi Sahit Prakashan, Amritsar, 2010, ISBN 81-7143-516-5
- Sukhbir: Kalam te Naksh by Dr. Chander Mohan, Ravi Sahit Prakashan, Amritsar, 2012
- Sukhbir: Simriti Granth Edited by Dr. Chander Mohan, Navyug Publishers, New Delhi, 2015
