= A. K. Mozumdar =

Indian American spiritual writer and teacher

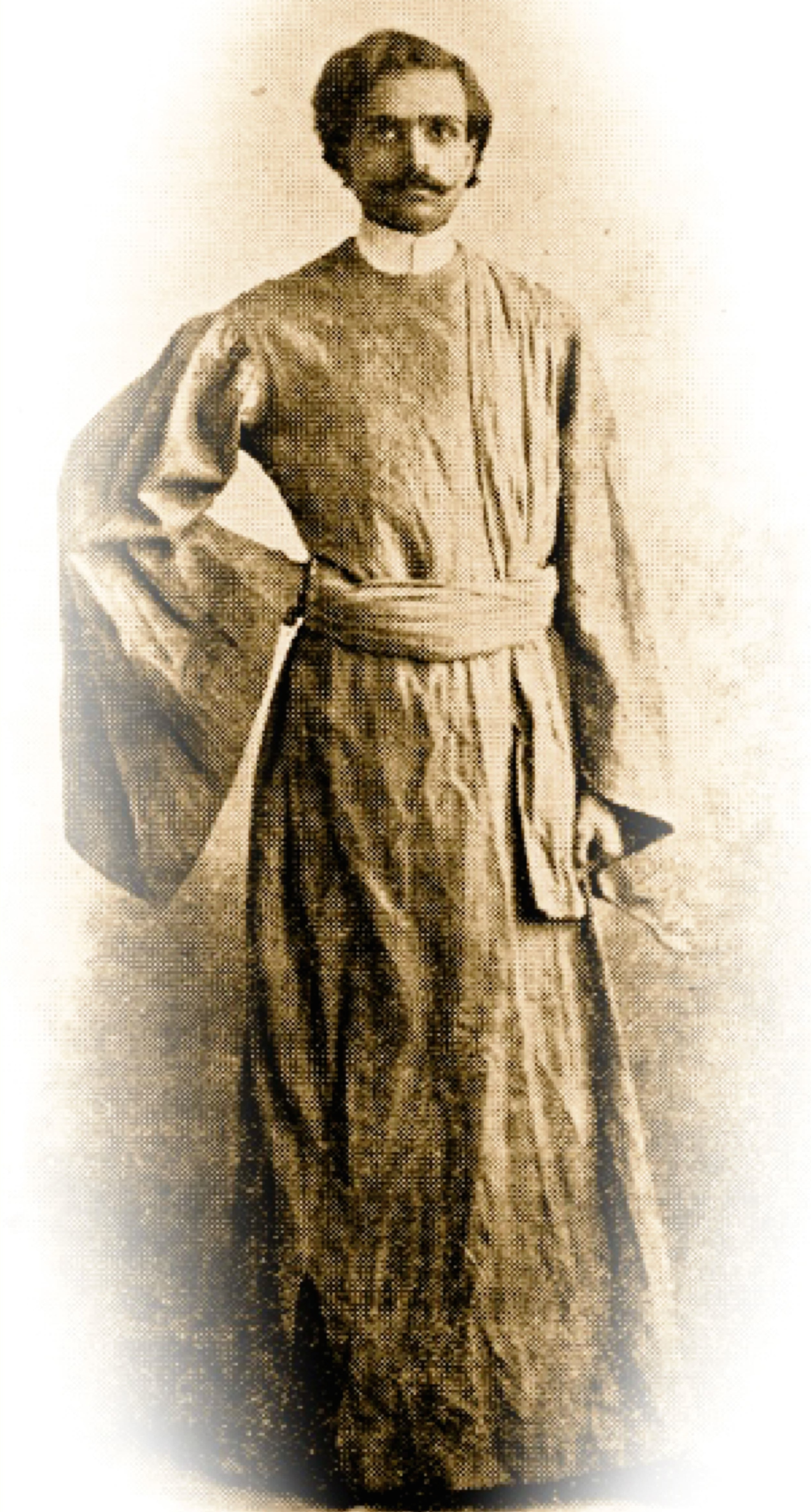
- Portrait of A.K. Mozumdar in 1908
- Born: July 15, 1881; Kolkata, India
- Died: March 9, 1953 (aged 71); San Diego, California, US
- Occupations: minister and author
- Known for: Universal Truth Teachings

Akhay Kumar Mozumdar (July 15, 1881 – March 9, 1953) was an Indian American spiritual writer and teacher associated with the New Thought Movement in the United States. He became a naturalized American in 1913 and in 1923, following United States v. Bhagat Singh Thind, Mozumdar was the first Indian after Bhagat Singh Thind to have his United States citizenship taken away.

== Biography ==
The son of an attorney, Mozumdar was born in a small village about twenty miles north of Calcutta, India. He was the youngest child, with eight older brothers and one sister. The Mozumdars were a high caste family. Mozumdar's mother was very devout and named him Akhay Kumar, meaning "Son of God." Mozumdar was a teacher, lecturer, and writer of the New Thought Movement in the United States during the first half of 20th century. He exhibited a deep knowledge of God and taught what he called, the "Creative Principle." After leaving his family home, he spent time traveling throughout India, and said that he traveled to Bethlehem to learn about Christianity. He spent several years in China and Japan and decided to teach in America.

Mozumdar immigrated to the United States, arriving in Seattle, Washington, in 1904. In 1905 Jennie and Charles Clark, leaders in Seattle's Queen City Theosophical Society, reported in the Theosophical Quarterly Magazine that Mozumdar, 'a Hindu Brother ... has spoken for us for several weeks to full houses.' The Clarks wrote that Mozumdar "calls his teachings 'universal truth.

Mozumdar delivered lectures primarily in Washington, Oregon, and California, based on his teachings that combined Christianity, Hinduism which he referred to as "Christian yoga."

== United States immigration law ==
In 1913, Mozumdar became a US citizen after having convinced the Spokane district judge that he was in fact Caucasian and thereby met the requirements of naturalization law then restricting citizenship to "free white persons." On February 5, 1917, the United States Congress passed the Immigration Act of 1917 also known as the Asiatic Barred Zone Act. Along with many other undesirables it banned Asians from immigrating to the United States.

Ten years after being granted citizenship, however, as a result of the US Supreme Court decision in United States v. Bhagat Singh Thind, stipulating that no person of East Indian origin could become a naturalized United States citizen, Mozumdar's citizenship was revoked. A decision on his appeal to the Ninth Circuit Court of Appeals upheld the revocation. The Luce–Celler Act of 1946 provided a quota of 100 East Indians to immigrate into the US and permitted East Indians to apply for and be granted citizenship. Mozumdar reapplied under the new statute and was granted US citizenship in 1950. He remained in the United States until his death in San Diego in 1953, and he was buried at Forest Lawn Memorial Park in Glendale, California. Mozumdar was very close to several leaders in the International New Thought Alliance. Reverend Ernest Holmes, an American spiritual writer, teacher and founder of a Spiritual movement known as Religious Science, and author of "Science of Mind" was a close friend and admirer. Holmes officiated at Mozumdar's large and well attended memorial service.

== Major works ==
- The Triumphant Spirit
- The Conquering Man (also translated into Swedish by Eric O. G. Olson, Den segrande människan)
- The Mystery of the Kingdom
- The Commanding Life
- Christ on the Road of Today
- Key to the New Messianic World Message
- Christ Speaketh
- Today and Tomorrow
- Open Door to Heaven
- The Life and the Way

== See also ==
- Church of Divine Science
- Ernest Holmes
- Religious Science
