= Sakharam Ganesh Pandit =

Indian American civil rights lawyer

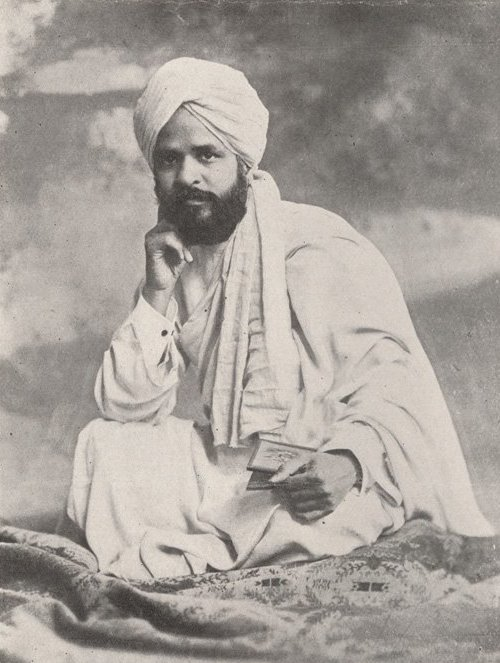
- S. G. Pandit c. 1910
- Born: 1875; Ahmedabad, Bombay Presidency, British India (present-day Gujarat, India)
- Died: August 7, 1959 (aged 83–84); Los Angeles, California, U.S.
- Citizenship: British Indian, American (1914)
- Occupation: Lawyer
- Known for: United States v. Bhagat Singh Thind
- Spouse: Lillian Stringer (m. 1920)

Sakharam Ganesh Pandit (1875–1959), also known as S. G. Pandit, was an Indian American lawyer and civil rights activist. Pandit immigrated to the United States in 1906 and became a citizen in 1914. In 1923, he represented Bhagat Singh Thind in the Supreme Court case United States v. Bhagat Singh Thind; the Court ruled against Thind and found that Indians were ineligible for United States citizenship. However, Pandit successfully fought against a subsequent attempt to remove his own citizenship, and the federal government thereafter gave up its efforts to denaturalize Indian Americans. Pandit died in Los Angeles in 1959.

== Early life and immigration to the United States ==
Born in Ahmedabad, British India to a Gujarati Brahmin family, Pandit received both an undergraduate and a doctoral degree from universities in India. Moving to the United States in 1906, Pandit initially made a living as a spiritual teacher in the tradition of Swami Vivekenanda, lecturing on topics such as the esoteric meanings of the life of Jesus. A 1910 pamphlet for a Kilbourn, Wisconsin class entitled "The Fourth Dimension or a Larger World", for example, depicts him against a mystical backdrop.

=== American citizenship ===
Pandit applied to become a United States citizen as a resident of California in 1914. The Bureau of Naturalization, charged with implementing the immigration laws of the time, argued that Pandit could not become a citizen as he was not a "free white person" or of African descent, as was required by law. The case stretched on for nine months, but Pandit was granted citizenship by the ruling of Judge Willis Morrison over the Bureau's objection, accepting his designation as white.

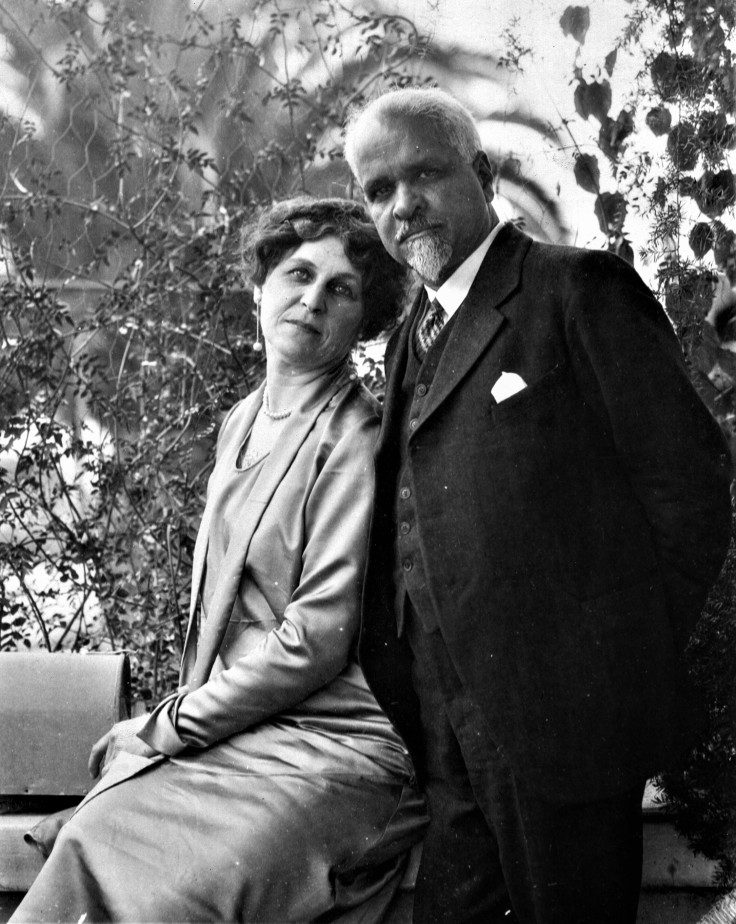
Pandit and Lillian Stringer, his wife

Subsequently, Pandit became a lawyer and was admitted to the California bar, as well as being admitted to the federal bar to argue appeals before the United States Court of Appeals for the Ninth Circuit. In 1920, Pandit married a white woman, Lillian Stringer. The marriage was only legal under California law because both were considered officially white. As a result of his marriage, Pandit was disinherited by his family and lost his right to an inheritance of property in India. As a naturalized US citizen, he renounced his British Indian citizenship, losing his doctoral degree in the process.

== United States v. Bhagat Singh Thind ==
Pandit represented a fellow Indian American, Bhagat Singh Thind, in the 1923 case United States v. Bhagat Singh Thind before the Supreme Court. The Court found that Thind was ineligible for United States citizenship because he did not qualify as a "white person".

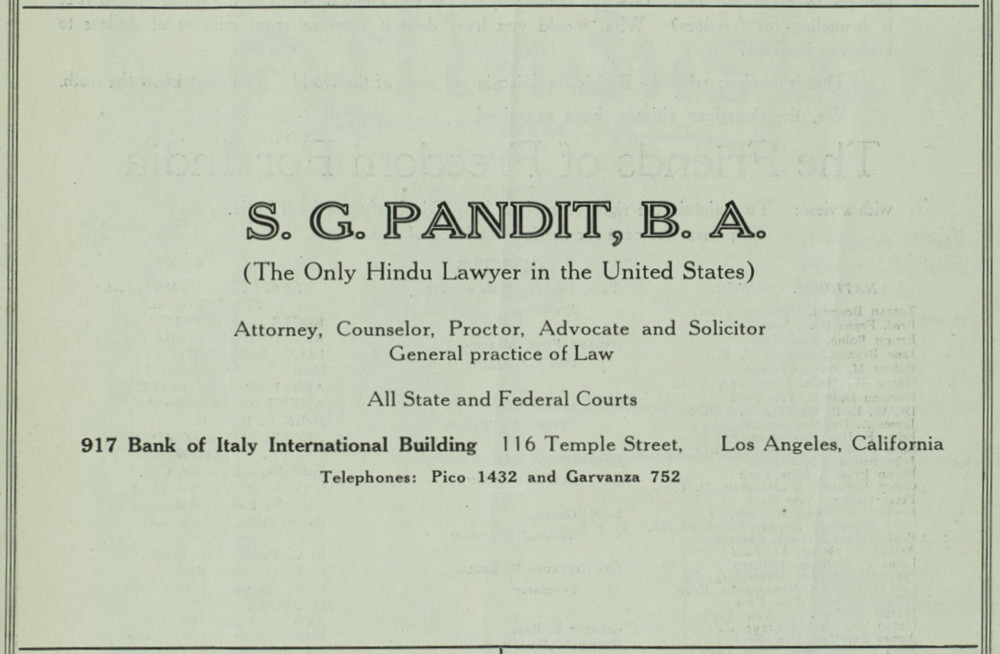
An advertisement for Pandit's services as an attorney in Los Angeles

Following this case, the Bureau of Naturalization began action to strip Pandit and other Indian Americans of their citizenship, arguing it had been "illegally procured". By the time Pandit's case came to trial in 1926, forty-two of sixty-nine citizenships granted to Indians had been revoked. Pandit, a skilled lawyer, argued that under the doctrine of equitable estoppel, he would be irreversibly harmed by the revocation of his American citizenship, which he had reasonably relied upon - he would become stateless, lose his property and law license, and his wife would lose her citizenship as well.

Judge Paul McCormick, the initial trial judge, ruled in Pandit's favor, accepting his arguments wholeheartedly. In 1926, in U.S. v. Pandit, the Ninth Circuit upheld McCormick's ruling under the doctrine of res judicata. As a result of Pandit's case, the US government subsequently dropped its other denaturalization cases against Indian Americans.

In 1930, Pandit was listed by a House of Representatives committee investigating communism (the Fish Committee) as one of the executive chairs of the Los Angeles branch of the All-America Anti-Imperialist League, describing him as an active participant "in the fight for independence of oppressed nationalities". In 1946, the Luce–Celler Act removed racial qualifications for naturalization under United States law, although it set strict nationality-based quotas that limited immigration from many predominantly non-white countries. Pandit died at his home in Los Angeles on August 7, 1959.
