= Taragarh Talawa =

Taragarh Talawa Talawa
- Village
- Nickname: Taragarh
- Location in Punjab, India Taragarh Talawa (India)
- Coordinates: 31°33′02″N 75°3′42″E
- Country: India
- State: Punjab
- District: Amritsar

Languages
  - Official: Punjabi
- Time zone: UTC+5:30 (IST)
- PIN: 143115
- Nearest city: Amritsar
- Lok Sabha constituency: Khadoor Sahib
- Vidhan Sabha constituency: Jandiala Guru

Taragarh Talawa is a village which now officially called Taragarh located at two kilometers from Jandiala Guru, Amritsar district, Punjab, India on the Grand Trunk Road, located at 31° 33' 41N 75° 1'36E at an altitude of 229 m (754 ft).

The origin of the village's name is shrouded in myth. One claims that Maharaja Ranjit Singh gave the village to a servant named Tara. Another traces the name to the Punjabi word "talawa", the act of tying thread to a kite, since the road to the village is reminiscent of a "talawa".

Taragarh is a village in Jandiala-4 Tehsil in Amritsar District of Punjab State, India. It is located 23 km towards East from District headquarters Amritsar. 12 km from Jand. 219 km from State capital Chandigarh. Taragarh Pin code is 143115 and postal head office is Jandiala Guru.

Janian (3 km), Timmowal (3 km), Nangal Guru (4 km), Gehri (4 km), Dhirekot (5 km) are the nearby Villages to Taragarh. Taragarh is surrounded by Tarsikka-7 Tehsil towards North, Khadur-Sahib-10 Tehsil towards South, Tarn Taran-12 Tehsil towards west, Verka-5 Tehsil towards North.

Tarn Taran, Amritsar, Batala, Patti are the nearby Cities to TARAGARH.

== Transport ==
=== Air ===
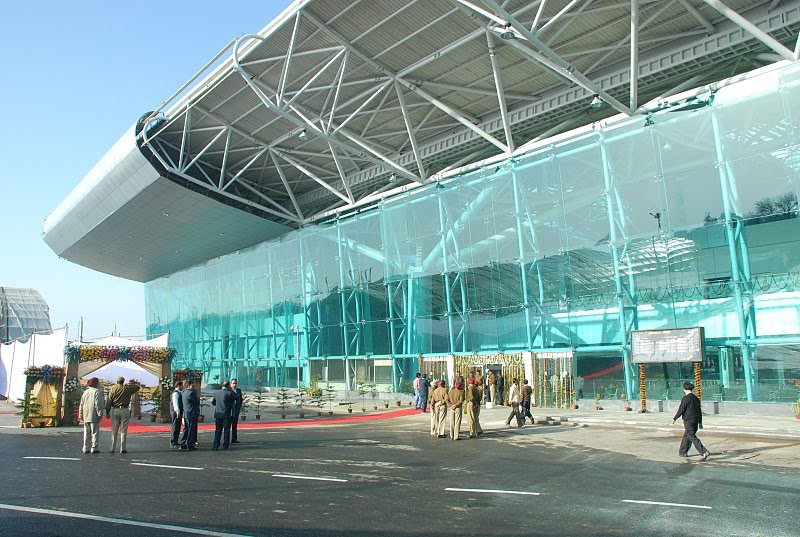
Sri Guru Ram Dass Jee International Airport in Amritsar

Amritsar's international airport, Sri Guru Ram Dass Jee International Airport, has more than 160 domestic and international flights during the week with daily connections to Delhi, Mumbai, Kolkata, Chennai, Bangalore, and Srinagar etc. in India and international flights to London(Heathrow), Birmingham, Melbourne and Sydney via Delhi. Also it has direct flights to Doha, Ashgabat, Tashkent and Dubai. Taragarh is 23 km by road towards East from District headquarters Amritsar.

=== Rail ===
Jandiala Rail Way Station, Tangra Rail Way Station are the very nearby railway stations to Taragarh. However Amritsar Jn Rail Way Station is major railway station 22 km near to Taragarh.

=== Road ===
Taragarh is located 3 km away from the historic Grand Trunk Road (G.T Road), also known as National Highway 1, and therefore very well connected to the road network. Daily bus services run to and from the Amritsar-Jalandhar stretch of G.T. Road to four lanes. From Jandiala guru stop to Taragarh is only 5 km away and auto rickshaw, rickshaw or bus service for Khadoor Sahib road is main transport available.

== Geography and climate ==
Taragarh Talawa village is in Amritsar which is located at 31.63°N 74.87°E with an average elevation of 234 metres (768 ft).

Amritsar has a semiarid climate, typical of Northwestern India and experiences four seasons primarily: winter season (December to March) with temperature ranges from 0 °C (32 °F) to about 15 °C (59 °F), summer season (April to June) where temperatures can reach 42 °C (108 °F), monsoon season (July to September) and post-monsoon season (October to November). Annual rainfall is about 681 millimetres (26.8 in). The lowest recorded temperature is −7.6 °C (18.3 °F), was recorded on 9 December 1996 and the highest temperature, 48.1 °C (118.6 °F), was recorded on 22 May 2013.

Climate data for Amritsar
| Month | Jan | Feb | Mar | Apr | May | Jun | Jul | Aug | Sep | Oct | Nov | Dec | Year |
|---|---|---|---|---|---|---|---|---|---|---|---|---|---|
| Record high °C (°F) | 29.0 (84.2) | 31.1 (88.0) | 35.7 (96.3) | 41.9 (107.4) | 48.1 (118.6) | 46.2 (115.2) | 42.0 (107.6) | 37.2 (99.0) | 36.5 (97.7) | 34.6 (94.3) | 29.3 (84.7) | 23.2 (73.8) | 48.1 (118.6) |
| Mean daily maximum °C (°F) | 19.4 (66.9) | 21.6 (70.9) | 26.5 (79.7) | 33.8 (92.8) | 38.7 (101.7) | 39.4 (102.9) | 35.0 (95.0) | 34.2 (93.6) | 34.5 (94.1) | 32.3 (90.1) | 27.1 (80.8) | 21.3 (70.3) | 30.3 (86.5) |
| Daily mean °C (°F) | 11.6 (52.9) | 13.9 (57.0) | 18.7 (65.7) | 25.1 (77.2) | 29.9 (85.8) | 32.1 (89.8) | 30.2 (86.4) | 29.7 (85.5) | 28.3 (82.9) | 23.8 (74.8) | 17.9 (64.2) | 12.9 (55.2) | 22.8 (73.0) |
| Mean daily minimum °C (°F) | 3.7 (38.7) | 6.0 (42.8) | 10.9 (51.6) | 16.3 (61.3) | 21.1 (70.0) | 24.6 (76.3) | 25.3 (77.5) | 25.1 (77.2) | 22.2 (72.0) | 15.1 (59.2) | 8.7 (47.7) | 4.4 (39.9) | 15.3 (59.5) |
| Record low °C (°F) | −3.5 (25.7) | −1.6 (29.1) | 2.6 (36.7) | 5.7 (42.3) | 7.7 (45.9) | 13.8 (56.8) | 14.0 (57.2) | 15.0 (59.0) | 10.5 (50.9) | 4.6 (40.3) | 1.7 (35.1) | −2.7 (27.1) | −3.5 (25.7) |
| Average rainfall mm (inches) | 24 (0.9) | 33 (1.3) | 48 (1.9) | 29 (1.1) | 25 (1.0) | 62 (2.4) | 231 (9.1) | 187 (7.4) | 79 (3.1) | 18 (0.7) | 6 (0.2) | 18 (0.7) | 760 (29.8) |
| Average rainy days (≥ 1.0 mm) | 2.8 | 3.7 | 5.0 | 3.5 | 2.8 | 4.6 | 11.4 | 9.1 | 4.3 | 1.4 | 1.2 | 2.0 | 51.8 |
| Average relative humidity (%) | 74 | 70 | 64 | 47 | 38 | 48 | 72 | 77 | 69 | 67 | 73 | 76 | 65 |
| Mean monthly sunshine hours | 181.7 | 192.7 | 219.4 | 265.0 | 294.7 | 269.0 | 215.5 | 227.7 | 240.8 | 253.2 | 220.1 | 182.2 | 2,762 |

== History ==
It is noted as the birthplace of three influential Punjabis.

== Bhagat Singh Thind ==
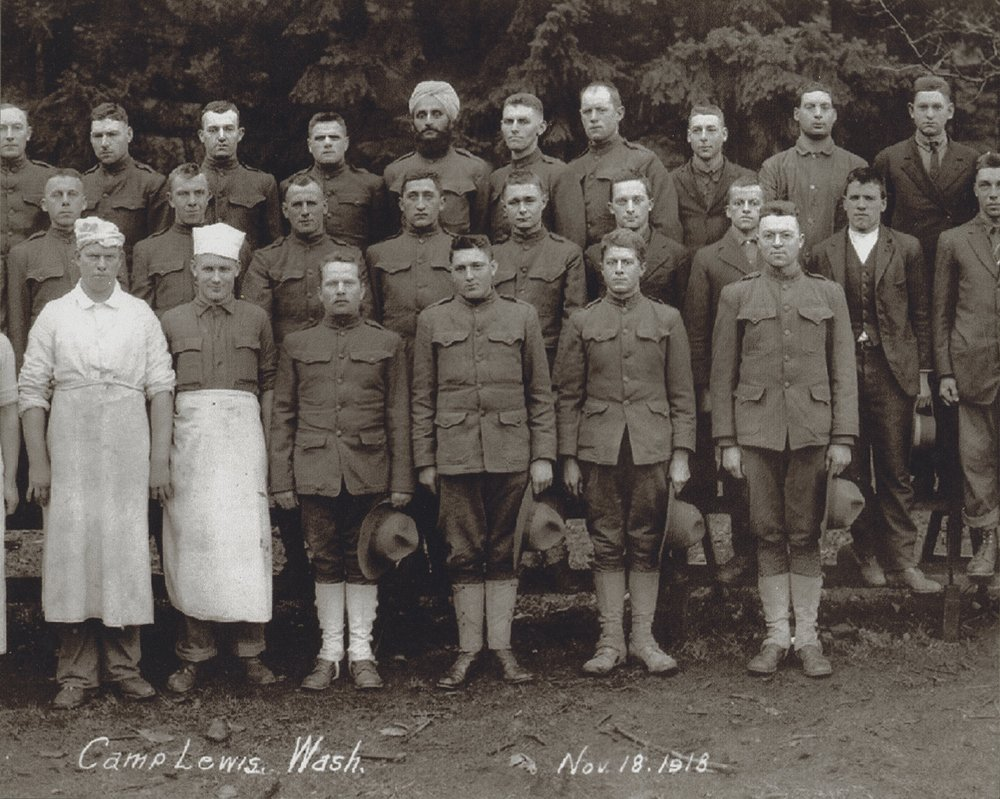
Bhagat Singh Thind with his battalion at Camp Lewis, Washington on 18 November 1918.

Bhagat Singh Thind, PhD, (3 October 1892 – 15 September 1967) was an Indian-American Sikh writer and lecturer on spirituality who initiated an important legal battle over the rights of Indians to obtain U.S. citizenship: United States v. Bhagat Singh Thind.

United States v. Bhagat Singh Thind, 261 U.S. 204 (1923), was a case in which the United States Supreme Court unanimously decided that Bhagat Singh Thind, an Indian Sikh man, was ineligible for naturalization. In 1923, Thind filed for United States citizenship under the Naturalization Act of 1906 which allowed white persons and persons of African descent to naturalize. He did not challenge the constitutionality of the racial restrictions. Instead, he attempted to have Indians classified as "white."

Thind argued that as a high-caste Indian he was "Aryan" and therefore "Caucasian". The Court found that "the Aryan theory, as a racial basis, seems to be discredited by most, if not all, modern writers on the subject of ethnology," and noted that "the Caucasic division of the human family is 'in point of fact the most debatable field in the whole range of anthropological studies.'"

Dr. Thind was also the first Sikh to serve in the U.S. Army (a few months before the end of World War I), and successfully fought for the right to wear the turban while in uniform.

== Jagat Singh Thind ==
Jagat Singh Thind, younger brother of Bhagat Singh Thind, was among the 376 passengers (340 Sikhs, 24 Muslims, and 12 Hindus, all British subjects) of the ship Komagata Maru. Arriving in Burrard Inlet, Vancouver, on 23 May 1914, they hoped to immigrate to a better life and educational system. However, due to the racist immigration policy of Canada at that time, they were denied entry and the ship was forced to leave on 23 July 1914. Returning to India, a number of passengers were killed in an incident with police. (See Komagata Maru incident.) On 23 May 1914, Dr. Bhagat Singh Thind's youngest brother, Jagat Singh Thind, was amongst the 376 passengers (340 Sikhs, 24 Muslims, and 12 Hindus) who arrived in Burrard Inlet, Vancouver from the Indian sub-continent in hopes for a better life and better educational system. However, due to the racist immigration policy of the Dominion of Canada, the ship was forced to leave on 23 July 1914.

On the voyage back to India many on board endured hardships by the hands of the British. Thus inciting a riot, which resulted in many Indians being abused, jailed, or killed. This riot incident is known as "Budge Budge Riot". Fortunately Jagat eventually made his way back to his village Taragarh Talawa.

== Dalbir Chetan ==
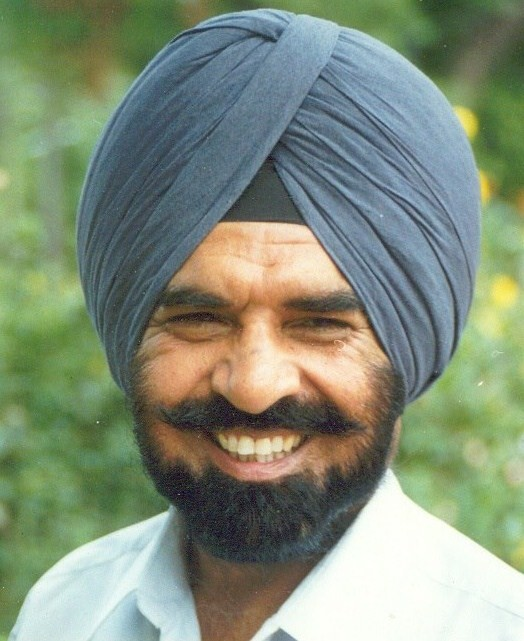
Dalbir Chetan Punjabi Short Story writer

Dalbir Singh Jhand known as Punjabi writer Dalbir Chetan was a famous Punjabi short-story writer, the author of four books of short stories titled: Rishteyian De Aar Paar, Raat Baraate, Khara Badal and Mehndi Bazaar.

Mehndi Bazaar was translated into seven South-East Asian languages, and many of his stories were translated into Urdu, English, Hindi, Oriya, Telugu and Gujarati; some were also dramatized for television. His story Mehndi Bazaar is also part of MIT OpenCourseWare(OCW) South Asian literature and culture coursework of top University Massachusetts Institute of Technology of USA.

=== Books of Dalbir Chetan ===
Dalbir Chetan was a famous Punjabi short-story writer, the author of four books of short stories titled:

- Rishteyian De Aar Paar
- Raat Baraate
- Khara Badal
- Mehndi Bazaar.
- Chetan Katha
- Vida Hon To Pehlan

He edited an anthology entitled Asi Javaab Dinde Haan, which won him appreciation. His story Mehndi Bazaar was also part of MIT Open course as mentioned above.

== Gallery ==
Tourist places near Taragarh Talawa with in 50 km

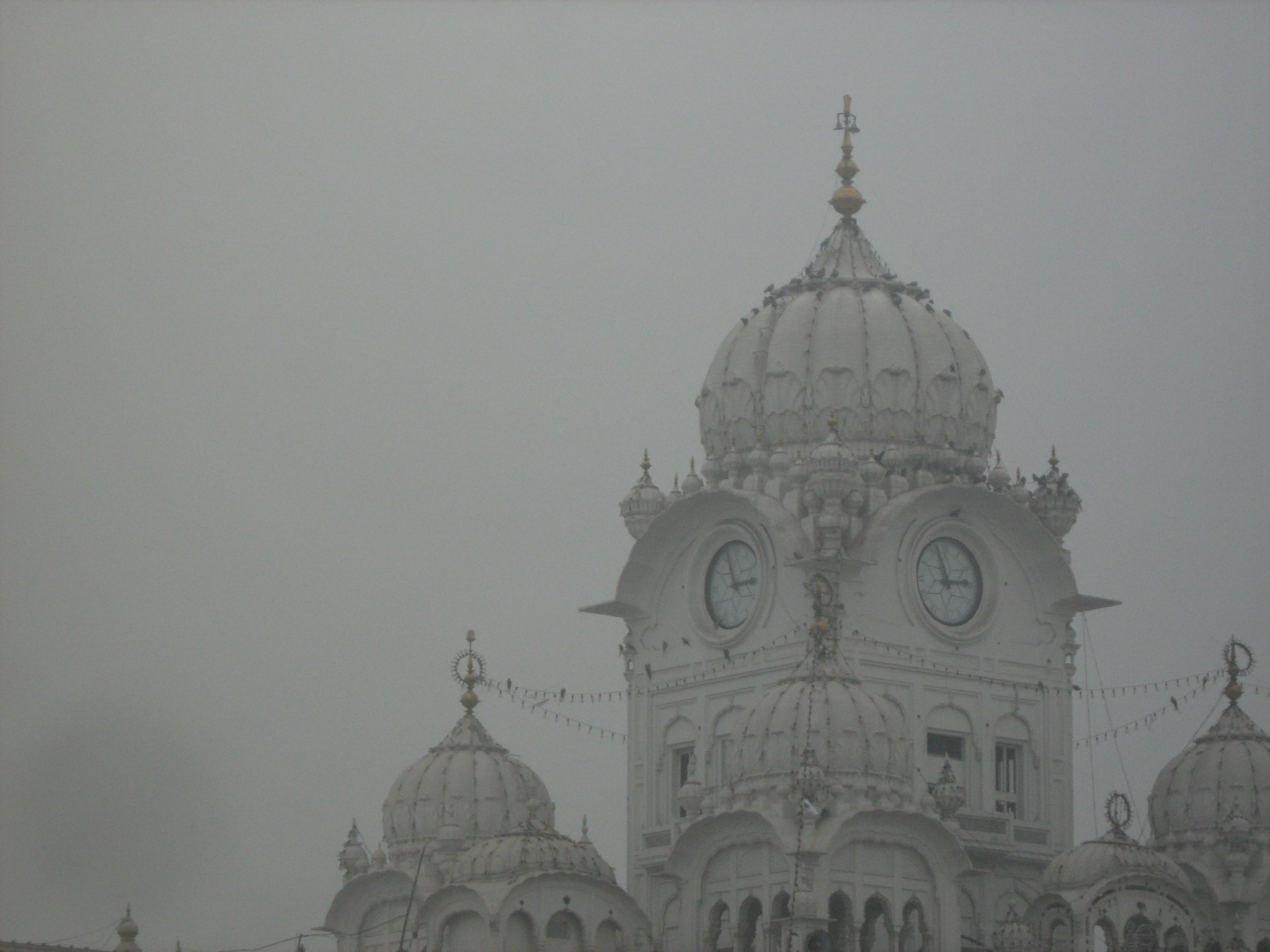
Golden Temple Amritsar

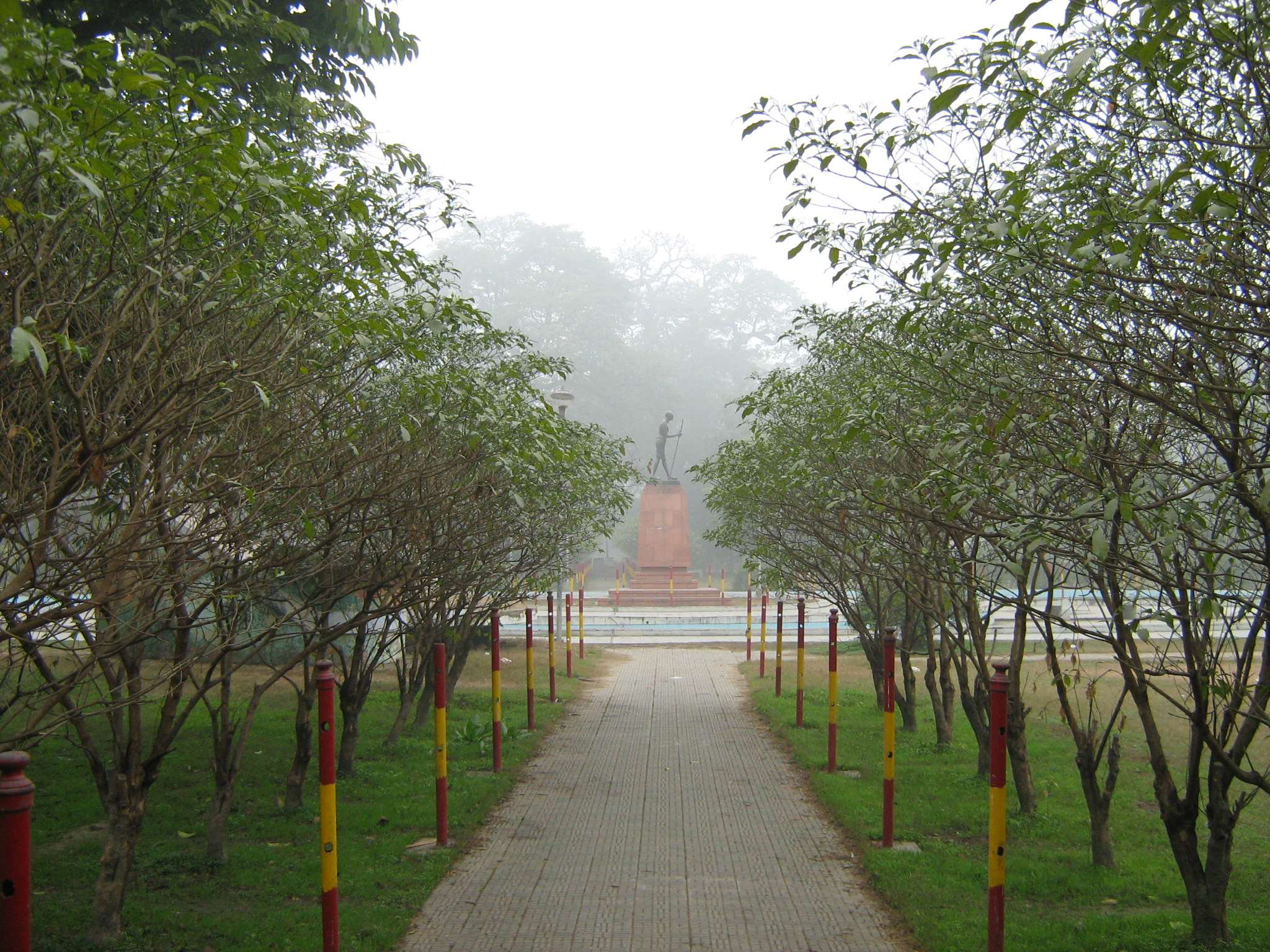
Maharaja Ranjit Singh's Ram Bagh Gardens Amritsar

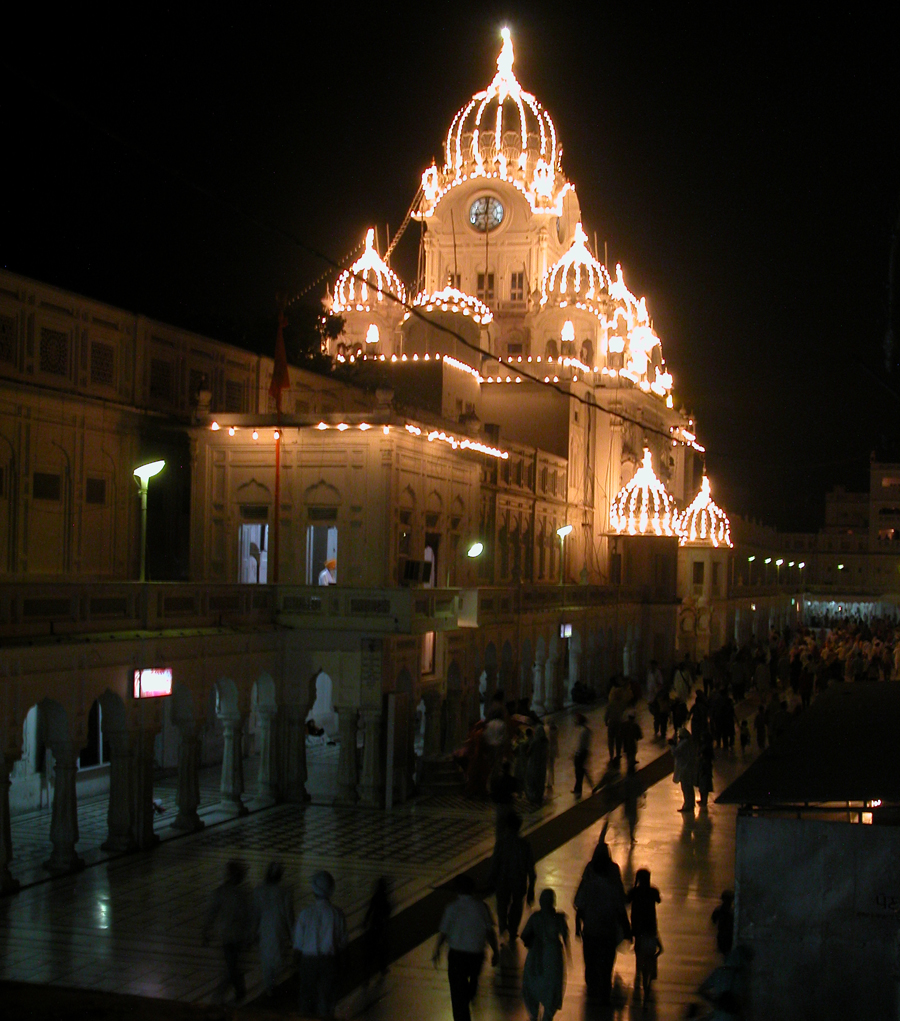
Golden Temple

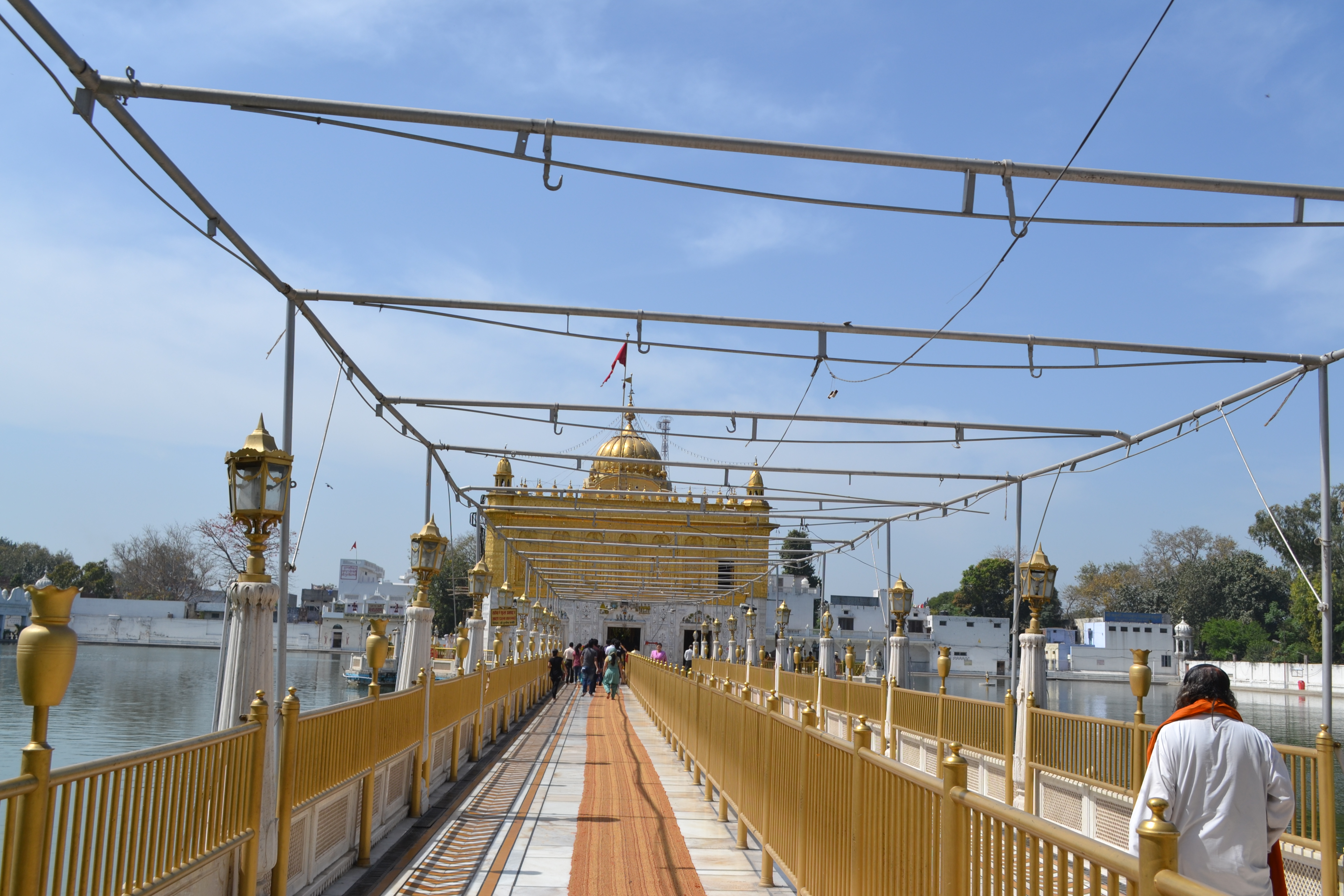
Durgiana Temple bridge

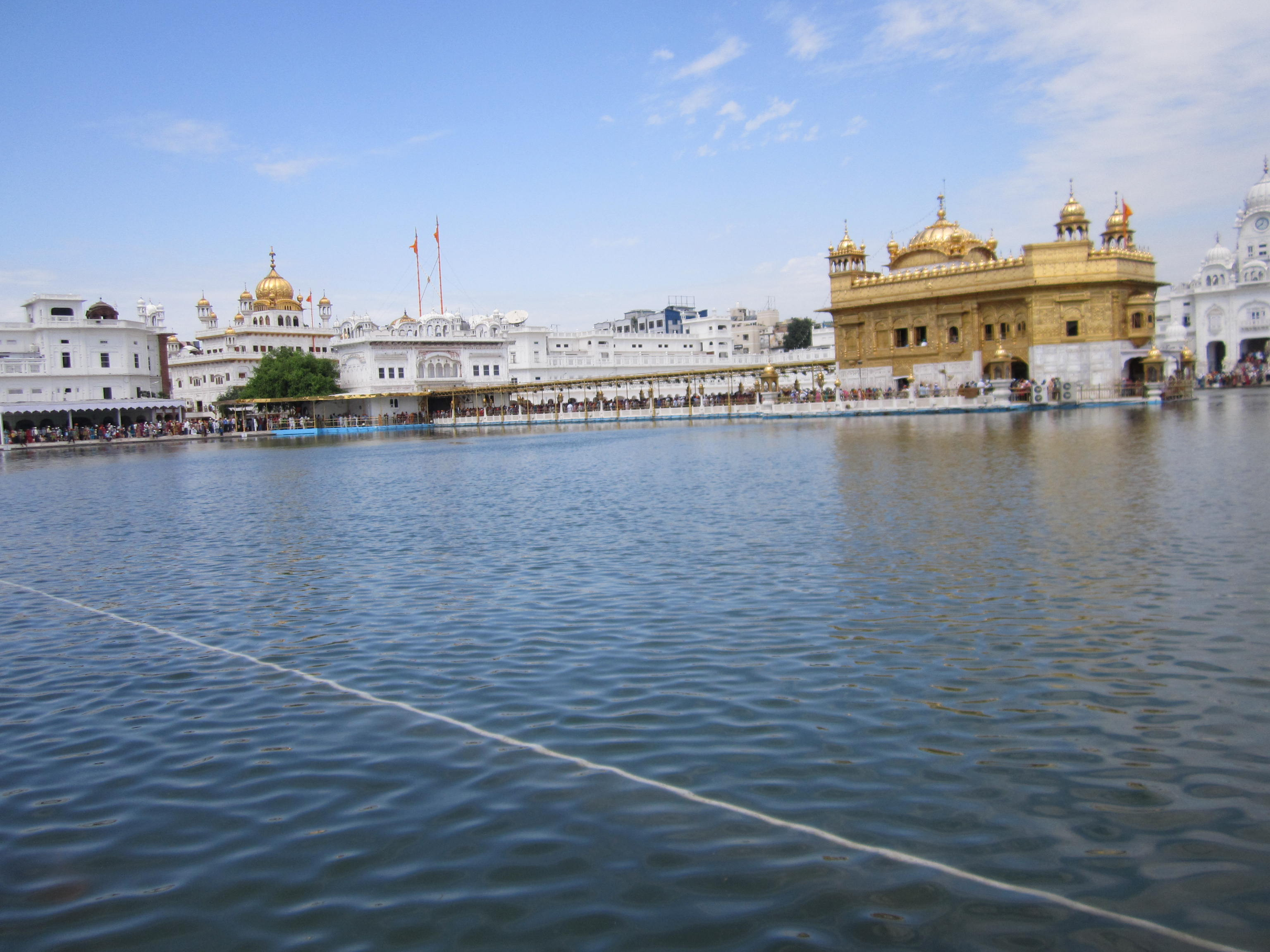
Golden Temple holy water in Day

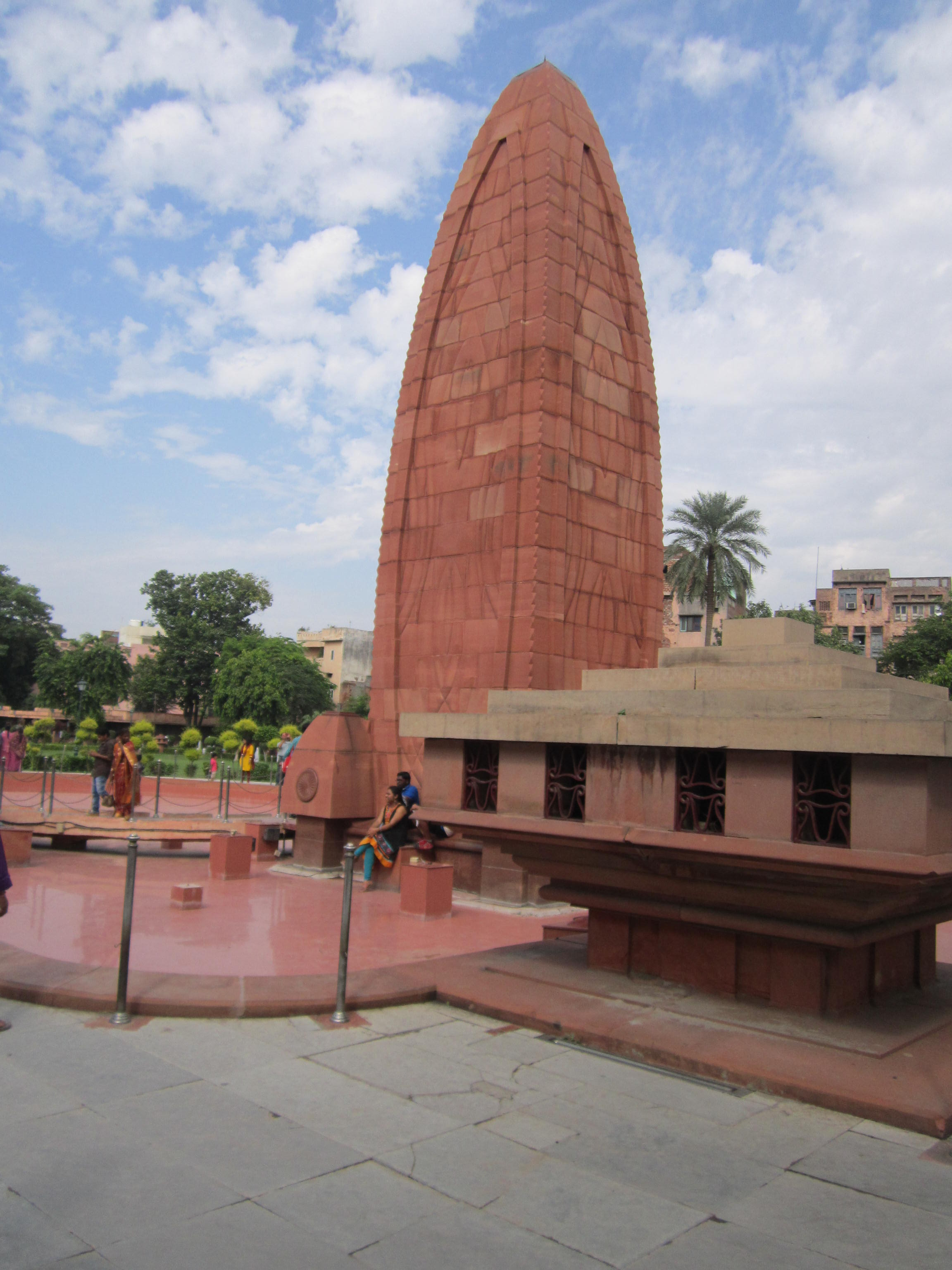
Jallianwala Bagh in Day light

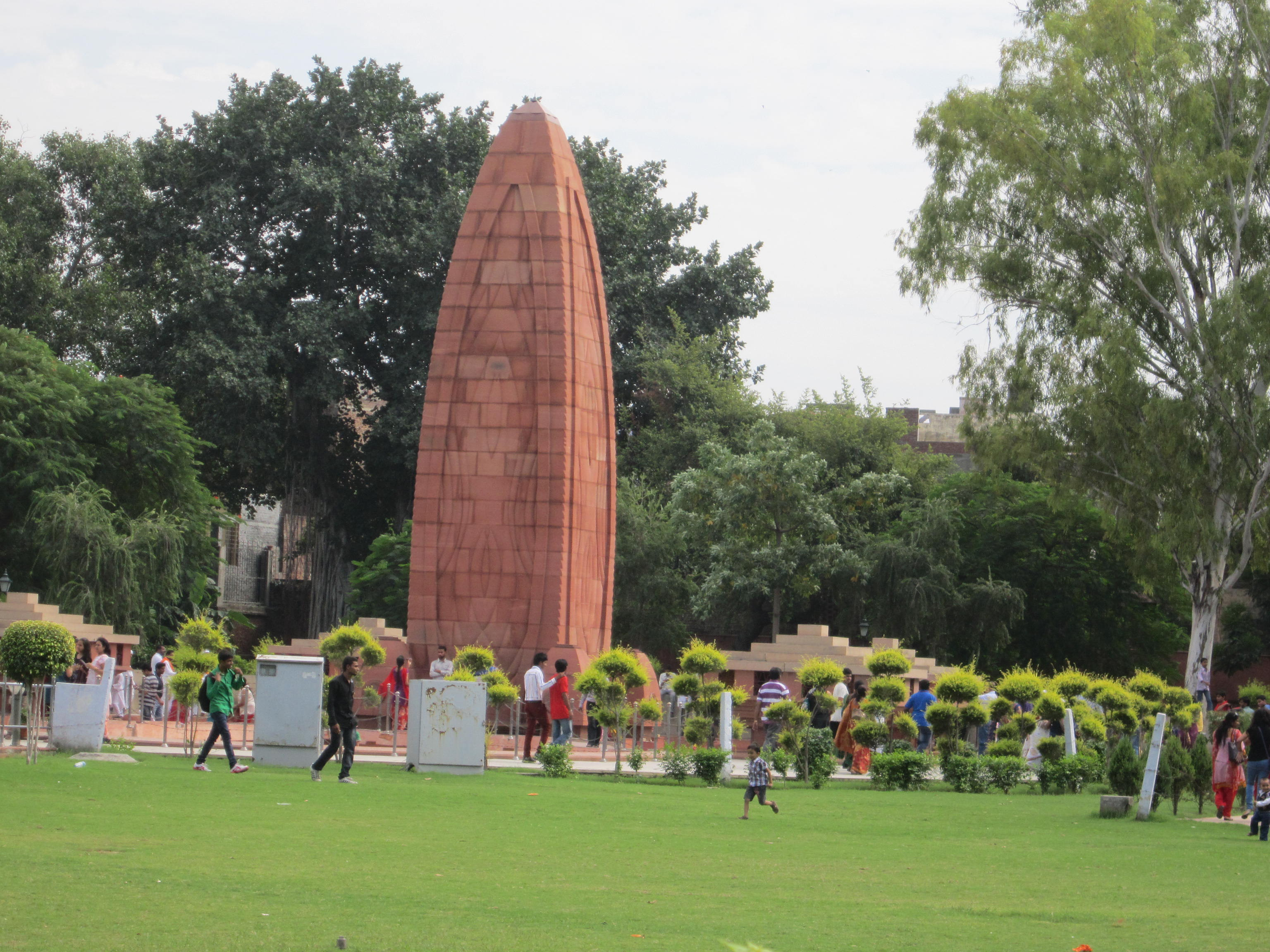

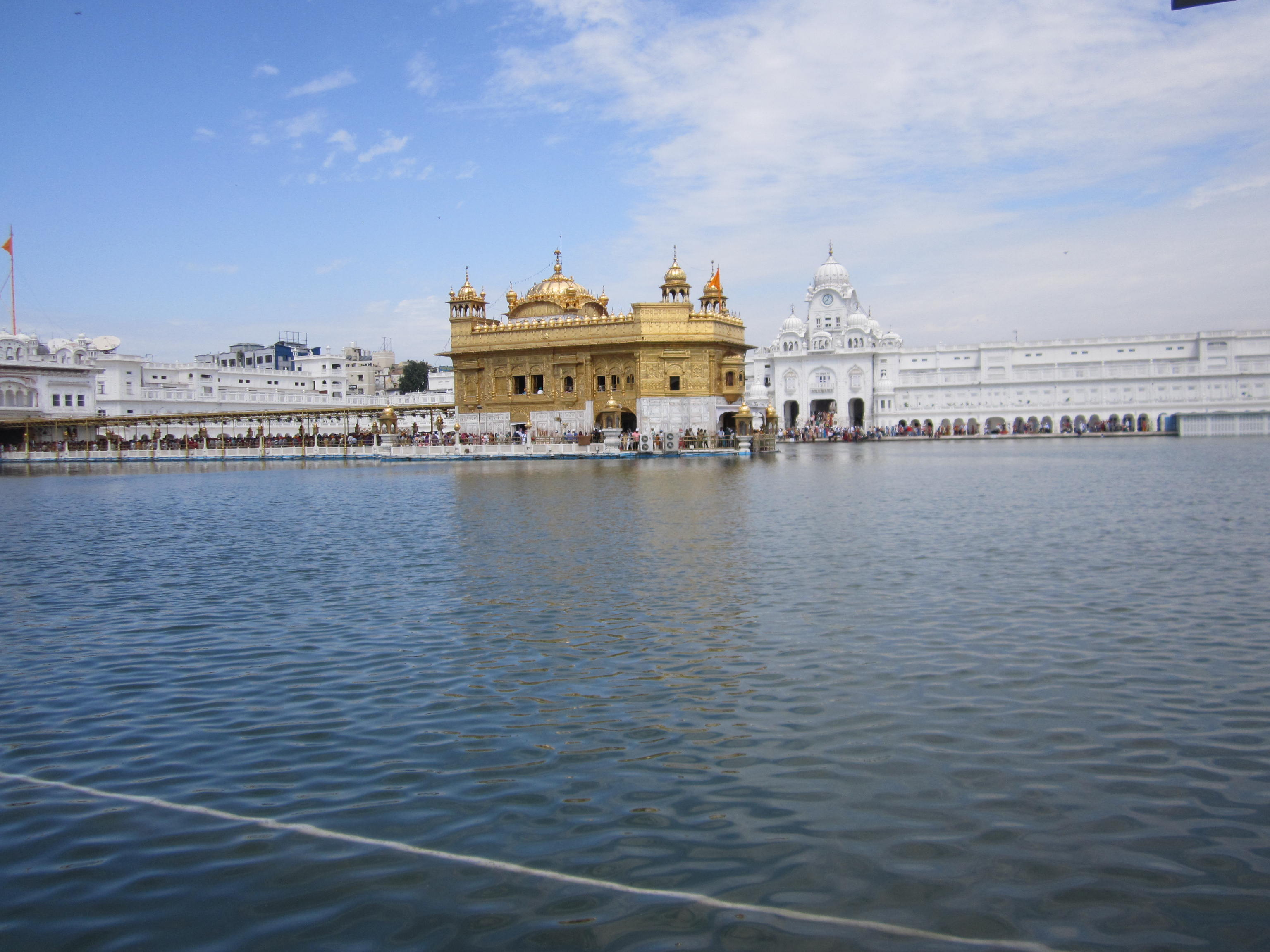

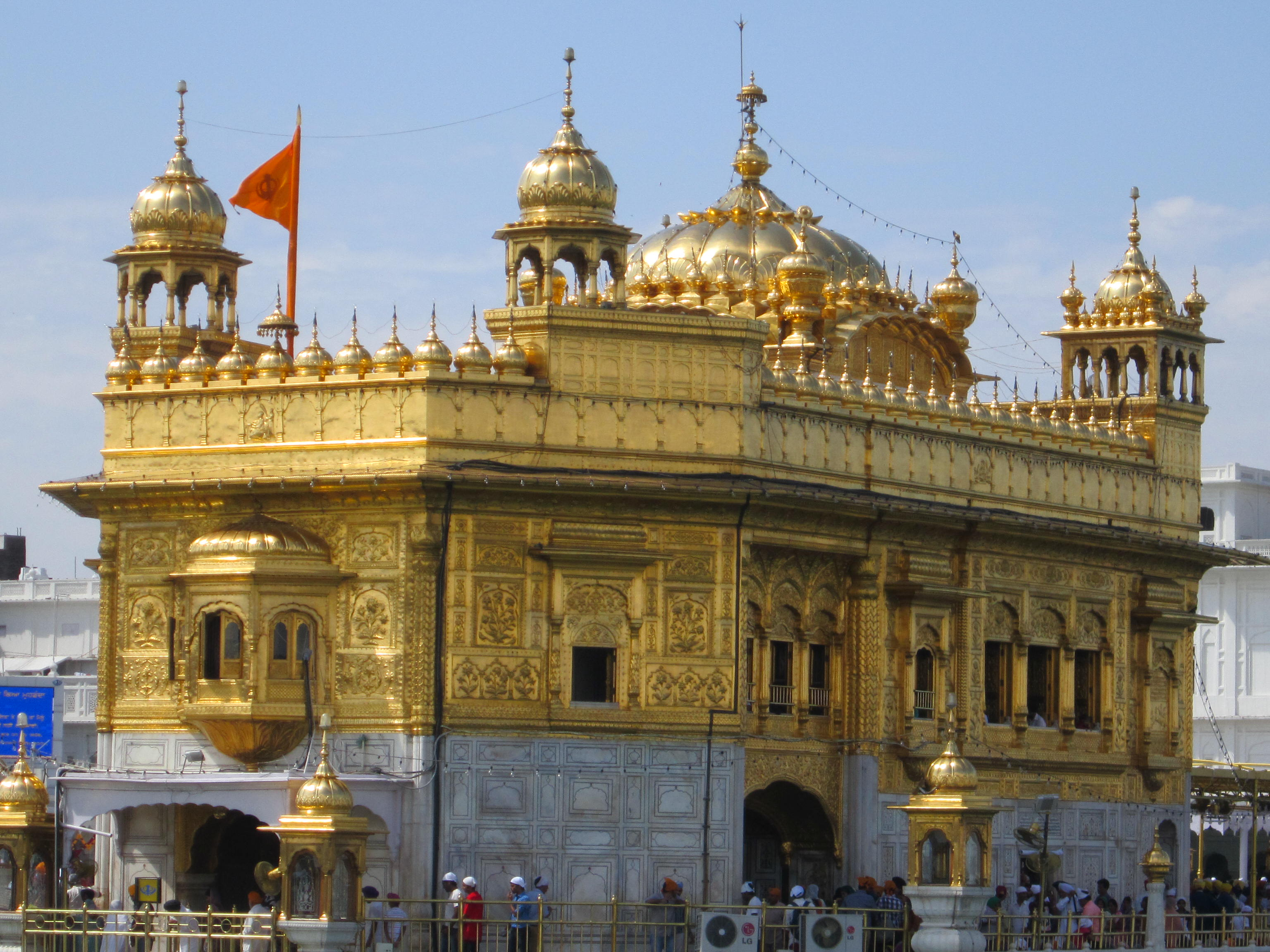

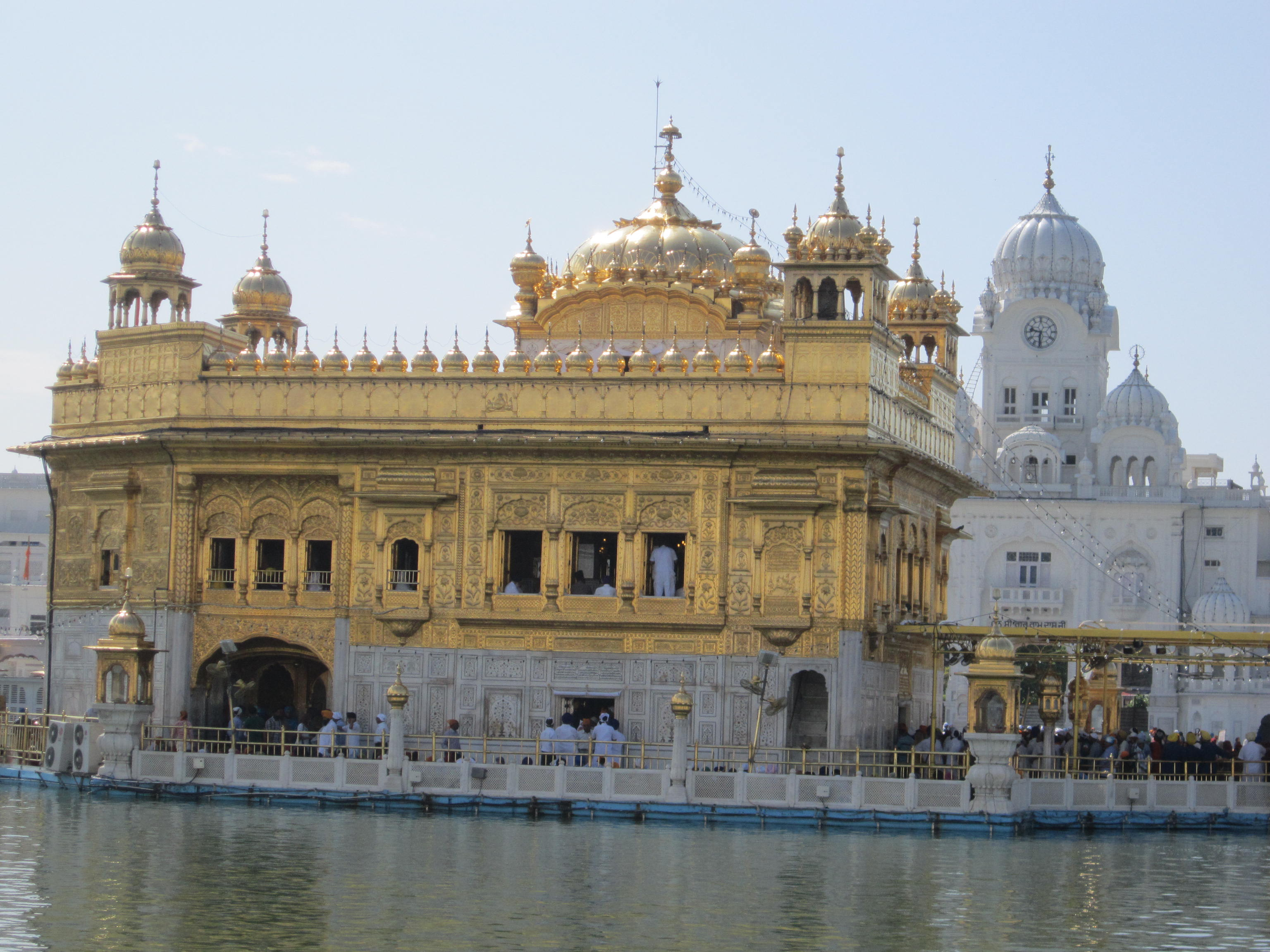

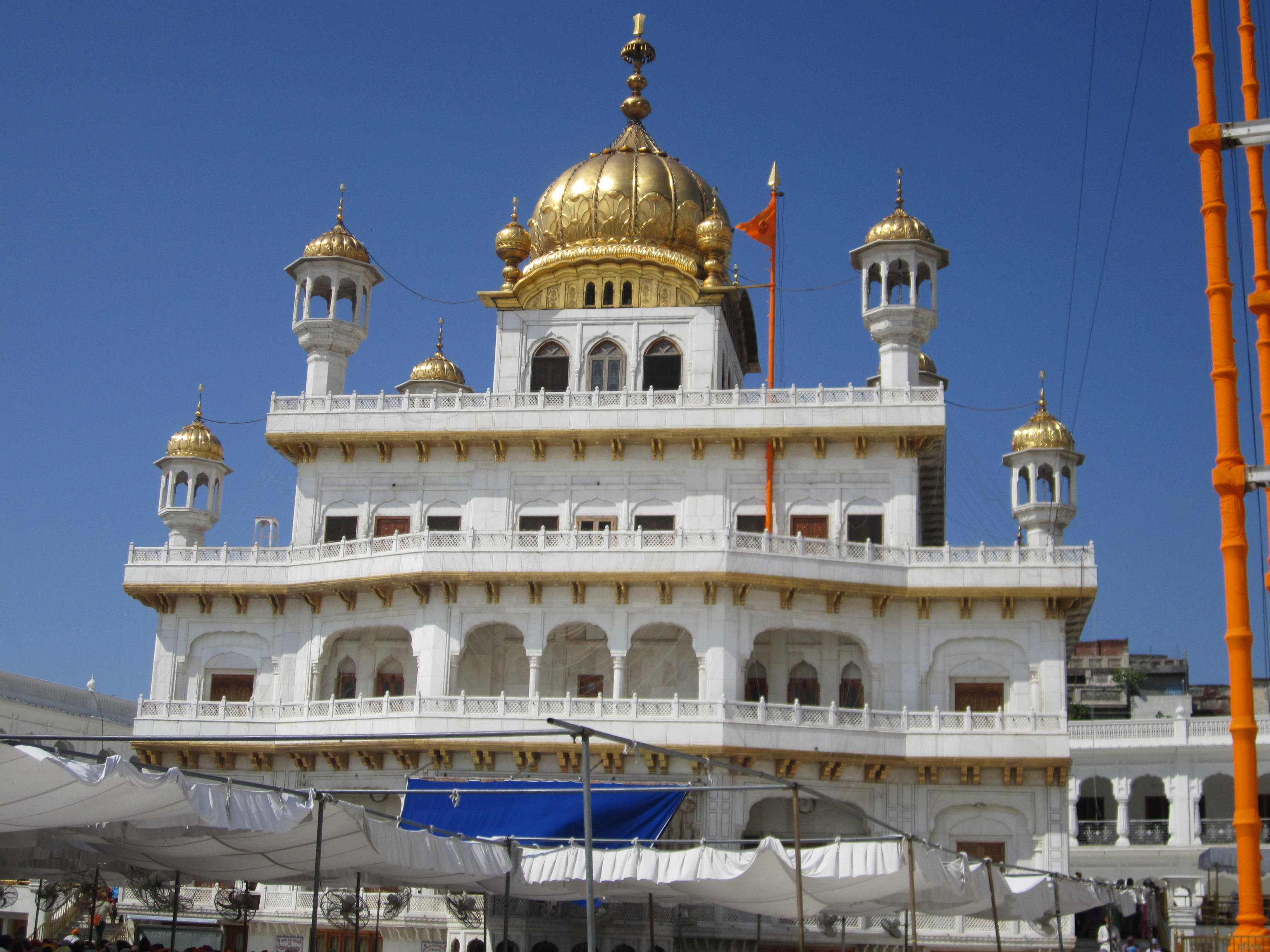

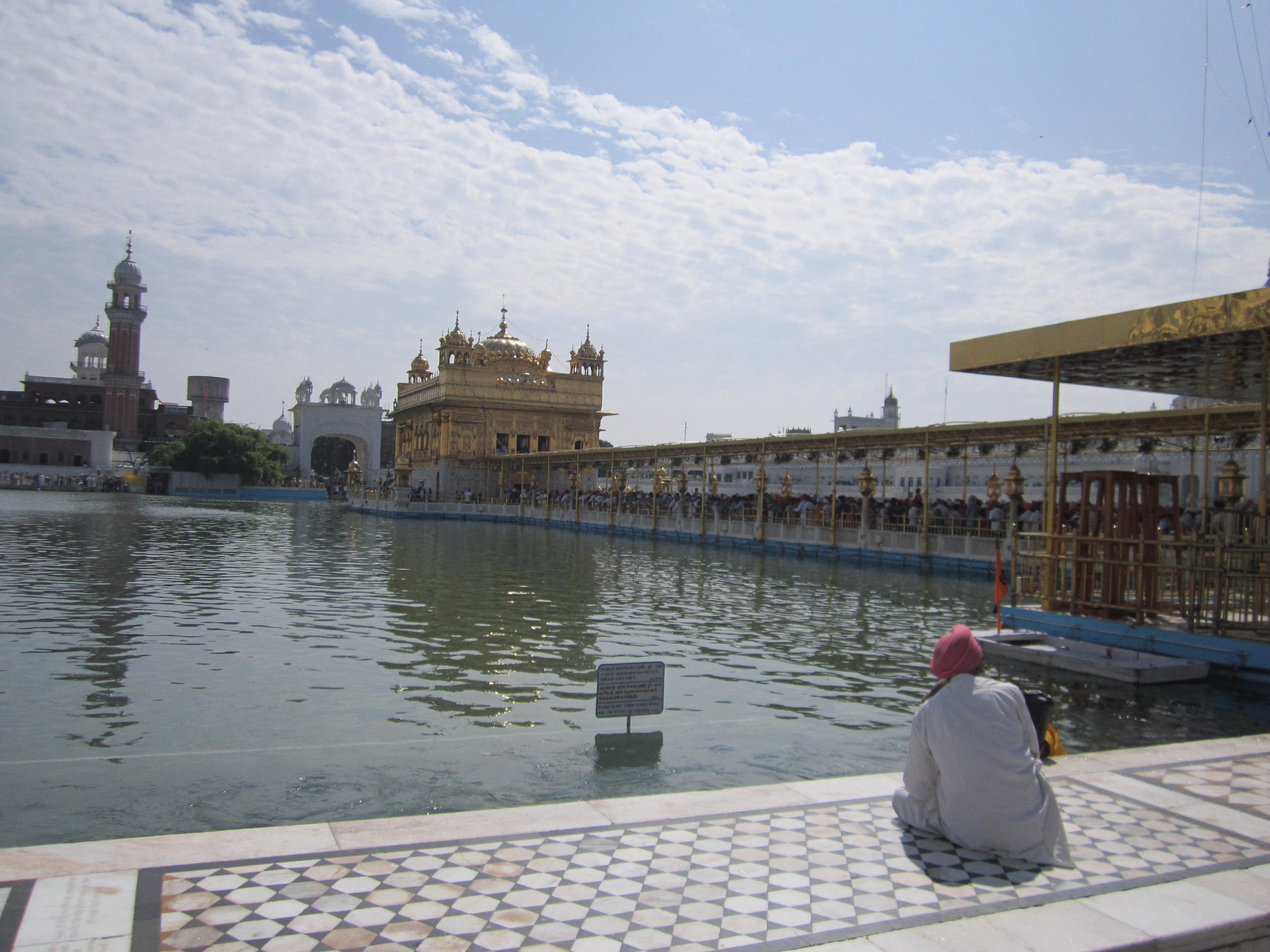

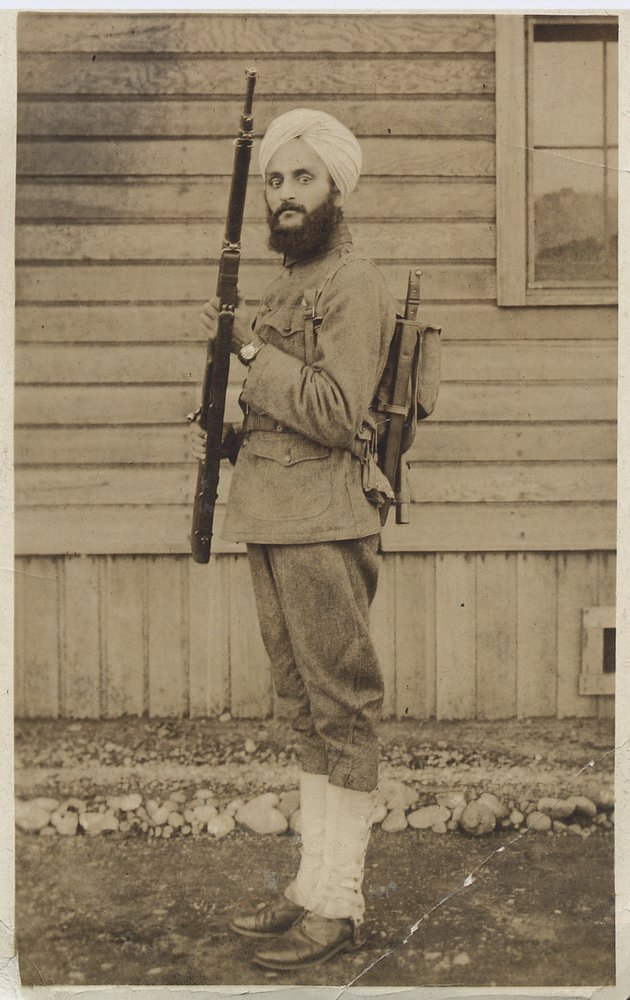
, Bhagat Singh Thind

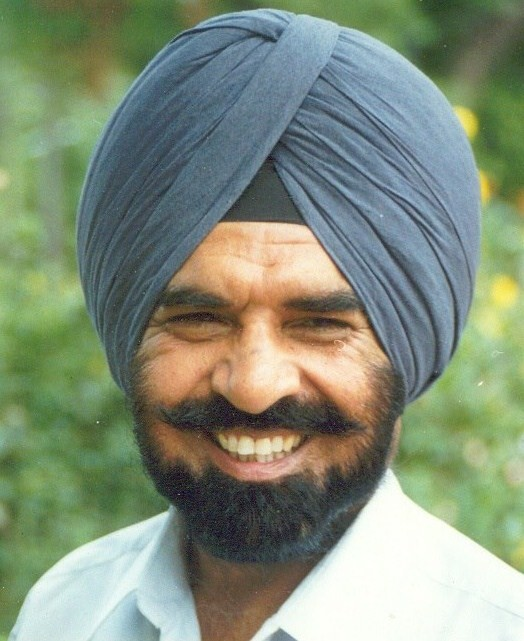
, Dalbir Chetan
