= United States v. Bhagat Singh Thind =

- Supreme Court of the United States

Argued January 11–12, 1923 Decided February 19, 1923
- Full case name: United States v. Bhagat Singh Thind
- Citations: 261 U.S. 204 (more) 43 S. Ct. 338; 67 L. Ed. 616; 1923 U.S. LEXIS 2544

Case history
- Prior: In re Bhagat Singh Thind, 268 F. 683 (D. Or. 1920)

Holding
- People of Indian descent are not white, and hence are not eligible for naturalization.

Court membership
- Chief Justice William H. Taft Associate Justices Joseph McKenna · Oliver W. Holmes Jr. Willis Van Devanter · James C. McReynolds; Louis Brandeis · George Sutherland; Pierce Butler · Edward T. Sanford

Case opinion
- Majority: Sutherland, joined by unanimous
- Superseded by
- Luce-Celler Act

United States v. Bhagat Singh Thind, 261 U.S. 204 (1923), was a case in which the Supreme Court of the United States decided that Bhagat Singh Thind, an Indian Sikh man who claimed to be an Aryan, was ineligible for naturalized citizenship in the United States. In 1919, Thind filed a petition for naturalization under the Naturalization Act of 1906 which allowed only "free white persons" and "aliens of African nativity and persons of African descent" to become United States citizens by naturalization.

After his petition was granted, federal government attorneys initiated a proceeding to cancel Thind's naturalization and a trial ensued in which the government presented evidence of Thind's political activities as a founding member of the Ghadar Party, an Indian independence movement headquartered in San Francisco, California. Thind did not challenge the constitutionality of the racial restrictions. Instead, he attempted to be classified as a "free white person" within the meaning of the Naturalization Act, based on the fact that Indians and Europeans share common descent from the Proto-Indo-Europeans.

Thind was represented by a fellow Indian American, Sakharam Ganesh Pandit, an attorney from California.

The Court unanimously rejected Thind's argument, adding that Thind did not meet a "common sense" definition of white, ruling that Thind could not become a naturalized citizen. The Court concluded that "the term 'Aryan' has to do with linguistic, and not at all with physical characteristics, and it would seem reasonably clear that mere resemblance in language, indicating a common linguistic root buried in remotely ancient soil, is altogether inadequate to prove common racial origin."

The decision became an important example of how racial classifications determined the right to become an American citizen. Although Congress had limited naturalization by race, some ambiguities lingered as to the question of who counted as white. As a result, courts were responsible for interpreting the law and deciding which immigrants qualified for citizenship. The ruling also affected Indian immigrants who had already become citizens because the federal government later sought to cancel some of their citizenship certificates.

For much of American history, a person's race could determine whether they were legally allowed to become a United States citizen. Naturalization is the process through which a person who was not born a U.S. citizen becomes one by meeting requirements established by federal law. Federal naturalization law historically made racial classification an express condition of eligibility for United States citizenship. The Naturalization Act of 1790 limited naturalization to "free white persons," while legislation enacted in 1870 extended eligibility to persons of African nativity or African descent. These classifications were incorporated into Revised Statutes § 2169, which governed racial eligibility for naturalization when United States v. Bhagat Singh Thind was decided in 1923.

Under this statutory framework, immigrants who otherwise satisfied the requirements for naturalization could remain ineligible because of their racial classification. In Ozawa v. United States, 260 U.S. 178 (1922), the Supreme Court held that the Naturalization Act of 1906 had not repealed the existing racial restrictions. The Court also interpreted the statutory term "white persons" as referring to the Caucasian race, although Congress had not supplied a precise definition of the term.

When Thind's case reached the Supreme Court several months later, the Court faced a related question. Thind claimed that he belonged to the Caucasian race under certain scientific theories of ancestry. His argument relied partly on the Court's reasoning in Ozawa, which had associated whiteness with the Caucasian classification.

However, the Court rejected Thind's argument and relied instead on how the word "white" was commonly understood.

== Background ==
Bhagat Singh Thind had come to the United States in 1913 for higher studies after obtaining a bachelor's degree in India. He enlisted in the United States Army, became a Sergeant, and served in World War I. He was discharged honorably with his character designated as "excellent". Thind was granted citizenship in the state of Washington in July 1918 but his citizenship was rescinded in just four days. Thind then applied for citizenship a second time while working in Oregon on May 6, 1919. He received his citizenship in the state of Oregon in November 1920 after the Bureau of Naturalization was unsuccessful in its efforts to stall it in Oregon court. The case then reached the Supreme Court, where Sakharam Ganesh Pandit, a California attorney and fellow immigrant, represented Thind.

Why naturalization applications were decided by courts

During the early twentieth century, immigrants generally applied for American citizenship through the courts. Unlike the modern naturalization process, in which a federal immigration agency reviews applications, judges historically had the authority to grant citizenship to eligible immigrants.

State and federal courts handled naturalization petitions, reviewed whether applicants met the legal requirements, and issued orders granting or denying citizenship. The Naturalization Act of 1906 introduced greater federal oversight and standardized procedures, but courts continued to make naturalization decisions.

For Thind, this meant that he had to petition a court to become a citizen. Although the Oregon court granted his application in 1920, federal officials challenged the decision because they believed he did not meet the racial requirements for citizenship.

Thind's case reached the Supreme Court after the government sought to cancel the citizenship he had received. The central issue was not whether Thind had lived in the United States long enough or served honorably in the military. It was whether he qualified as a "white person" under the federal naturalization law. [3, 9]

The fact that courts made these decisions also meant that judges played a direct role in determining the legal meaning of racial categories. Because Congress had not precisely defined whiteness, judges had to interpret the term when deciding who could become a citizen.

== Argument ==
Thind argued that Indo-Aryan languages, of the Indo European family, are indigenous to the Aryan part of India in the same way the so called "Aryan languages" (European languages), part of the Indo European family as well, are indigenous to Europe, highlighting the related linguistic ties common between Indian speakers and Europeans speakers, as most European languages including English are similar to Indo-Aryan languages such as Hindustani.

Three months earlier, the Ozawa v. United States court case had decided that the meaning of white people for the purposes of the Court were people who were members of the Caucasian race. With this in mind, Thind claimed that he was a white person by arguing that he was a member of the Caucasian race. Thind argued using "a number of anthropological texts" that people in Punjab and other Northwestern Indian states belonged to the "Aryan race", and Thind cited scientific authorities such as Johann Friedrich Blumenbach as classifying Aryans as belonging to the Caucasian race. Thind argued that, although some racial mixing did indeed occur between the Indian castes, the caste system had largely succeeded in India at preventing race-mixing. Thind argued that by being a "high-caste, of full Indian blood" he was a "Caucasian" according to the anthropological definitions of his day.

Thind's lawyers argued that Thind had a revulsion to marrying an Indian woman of the "lower races" when they said, "The high-caste Hindu regards the aboriginal Indian Mongoloid in the same manner as the American regards the Negro, speaking from a matrimonial standpoint." Thind's lawyers argued that Thind had a revulsion to marrying a woman of the Mongoloid race. This would characterize Thind as being both white and someone who would be sympathetic to the existing anti-miscegenation laws in the United States.

== Supreme Court decision ==
Associate Justice George Sutherland said that authorities on the subject of race were in disagreement over which people were included in the scientific definition of the Caucasian race, so Sutherland instead chose to rely on the common understanding of race rather than the scientific understanding of race. Sutherland found that, while Thind may claim to have "purity of Aryan blood" due to being "born in Village Taragarh Talawa near Jandiala Guru, Amritsar, Punjab", he was not Caucasian in the "common understanding", so he could not be included in the "statutory category as white persons".

The Court reiterated its holding in Ozawa v. United States, explaining that the words "free white person" in the naturalization act were "synonymous with the word 'Caucasian' only as that word is popularly understood," pointing out that the statutory language was to be interpreted as "words of common speech and not of scientific origin, ... written in the common speech, for common understanding, by unscientific men." Justice Sutherland wrote in his summary:

The eligibility of this applicant for citizenship is based on the sole fact that he is of high caste Hindu stock, born in village Taragarh Talawa, Amritsar district, Punjab, one of the extreme north western districts of India, and classified by certain scientific authorities as of the Caucasian or Aryan race ... In the Punjab and Rajputana, while the invaders seem to have met with more success in the effort to preserve their racial purity, intermarriages did occur producing an intermingling of the two and destroying to a greater or less degree the purity of the "Aryan" blood. The rules of caste, while calculated to prevent this intermixture, seem not to have been entirely successful ... the given group cannot be properly assigned to any of the enumerated grand racial divisions. The type may have been so changed by intermixture of blood as to justify an intermediate classification. Something very like this has actually taken place in India. Thus, in Hindustan and Berar there was such an intermixture of the "Aryan" invader with the dark-skinned Dravidian.

The 1910 Encyclopædia Britannica entry on "Hinduism" that Justice Sutherland cites as his sole source for this history contradicts his conclusion about the Aryans of Thind's birthplace in the Punjab and explicitly refers to the Aryans of India as part of "the white race."

The Court nonetheless also concluded that "the term 'Aryan' has to do with linguistic, and not at all with physical, characteristics, and it would seem reasonably clear that mere resemblance in language, indicating a common linguistic root buried in remotely ancient soil, is altogether inadequate to prove common racial origin."

The Court argued that the exclusion of non-whites was based on the idea of racial difference rather than the idea that one race is superior or inferior to another race. The Court argued that the racial difference between Indians and whites was so great that the "great body of our people" would reject assimilation with Indians.

In conclusion, the Court also noted that "Congress, by the Act of February 5, 1917, 39 Stat. 874, c. 29, § 3, has now excluded from admission into this country all natives of Asia within designated limits of latitude and longitude, including the whole of India," suggesting its intention that natives of India also be excluded from eligibility for naturalized citizenship.

The relationship between Ozawa and Thind demonstrates how the interpretation of the same statutory language affected eligibility for naturalization. In Ozawa, the Court associated the statutory term "white persons" with the Caucasian race. In Thind, however, the Court rejected the argument that an applicant's classification as Caucasian under contemporary anthropological theories necessarily established eligibility. Justice Sutherland explained that the statutory language was to be understood according to its ordinary meaning, rather than treated as a technical scientific classification. The Court therefore concluded that Thind did not fall within the racial category Congress had designated as eligible for naturalization.

The role of science in defining whiteness

The Supreme Court's treatment of scientific evidence was a central feature of the decision. During the early twentieth century, racial theories commonly divided populations into categories such as Caucasian, Mongolian, and Ethiopian. These classifications were used by some scholars and legal authorities, although modern science does not recognize them as distinct biological races.

Thind relied on those classifications because he believed they supported his eligibility under the Court's earlier interpretation of the naturalization law. However, Justice Sutherland explained that the scientific authorities themselves disagreed over the meaning and boundaries of the Caucasian category.

Rather than resolving those scientific disagreements, the Court chose to interpret whiteness according to ordinary usage. This approach meant that an applicant could be classified as Caucasian by some scientific authorities and still be considered legally nonwhite.

The Court's decision therefore shows that legal racial classifications did not necessarily depend on scientific evidence. Judges could rely on prevailing social understandings when interpreting the racial categories established by Congress.

Legal scholar Ian Haney López discusses this issue in White by Law: The Legal Construction of Race (1996). Haney López examines the cases in which American courts interpreted racial requirements for naturalization, including Ozawa and Thind. His work explores how legal decisions contributed to the definition and recognition of racial categories in the United States. [8]

Viewed in this historical context, Thind illustrates how the law participated in defining who was considered white, rather than simply applying an established and universally agreed-upon racial classification.

== Aftermath ==
As a result of the U.S. Supreme Court decision finding that no person of Indian origin could become a naturalized American, the first person from the Indian subcontinent to become an American citizen, A. K. Mozumdar, had his citizenship revoked. A decision on his appeal to the Ninth Circuit Court of Appeals upheld that revocation.

Not only were new applicants from India denied the privilege of naturalization, but the new racial classification suggested that the retroactive revocation of United States citizenship granted to Asian Indian Americans, of which there were many, might be supported by the Court's decision, a point that some courts upheld when United States attorneys petitioned to cancel the citizenship previously granted to many Asian Indian Americans. Up to fifty Indian Americans had their citizenship revoked between 1923 and 1927 as a consequence of the Thind ruling. As they had given up citizenship elsewhere to become naturalized United States citizens, when their United States citizenship was revoked, these Indians became stateless. Even Thind's own lawyer, Sakharam Ganesh Pandit, was targeted for denaturalization. However, Pandit successfully argued before the Ninth Circuit that revoking his citizenship would do him and his wife unfair harm under the equitable estoppel doctrine. His citizenship was upheld, and the Bureau of Naturalization subsequently cancelled its pending denaturalization cases against Indian American citizens.

Another example of the consequences of racial eligibility requirements involved Dinshah P. Ghadiali, an immigrant from India whose citizenship the federal government sought to cancel in 1932 on grounds of racial ineligibility. Ghadiali was among the Indian immigrants who faced denaturalization proceedings following the Supreme Court's decision in Thind.

In her article, "You Will See My Family Became So American": Toward a Minor Comparativism (2015), legal scholar Sherally Munshi examines Ghadiali's efforts to defend his citizenship. During the proceedings, Ghadiali submitted photographs of himself, his children, and his properties to demonstrate his racial appearance and assimilation into American society. According to Munshi, the photographs reflected the significance of perceived racial identity in determining whether an individual satisfied the legal requirements for citizenship.

Ghadiali's proceedings illustrate how the racial restrictions interpreted in Thind affected individuals who had already completed the naturalization process. The government's challenge to his citizenship demonstrates that these requirements were not limited to the initial determination of eligibility; they could also provide grounds for seeking cancellation of a previously granted naturalization certificate.

Some of the consequences of revoked naturalized status are illustrated by the example of some Indian American naturalized citizen landowners living in California who found themselves under the jurisdiction of the California Alien Land Law of 1913. Specifically, Attorney General Ulysses S. Webb was very active in revoking their land purchases; in a bid to strengthen the Asiatic Exclusion League, he promised to prevent Indian Americans from buying or leasing land. Under intense pressure, and with Immigration Act of 1917 preventing fresh immigration to strengthen the fledgling Indian American community, many Indian Americans left the United States, leaving only half their original American population, 2,405, by 1940.

Thind petitioned for naturalization a third time in 1935 after the Congress passed the Nye-Lea Act, which made World War I veterans eligible for naturalization regardless of race. Based on his status as a veteran of the United States military during World War I, he was finally granted United States citizenship nearly two decades after he first petitioned for naturalization.

The repeal of Chinese exclusion laws in 1943 and the granting of naturalization privileges to Chinese encouraged Asian Indians to hope for similar gains. Hurdling over many members of Congress and the American Federation of Labor, which vehemently opposed removing legislative measures barricading Indian immigration and naturalization, the Asian Indian community finally succeeded in gaining support among several prominent congressmen, as well as President Franklin D. Roosevelt. The support culminated in the signing into law by President Harry S. Truman on July 2, 1946, of the Luce–Celler Act. This Act reversed the Thind decision by explicitly extending racial eligibility for naturalization to natives of India, and set a token quota for their immigration at 100 per year.

Thind's eventual citizenship and changes to federal law

Thind petitioned for naturalization a third time in 1935 after Congress passed the Nye–Lea Act, which made certain World War I veterans eligible for naturalization regardless of race.

Based on his military service during World War I, he was finally granted United States citizenship, nearly two decades after he first petitioned for naturalization.

In 1946, Congress enacted the Luce–Celler Act, which extended naturalization eligibility to people from India and established an annual immigration quota for Indian nationals.

The legislation removed the particular racial barrier to naturalization that had been applied to Indian immigrants in Thind. However, racial restrictions on naturalization did not disappear entirely until the Immigration and Nationality Act of 1952 eliminated racial qualifications for naturalized citizenship.

These legislative changes demonstrate the distinction between the Supreme Court's interpretation of existing citizenship law and Congress's authority to change that law. Although Thind had interpreted the racial restrictions then in effect, Congress later expanded naturalization eligibility through new legislation.

== See also ==
- Racial classification of Indian Americans
- Dred Scott v. Sandford
- Ozawa v. United States
- United States v. Wong Kim Ark
