= Gurbaksh Singh =

Indian writer

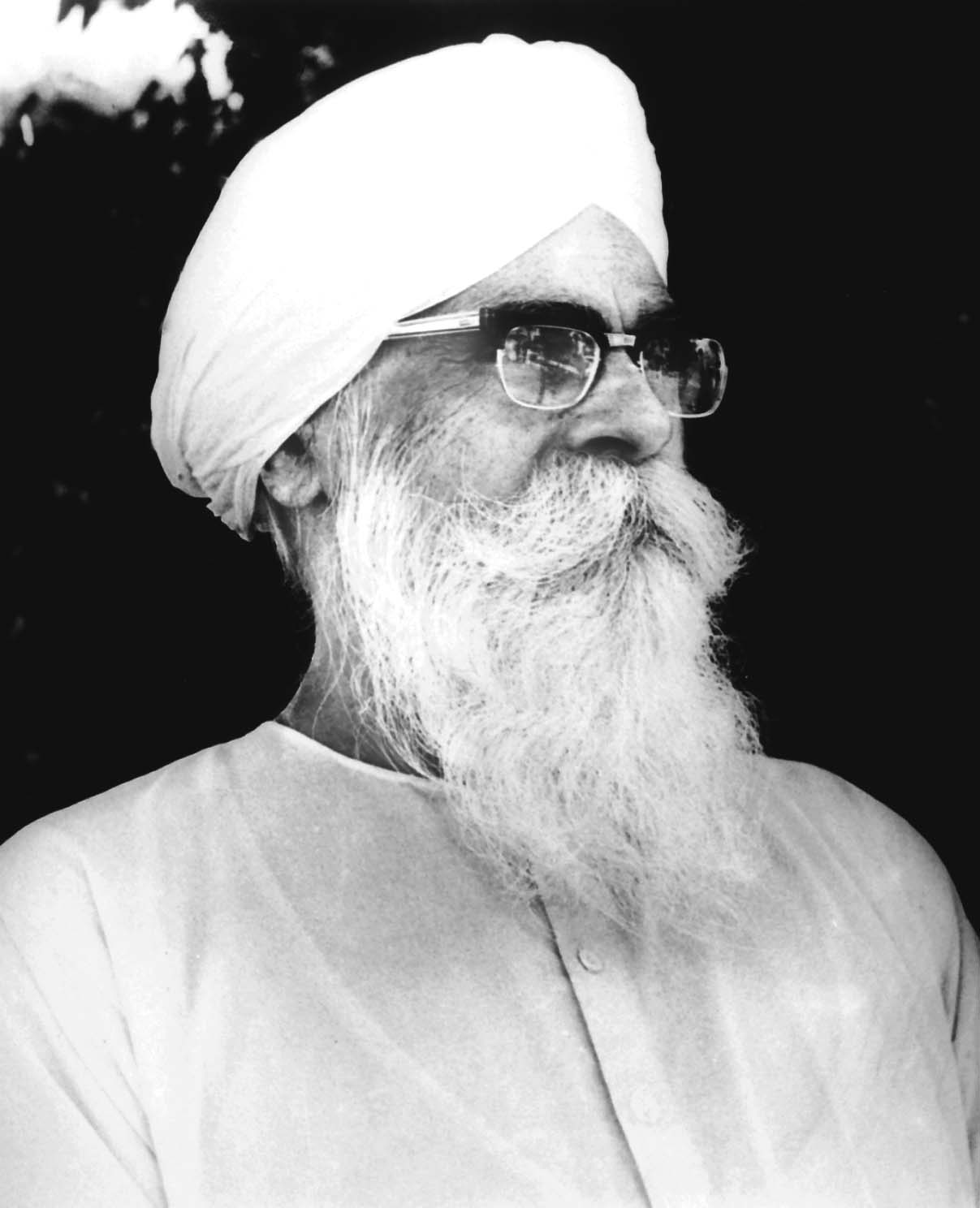
Photo of Gurbaksh Singh

Gurbaksh Singh (1895–1977) was an Indian novelist and short story writer with more than fifty books to his credit in Punjabi. He is also considered the father of modern Punjabi prose and received Sahitya Akademi Fellowship, New Delhi in 1971.

Armed with an engineering degree from the Thomson Engineering College (present day IIT Roorkee), he also studied Civil Engineering at University of Michigan, Ann Arbor.

== Preet Nagar ==
Gurbaksh Singh was born in Sialkot (then in British India, now in Pakistan). Gurbaksh Singh established the township of Preet Nagar, located equidistant between Amritsar and Lahore. Gurbaksh Singh Preetlari, through his personal charisma, brought people like Balraj Sahni, Nanak Singh, artist Sobha Singh, and Diwan Singh, father of Lt. Gen. Jagjit Singh Arora of Bangladesh war fame, apart from associating Faiz Ahmad Faiz, Sahir Ludhianvi, Upendra Nath Ashq and Kartar Singh Duggal, playwright Balwant Gargi, poets Mohan Singh and Amrita Pritam: the best talent of the time — to Preet Nagar. The martyr Diwan Singh Kalepani, principal Teja Singh, and principal Jodh Singh were closely associated. Prime Minister Nehru once visited. Mahatma Gandhi and Tagore were aware of it. Mulkh Raj Anand, a renowned writer in English, said that Tagore's legacy was carried forward by four in India, and counts Gurbakhsh Singh as one of these.

He brought great solace and a sense of adventure to the emerging middle class and aspiring professionals through his writings in the journal he founded in 1933. This journal Preet-Lari or Linked (through) Love, preceded the setting up of the township by 5 years. The township was in line with the international trend for Intentional Communities; it had a community kitchen, an activity-based school called Activity School, a park, physical, artistic, political, and economic activity, a team of Peace Corps, gatherings of like minds, theatrical activity, picnics, etc.

Although Preet Nagar suffered a lot at the time of India's partition (it is situated merely a few kilometers from the border that divides India and Pakistan) and most of its inhabitants migrated to Delhi and other cities during those turbulent days, Gurbaksh Singh and his family returned to live there with a few other families.

In the mid-1990s, two decades after Gurbaksh Singh's death, a Trust named 'Gurbaksh Singh Nanak Singh Foundation' was set up to restart cultural activities in Preet Nagar. A building was erected to host a library, an indoor conference hall, and an amphitheater. Currently, under the chairpersonship of the eldest daughter of the writer, Uma Gurbaksh Singh, plays are staged every month in the amphitheater to entertain and educate the local people. This tradition has been going on for the last ten years, and Punjabi plays from all over the state, as well as neighboring Pakistan, have been performed there.

== Preet Lari ==
To share his vision and philosophy of life with others, he started the monthly journal Preet Lari in 1933. The journal became so popular that Gurbaksh Singh came to be known as Gurbaksh Singh Preet Lari, although he himself never used this suffix as an author. During Gurbaksh Singh's lifetime, from the 1950s, his son Navtej Singh, a well-known writer himself, started co-editing the journal with his father and remained its editor until his own death in 1981. After the death of Navtej Singh, his son Sumit Singh, aka Shammi, and Shammi's wife Poonam continued to run the magazine. Shammi was killed by Sikh fundamentalists as he wrote against extremism. The magazine is now run by Poonam Singh, who is the editor, and Rati Kant Singh, Shammi's younger brother and husband to Poonam Singh. Gurbaksh Singh's son Hirday Paul Singh edited "Bal Sandesh," the special children's magazine in Punjabi, also started by Sardar Gurbaksh Singh.

The journal Preet Lari carried translations and interpretations of Western thought, trends, as well as sought to reinvent indigenous institutions in the same, i.e., modern light.

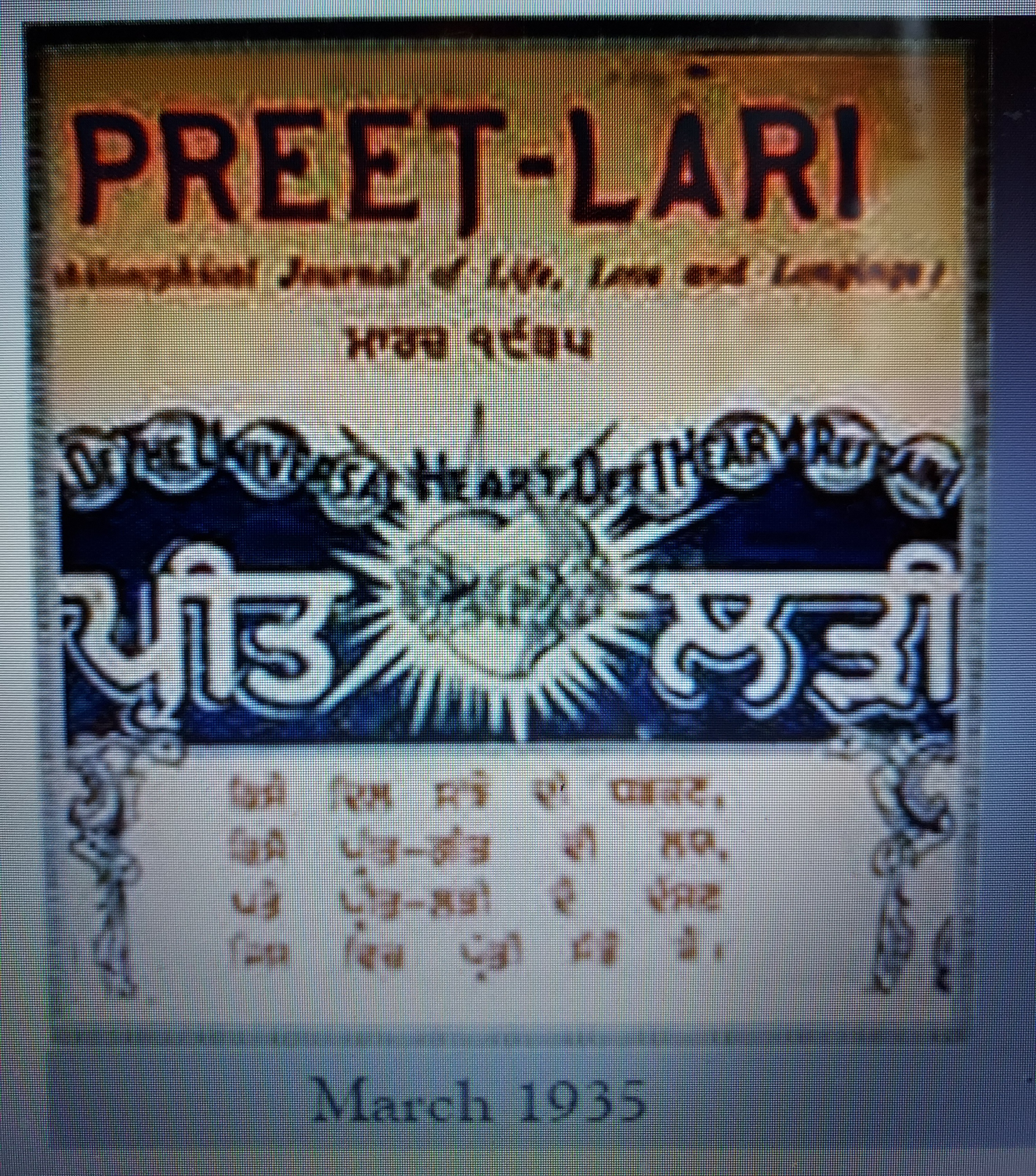
Preet Lari March 1935 Issue

The family members of Gurbakhsh Singh supported his efforts, and the next generation carried on the work during his lifetime and after. The magazine, printed in four languages, influenced the generations now in their late seventies in Pakistan, too, and reached many countries such as Thailand. That is, wherever Punjabis were settled, it helped to bring about a cultural revolution. It continues to be published today and can be read at preetlarimagazine.in edited by Poonam Singh, his granddaughter-in-law and published by his grandson Rati Kant Singh.

== Gurbaksh Singh Preetlari Award ==
There is an Award for Punjabi writers, the Gurbaksh Singh Preetlari Award, which has been given to many modern Punjabi writers such as Dalbir Chetan as mentioned in Who's who of Indian Writers, 1999: A-M book.
