= Dalbir Chetan =

Punjabi writer (1944 - 2005)

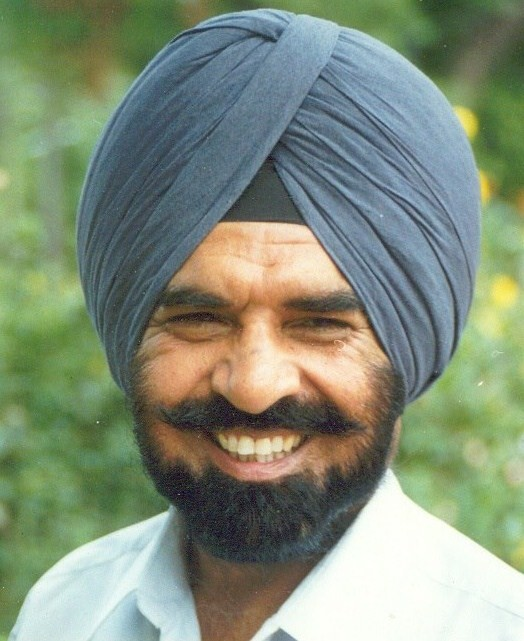
- Born: Dalbir Singh Jhand; 5 April 1944; Taragarh Talawa, Amritsar, Punjab India
- Died: 1 January 2005 (aged 60); Amritsar, Punjab, India
- Occupation: Short Story writer
- Writing career
- Years active: 1944–2005 (his death)

Dalbir Singh Jhand known as Punjabi writer Dalbir Chetan was a foremost short story writer of contemporary Punjabi literature. He had won awards, both regional and national, and is a widely translated author. He retired as Indian Air Force officer. Chetan's works were translated into a number of South-East Asian languages. Though not a prolific writer, he was the author of four thought-provoking short story books — Rishteyian De Aar Paar, Raat Baraate, Khara Badal and Mehndi Bazaar book's main story Mehndi Bazaar was translated and reviewed in journal South Asian Review. His book Mehndi Bazaar was translated into seven South-East Asian languages and selected in Twenty Stories from South Asia. Many of his stories were translated into Urdu, English, Hindi, Oriya, Telugu and Gujarati languages. Some of his short stories were telecast on television. He also edited an anthology "Asi Javaab Dinde Haan", which won him appreciation.

== Biography ==
Dalbir Chetan was born on April 5, 1944, in village Taragarh Talawa in the Amritsar district of Punjab in a well-to-do land-owning family. He was educated at Amritsar and Patiala. Dalbir Chetan completed his studies and joined the Indian Air Force where he served for a long span of 15 years. After retiring from the Air Force, he started a school at his native village. Later, he joined the Excise and Taxation Department from where he retired two years ago. After superannuating from the Air Force and the Excise and Taxation Department, he continued to pursue writing.

== Collection ==
Books: Dalbir Chetan was a famous Punjabi short story writer, the author of Six books of short stories titled:

- Rishteyian De Aar Paar
- Raat Baraate
- Khara Badal
- Mehndi Bazaar.
- Chetan Katha
- Vida Hon To Pehlan

Mehndi Bazaar was translated into seven South-East Asian languages, and many of his stories were translated into Urdu, English, Hindi, Oriya, Telugu and Gujarati; some were also dramatized for television. His story Mehndi Bazaar is also part of MIT OpenCourseWare(OCW) South Asian literature and culture coursework of top University Massachusetts Institute of Technology of USA and selected in Twenty Stories from South Asia.

He edited an anthology entitled Asi Javaab Dinde Haan, which won him appreciation. His story Mehndi Bazaar was also part of MIT Open course as mentioned above.

The characters in Chetan's stories and short stories are the downtrodden and the innocent rural folk with suppressed desires and passions. Tragedy and irony mark the main elements of her fiction. Complex inner duality of the female psyche is the chief theme of Dalbir Chetan. One of his admirers remarked that his demise had recreated a vacuum in the literary circles. It was about Chetan that Amrita Pritam said, "Dalbir Singh Chetan has such a power in his writings that his personified characters actually stir up the sentiments of the reader."

== Awards ==
- Kulwant Singh Virk Award
- Gurbaksh Singh Preetlari Award

== See also ==
- List of Punjabi authors
- List of Punjabi language poets
