= Bhagat Singh Thind =

Indian American writer and civil rights activist

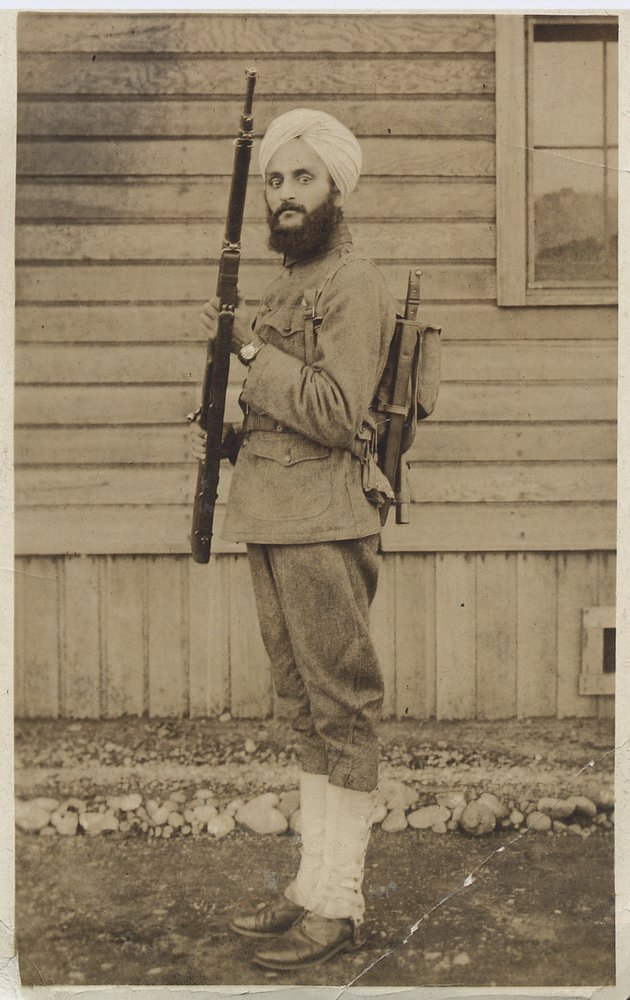
- Sergeant Bhagat Singh Thind in US Army uniform during World War I at Camp Lewis, Washington, in 1918. Thind, an American Sikh, was the first US serviceman to be allowed for religious reasons to wear a turban as part of his military uniform.
- Born: October 3, 1892; Taragarh Talawa, Amritsar, Punjab Province, British India (present-day Punjab, India)
- Died: September 15, 1967 (aged 74); Los Angeles, California, United States
- Citizenship: British Indian (1892–1918); American (1936–1967)
- Occupation: Writer
- Known for: United States v. Bhagat Singh Thind
- Spouse(s): Chint Kaur Inez Buelen (m. 1923; div. 1927) Vivian Davies (m. 1940)

Bhagat Singh Thind (October 3, 1892 – September 15, 1967), also known as Doctorji, was an Indian American Sikh writer and lecturer on spirituality who served in the United States Army during World War I and was involved in a Supreme Court case over the right of Indian people to obtain United States citizenship. He was among a group of people from India who attempted to claim they were white and, therefore, eligible for naturalization under US federal naturalization law in a bid to obtain American citienship.

Thind had enlisted in the United States Army a few months before the end of World War I. After the war he sought to become a naturalized citizen, following a legal ruling that Caucasians had access to such rights. Identifying himself as an Aryan, in 1923, the Supreme Court ruled against him in the case United States v. Bhagat Singh Thind, which retroactively denied all Indian (Asian) Americans the right to obtain United States citizenship for failing to meet the definition of a "white person", "person of African descent", or "alien of African nativity".

Thind remained in the United States, earned his PhD in theology and English literature at UC Berkeley, and delivered lectures on metaphysics. His lectures were based on Sikh religious philosophy, but included references to the scriptures of other world religions and the works of Ralph Waldo Emerson, Walt Whitman, and Henry David Thoreau. Thind also campaigned for Indian independence from British colonial rule. In 1936, Thind applied successfully for US citizenship through the State of New York which had made World War I veterans eligible for naturalization regardless of race.

== Early life ==
Thind was born on October 3, 1892, in the village of Taragarh Talawa of Amritsar district in the state of Punjab in India. As he grew into adulthood, Thind began his collegiate studies at Khalsa College, Amritsar where he began to foster his academic interests. He then travelled to the Philippines where he worked orally translating languages for a brief period of time.

== Arrival in the United States ==
Bhagat Singh Thind arrived in the United States in 1913 to pursue higher education at an American university. On July 22, 1918, he was recruited by the United States Army to fight in World War I, and on November 8, 1918, he was promoted to the rank of Acting Sergeant. He received an honorable discharge on December 16, 1918, with his character designated as "excellent".

Thind originally arrived in Seattle upon his move to the United States in 1913. He arrived on the Minnesota, a boat that originated from Manila. He set out on the journey with his brother Jagat Singh Thind who died before they reached the United States. He partook on this journey as part of a migration of approximately 7,000 Punjabi men, many of whom left India to escape arrest for their involvement in the Indian independence movement against British rule. After his arrival, he moved to Oregon where he worked in lumber mills alongside a diverse community of European, Asian, and other ethnicities. Due to this history, Thind joined the Ghadar Movement, of which many of its earliest members, including Thind, were kept under surveillance by both British and American intelligence officials. Thind did not take part in the movement's actions against British rule in India, but remained a member of the movement and its messages throughout his life. U.S. citizenship conferred many rights and privileges, but only free white men and persons of African nativity or persons of African descent could be naturalized.

== First United States citizenship ==
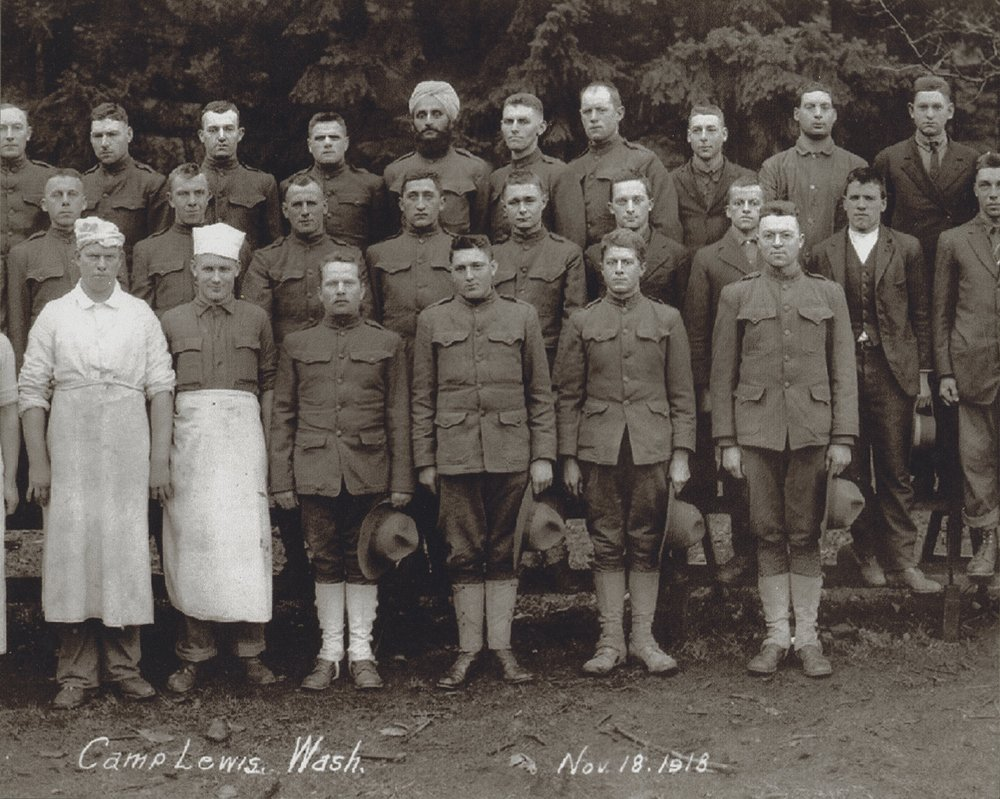
Bhagat Singh Thind with his battalion at Camp Lewis, Washington on November 18, 1918.

Thind received his certificate of U.S. citizenship on December 9, 1918, wearing military uniform as he was still serving in the United States Army at Camp Lewis, Washington. However, the Bureau of Naturalization did not agree with the decision of the district court to grant Thind citizenship. Thind's nationality was referred to as "Hindoo" or "Hindu" in all legal documents and in the news media despite being a practicing Sikh. At that time, Indians in the United States and Canada were called Hindus regardless of their religion. Thind's citizenship was revoked four days later, on December 13, 1918, on the grounds that Thind was not a white man.

== Second United States citizenship ==
Thind applied for United States citizenship again from the neighboring State of Oregon, on May 6, 1919. The same Bureau of Naturalization official who had revoked Thind's citizenship tried to convince the judge to refuse citizenship to Thind, accusing Thind of involvement in the Ghadar Party, which campaigned for Indian independence from colonial rule. Thind was among a small group of Indian immigrants whose claim to U.S. citizenship came under question because of their involvement in anti-imperial politics. Many of these immigrants were of more elite status and judges interpreted their caste status, completion of a college education, fluency in English and Western decorum, and networks with White citizens as evidence of their Whiteness. Judges and immigrants relied on ideas of caste purity, skin color, ancestral heritage, race science theories, and other constructions of race to distinguish race. The judge took all arguments and Thind's military record into consideration and declined to agree with the Bureau of Naturalization. Thus, Thind received United States citizenship for the second time on November 18, 1920.

== Supreme Court appeal ==
The Bureau of Naturalization appealed against the judge's decision to the next higher court, the Ninth Circuit Court of Appeals, which sent the case to the Supreme Court for ruling on the following two questions:

1. "Is a high caste Hindu of full Indian blood, born at Amritsar, Punjab, India, a white person within the meaning of section 2169, Revised Statutes?"
2. "Does the act of February 5, 1917 (39 Stat. L. 875, section 3) disqualify from naturalization as citizens those Hindus, now barred by that act, who had lawfully entered the United States prior to the passage of said act?"

Section 2169, Revised Statutes, provides that the provisions of the Naturalization Act "shall apply to aliens, being free white persons, and to aliens of African nativity and to persons of African descent."

In preparing briefs for the Ninth Circuit Court, Thind's attorney, Sakharam Ganesh Pandit, argued that the Immigration Act of 1917 barred new immigrants from India but did not deny citizenship to Indians who, like Thind, were legally admitted before the passage of the new law. The purpose of the Immigration Act was "prospective, and not retroactive."

On February 19, 1923, Justice George Sutherland delivered the unanimous opinion of the Supreme Court to deny citizenship to Indians, stating that "a negative answer must be given to the first question, which disposes of the case and renders an answer to the second question unnecessary, and it will be so certified." The justices wrote that since the "common man's" definition of "white" did not include Indians, they could not be naturalized.

Thind's citizenship was revoked and the Bureau of Naturalization issued a certificate in 1926 canceling his citizenship a second time. The Bureau of Naturalization also initiated proceedings to revoke citizenship granted to other Indian Americans. Between 1923 and 1926, the citizenship of more than seventy Indians was taken away. Thind's case also impacted other immigrant communities of Asian communities. It was cited by federal courts to target Afghan and other Asian communities as well as Mexican Americans.

== Third and final United States citizenship ==
Thind petitioned for naturalization a third time through the state of New York in 1935 after the Congress passed the Nye-Lea Act, which made World War I veterans eligible for naturalization regardless of race. Based on his status as a veteran of the United States military during World War I, he was finally granted United States citizenship nearly two decades after he first petitioned for naturalization.

== Death ==
Thind was writing a book when he died on September 15, 1967. He was outlived by his wife, Vivian, whom he had married in March 1940, his daughter, Rosalind Stubenberg and son, David Bhagat Thind. Two of his books were self-published posthumously by his son: Troubled Mind in a Torturing World and their Conquest and Winners and Whiners in this Whirling World.

He was nicknamed "Doctorji", and this was also the title of a 2010 biography of him by Amanda de la Garza.

== Writings ==
- Radiant Road to Reality
- Science of Union with God
- The Pearl of Greatest Price
- House of Happiness
- Jesus, The Christ: In the Light of Spiritual Science (Vol. I, II, III)
- The Enlightened Life
- Tested Universal Science of Individual Meditation in Sikh Religion
- Divine Wisdom (Vol. I, II, III)

=== Posthumously released ===
- Troubled Mind in a Torturing World and their Conquest
- Winners and Whiners in this Whirling World

== In media ==
NPR's Throughline podcast puts Thind's story in the context of Indo-European language theory, and its abuse to justify racist ideology in the 20th century. "The Whiteness Myth". NPR. February 9, 2023.

In 2020 the story of his Supreme Court case was part of PBS's documentary Asian Americans.

Thind was also discussed in Scene on Radio's series "Seeing White," Episode 10 ("Citizen Thind". June 14, 2017.).

== See also ==
- Indian Americans
- Sikhs in the United States military
