= Kartar Singh Duggal =

Indian writer (1917–2012)

- Born: 1 March 1917; Dhamyal, Rawalpindi District, British India
- Died: 26 January 2012 (aged 94)
- Writing career
- Language: Punjabi, Hindi and English

Signature
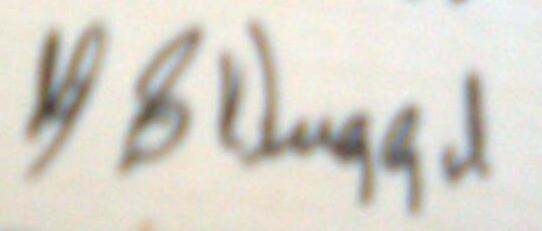

Kartar Singh Duggal (1 March 1917 – 26 January 2012) was an Indian writer who wrote in Punjabi, Urdu, Hindi, and English. His works include short stories, novels, dramas and plays. His works have been translated into Indian and foreign languages. He has served as director of the All India Radio.

He was awarded the Padma Bhushan by Government of India in 1988. In 2007, he was awarded the Sahitya Akademi Fellowship, the highest honour given by Sahitya Akademi, India's National Academy of Letters.

== Early life and education ==
He was born in Dhamyal, Rawalpindi District, (now in Pakistan) to Mr Jiwan Singh Duggal and Mrs Satwant Kaur. He was married to Ayesha Duggal (formerly Ayesha Minhaj), a medical doctor. He received his M.A. Honours in English at Forman Christian College, Lahore.

== Career ==
Duggal started his professional career with All India Radio (AIR). He worked there from 1942 to 1966 in various jobs including Station Director. For the AIR, he wrote and produced programmes in Punjabi and other languages. In addition, he authored a large number of plays and dramas. He was the Secretary/Director, National Book Trust, India from 1966 to 1973. From 1973 to 1976, he served as an Information Advisor at the Ministry of Information and Broadcasting (Planning Commission).

He has founded many institutions, including:

- Raja Rammohun Roy Library Foundation
- Institute of Social and Economic Change, Bangalore
- Zakir Husain Educational Foundation

Duggal had been a member of many literary and cultural centres including being the President of Punjabi Sahitya Sabha (Punjabi Literary Society), Delhi. He was nominated Fellow of the Punjabi University in 1984. He was also honoured with a nomination to the Rajya Sabha (Indian Parliament Upper House) in August 1997.

He died on 26 January 2012 after a brief illness.

== Work ==
Duggal has authored twenty-four collections of short stories, ten novels, seven plays, seven works of literary criticism, two poetry collections and an autobiography. Many of his books have been adopted by various universities for graduate studies. Among his works are:

=== Short stories ===
- Birth of a Song (in English)
- Come Back My Master (in English)
- Dangar (Animal)
- Ikk Chhit Chananh Di (One Drop of Light)
- Swere Sar
- Pipal Patea
- Nawan Ghar (New House)
- Sonar Bangla (Golden Bungalow)
- Tarkalan Vele (In the Evening)
- Jeenat Aapa(A Muslim girl)
- A Room 10'x 8'

=== Poetry ===
- Veehveen Sadi te Hor Kavitaavaan (Twentieth Century and Other Poems)
- Kandhe Kandhe (Shore Shore)

=== Novels ===
- Sarad Poonam Ki Raat (A Cold Full Moon Night)
- Tere Bhanhe (Your Wishes)
- Nails and flesh (1969)
- Man Pardesi (1982)
- Ab Na Bassoon ih gaon (Hindi-1996)

=== Other works ===
- Sat Natak (True Nanak) (One-Act Play)
- Band Darwaaze (Closed Doors)
- Mitti Musalmaan Ki (A Muslim's Earth)
- Philosophy and Faith of Sikhism, Himalayan Institute Press, 1988. ISBN 978-0-89389-109-1.
- Giani Gurmukh Singh Musafir, New Delhi: National Book Trust, 1999. ISBN 81-237-2765-8.

== Awards ==
Kartar Singh Duggal has been bestowed by many awards throughout his career, including:

- Padma Bhushan
- Sahitya Akademi Award
- Ghalib Award
- Soviet Land Award
- Bharatiya Bhasha Parishad Award
- Bhai Mohan Singh Vaid Award
- Bhartiya Bhasa Parishad Award
- Punjabi Writer of the Millennium, Award of Government of Punjab
- Bhai Vir Singh Award (1989) presented by the Vice-President of India for outstanding literary contribution
- Praman Patra (1993) presented by the Chief Minister of Punjab for outstanding contribution to Punjabi literature
- Sahir Award (1998)by Adeeb International (Sahir Cultural Academy) Ludhiana, India

He is well travelled. He has visited Bulgaria, North Korea, Russia, Singapore, Sri Lanka, Tunisia, the UK and the U.S. He resided in New Delhi after retirement and spent his time reading.

The Library of Congress has 118 of his works.

== See also ==
- Indian literature
- List of Indian writers
