= Luce–Celler Act =

1946 US immigration law

Citations
- Public law: Pub. L. 79–483
- Statutes at Large: 60 Stat. 416

Legislative history
- Signed into law by President Harry Truman on July 2, 1946

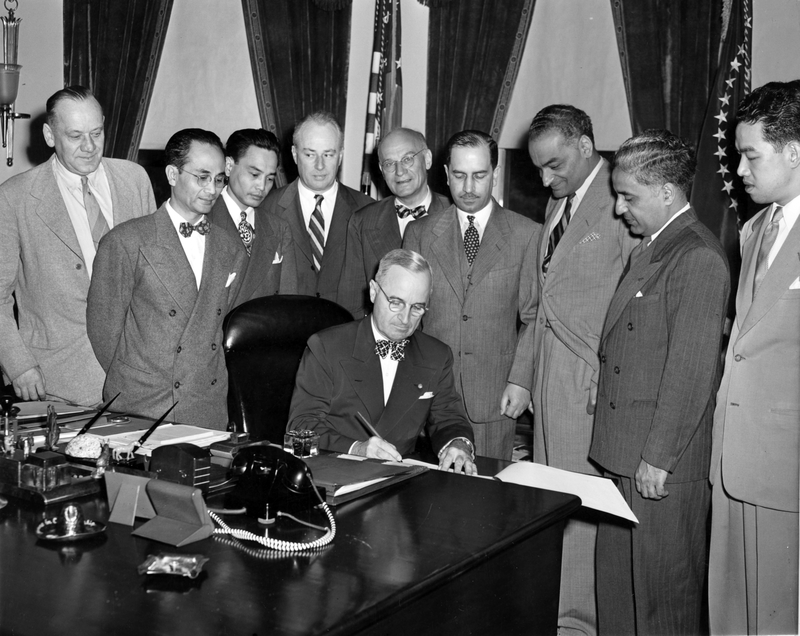
US President Harry Truman signing into law the Luce–Celler Act in 1946

The Luce–Celler Act of 1946, Pub. L. No. 79-483, 60 Stat. 416, is an Act of the United States Congress which set an immigration quota for Filipinos and Indians. The quota was 100 for each group. This was the first time people from these groups were entitled to naturalize as American citizens. Upon becoming citizens, these new Americans could own property under their names and even petition for their immediate family members from abroad. This Act was especially important because it recognized the rights of individuals who had previously suffered from discrimination. The Luce–Celler Act was one of the first cracks in the racist “Asiatic Barred Zone” and 1917 Immigration Act, which banned almost all Asian immigration. It followed the repeal of the Chinese Exclusion Act in 1943 (Magnuson Act)—marking a slow shift in policy.

The Act was proposed by Republican Clare Boothe Luce and Democrat Emanuel Celler in 1943 and signed into law by US President Harry S. Truman on July 2, 1946, two days before the Philippines became independent with the signing of the Treaty of Manila on July 4, 1946. Because of the imminent independence of the Philippines, Filipinos would have been barred from immigrating without the Act.

Prior to 1946, Indian nationals were not eligible to naturalize in the United States. They were also not allowed to obtain any form of permanent residency, a legal status introduced later under the Immigration and Nationality Act of 1952.

== See also ==
- Asian immigration to the United States
- United States v. Bhagat Singh Thind (1923)
