= Sikhs in the United States military =

Religious community in the US armed forces

Sikhs and Sikh Americans have served in the United States military since World War I through all subsequent wars. Since the 1980s, observant Sikhs have faced difficulty in serving due to a discontinuation of exemptions to uniform standards which previously allowed Sikhs to maintain their religiously mandated beards and turbans while in uniform.

== Sikh and Warrior Association ==
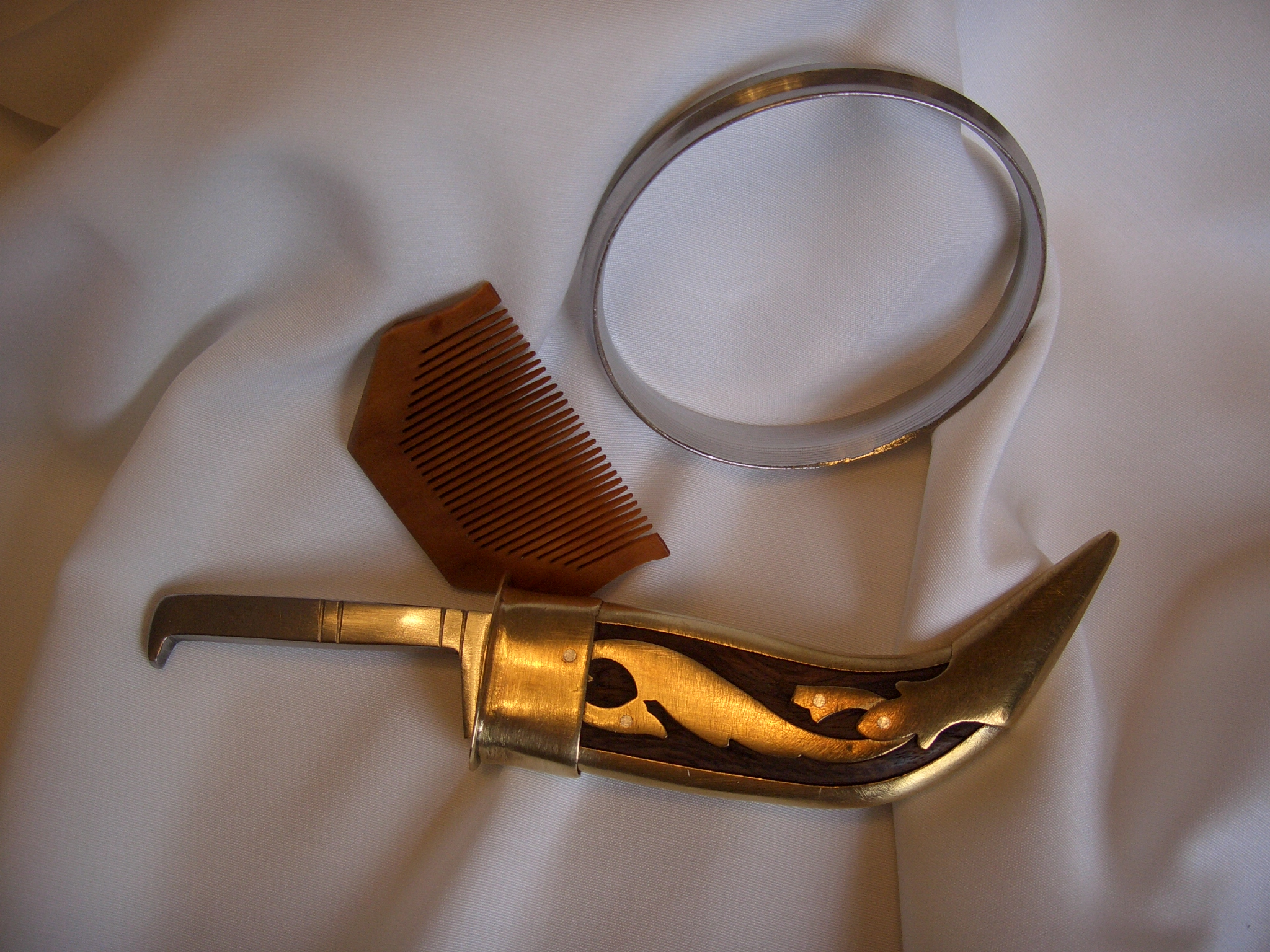
Three of The Five Ks in the Sikh Religion

Sikhs have the reputation of being valiant and effective warriors for reasons including their dedication to religion and to their personal values. A Sikh is expected to always carry five items on them to honor The Five Ks (Punjabi: ਪੰਜ ਕਕਾਰ Pañj Kakār), which is a foundational element of the Sikh religion. The five items include kesh (an uncut beard), kangha (a wooden comb), kara (an iron bracelet), kachera (cotton underpants), and kirpan (a small knife). Each of these five items serve as symbols that uphold integrity, discipline, righteousness, and honesty, which contribute to the resemblance to warrior characteristics. Besides the idea that Sikh's core values align with those of a warrior, their reputation for being good soldiers can also be traced back to Guru Hargobind, who was the sixth of the ten Sikh gurus in the religion. In the 1600s, Guru Hargobind emphasized the importance of a military. He created an army of Sikhs, trained them, and inspired them to defend and protect. He was a great influence on the core principles of the religion, as he formed an enthusiastic group of Sikh warriors. Additionally, the performance of Sikh soldiers in British service contributed to their strong warrior reputation. Sikh soldiers served with distinction in the presidency armies of the East India Company and the British Indian Army.

== World War I and World War II ==
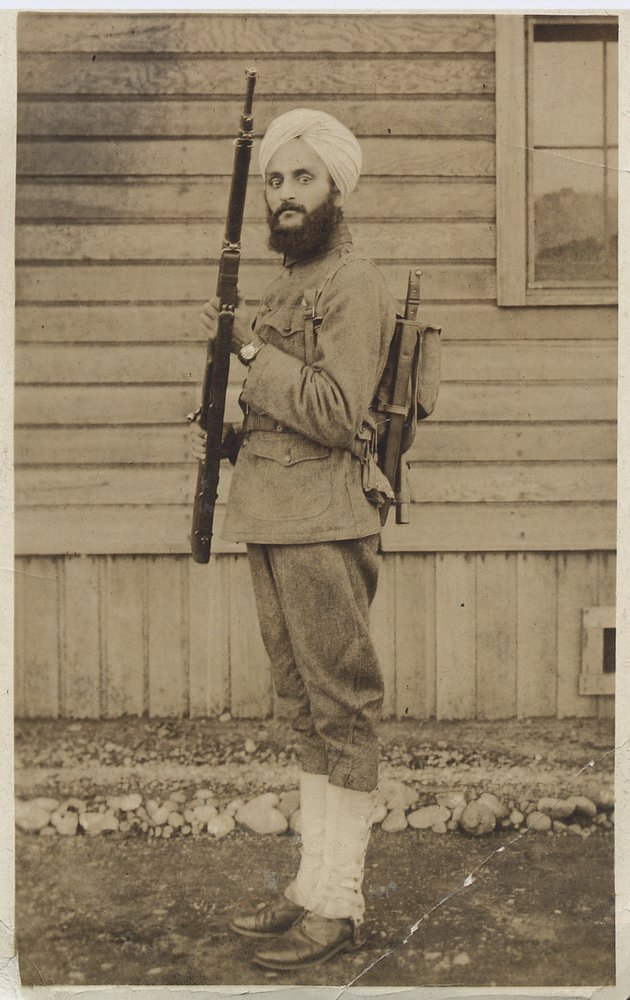
Bhagat Singh Thind soldier in U.S. Army during World War I in 1918

One of the earliest Sikh soldiers in the American military was Bhagat Singh Thind, who although not a U.S. citizen enlisted in the United States Army and served in World War I. Bhagat Singh Thind was the first Sikh in US military service to be granted the right to wear a turban while on active duty in the US Army. Thind requested citizenship at the end of the war, but was refused. He was granted citizenship in 1936. Sikh participation as a part of U.S. forces in World War I was limited due to their small population in the country, but 138,000 Sikhs served in other Allied forces. Large numbers of Sikhs served in U.S. forces during World War II, and all American wars following.

During World War II Sikh units of the Indian and Commonwealth forces served under Allied command alongside or in cooperation with American forces and earned a reputation for bravery, serving notably against the Germans and Italians in East Africa, North Africa, Italy, France, Western Europe and against the Japanese in the China-Burma-India Theater. Notable actions involving Sikhs fighting alongside American forces occurred at the Battle of Monte Cassino and the assault on the Gustav Line during the Italian Campaign where both American and Indian Army Sikh (as well as Australian, Canadian, New Zealand, Polish and South African) units suffered heavy casualties. Other notable battles of World War II that involved units composed of Sikhs included both the First and Second Battles of El Alamein, Kohima, Imphal, and the Burma campaign in conjunction with Merrill's Marauders.

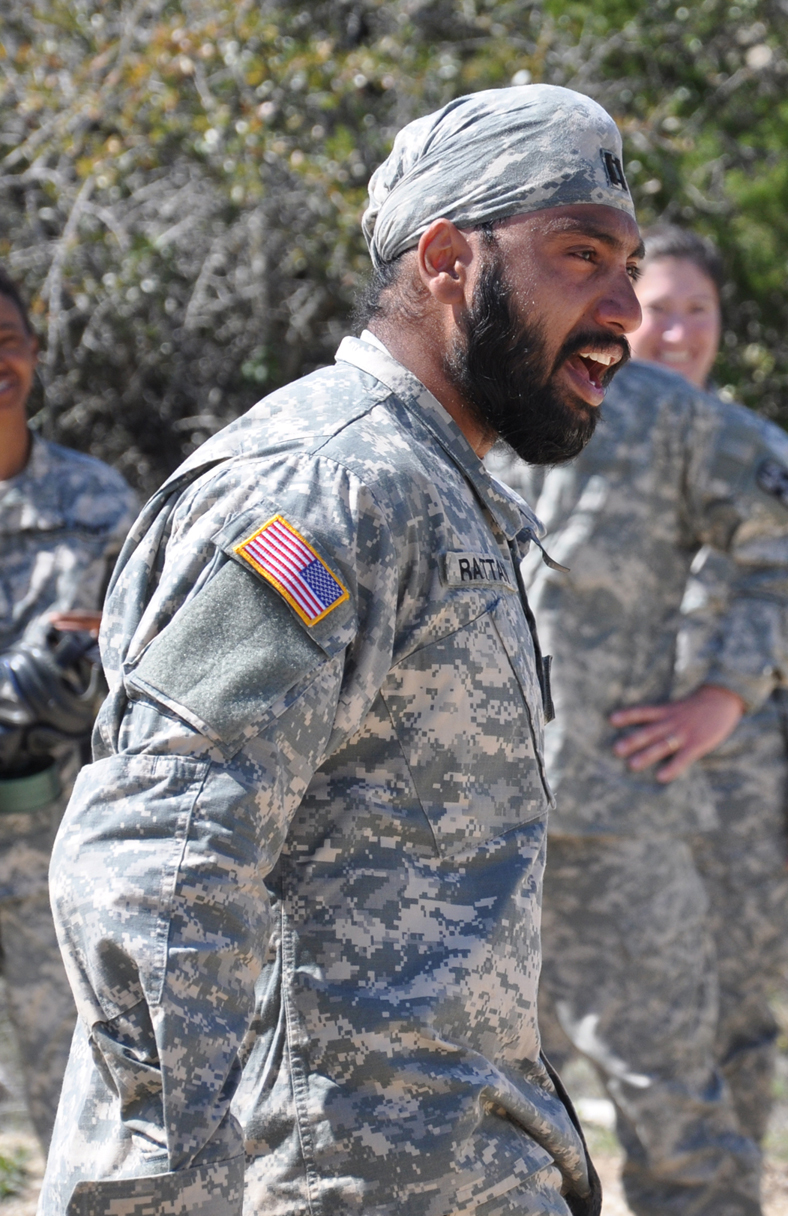
Captain Rattan, United States Army (2010)

== Restrictions due to uniform regulations ==
Prior to the 1980s—and from the time of Chief of Naval Operations Admiral Elmo Zumwalt's "Z-grams" numbers 57 and 70, in early November 1970 and late January 1971 respectively, permitting their presence on all United States Navy personnel until the timeframe of Ronald Reagan's presidency—the United States Armed Forces allowed beards while in uniform. However, due to a change in regulations, the U.S. Armed Forces rescinded permission for beards in uniform, except for those who commenced their service in the military before 1986. On July 26, 1948, Harry S. Truman, the 33rd president of the United States, made an effort to desegregate the military by issuing the Executive Order 9981. It stated that "...there shall be equality of treatment and opportunity for all persons in the armed services without regard to race, color, religion or national origin." Although this legislation aimed to permit the participation of all eligible American citizens in the military, Sikhs who wore turbans and long beards were forced to leave the military unless they removed their turban and shaved their beards. As the beard is a requirement according to the Rehat Maryada, the current regulation has created a regulatory barrier that has kept observant Sikh men from serving in the United States Armed Forces in large numbers. Retired Colonel GB Singh, applied to serve in the U.S. Army in 1979. Although there had been Sikhs who had enlisted in the U.S. Military previously, Singh was the first to go the officer route. A periodontist, Singh served in the U.S. Army as a colonel, one of a small number of Sikhs allowed to retain articles of faith, grandfathered in after a change in policy.

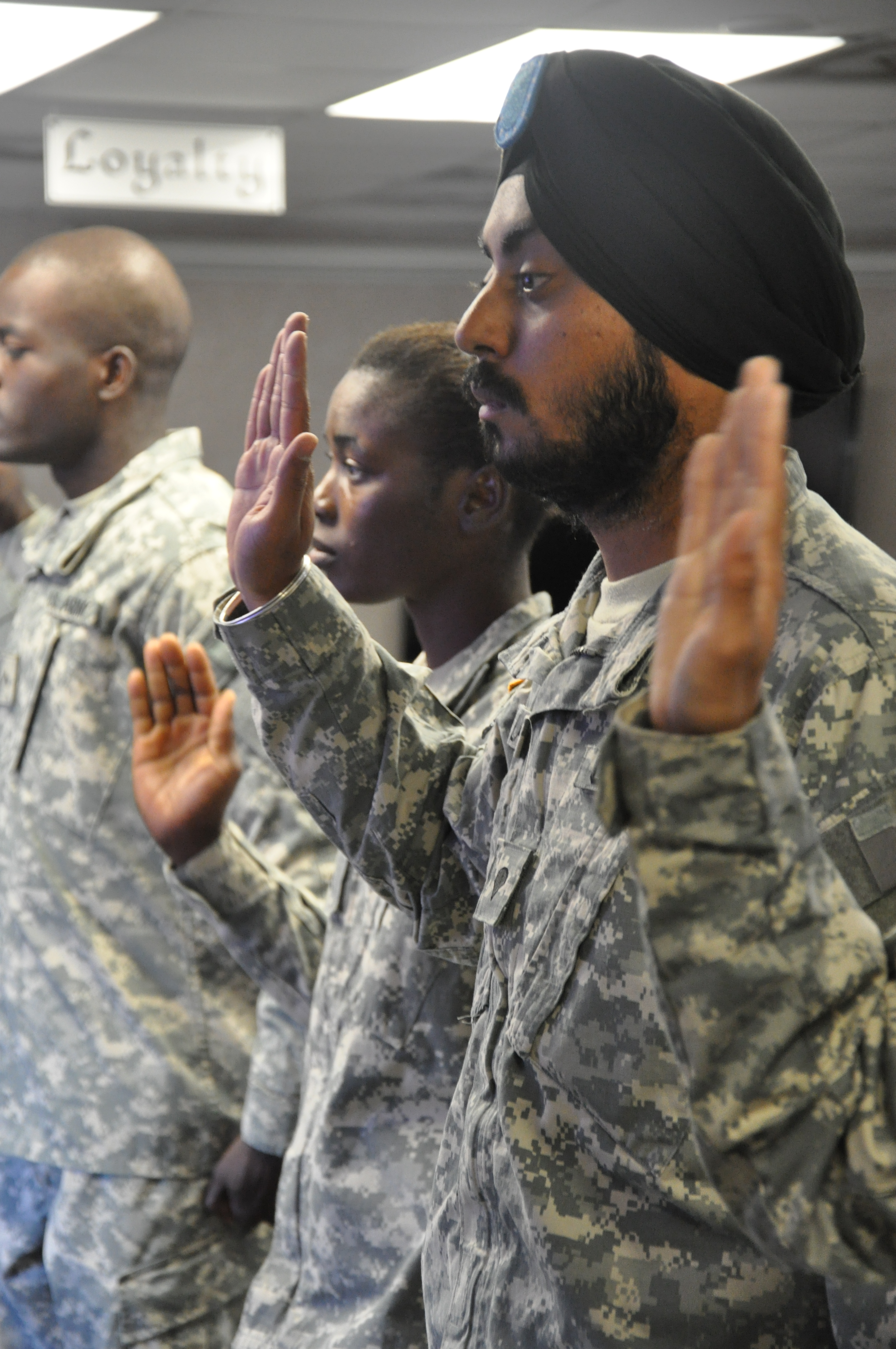
Specialist Lamba, United States Army (2010)

In April 2009, Sikh Army Captain Kamaljeet S. Kalsi, a doctor, with the help of the Sikh Coalition, filed an objection to the Inspector General and the Department of Defense to be allowed to continue to serve with his religious apparel intact. Army Reserve Second Lieutenant Tejdeep Singh Rattan, a dentist, joined in filing the petition. Kalsi joined the Army via its Health Professions Scholarship Program and had been reassured by the recruiter that wearing the uniform while retaining his religiously required appearance and apparel would not be a problem. Kalsi had even served in uniform without any problems at West Point and Travis Air Force Base. Yet, a problem arose in early 2009 when the Pentagon told Kalsi and Rattan that they would be called to active duty and would need to shave their beards and stop wearing their turbans.

The Sikh Coalition argued that not allowing the servicemembers to continue to maintain their appearance according to their religion violated the Religious Freedom Restoration Act of 1993. The Army argued that continued wear of the turban and beard violated current regulation, that would hinder the servicemembers from meeting health, safety, and mission requirements including the use of gas masks. In late October 2009, Kalsi was allowed an exemption to the policy, and would be able to serve while adhering to his religious beliefs. The Army continues to maintain that these were specific determinations due to the individual case and that present regulations will not change, however the Sikh Coalition holds out that this will be the beginning of a policy shift that will allow other Sikhs to serve their country in uniform.

The case of Rattan was put on hold, pending his completion of the dental boards exam. Upon graduation from basic officer training at Fort Sam Houston as a captain on March 22, 2010, Rattan was also granted an exemption. A third serviceman, Specialist Lamba, who graduated from Fort Jackson in November 2010 was also granted an exemption.

After a legal battle, Army Captain Simratpal Singh won a long-term religious accommodation in 2016 that allowed him to maintain the articles of his Sikh faith while serving. Specialist Harpal Singh (US Army Reserves), Specialist Kanwar Singh (MA National Guard) and Private Arjan Ghotra (VA National Guard) were also allowed to attend Army's Basic Combat Training in summer 2016. Specialist Harpal Singh received Soldier of the Cycle award from his chain of command at Fort Jackson, South Carolina. Not long after, in early 2017, the Army updated its regulations on grooming and appearances to allow Sikh soldiers and Muslim women to wear religious coverings, and for Sikh men to keep their beards.

In January 2017, following the outcome of a lawsuit under the Religious Freedom Restoration Act, regulations were changed, allowing for the wearing of beards and turbans by religious individuals (the same ruling also allowed the wearing of burkas and hijabs by Muslims). The ruling does stipulate that the regulations can require that the beards must be worn at certain lengths (via rolling and clipping) and must not interfere with operations.

In August 2018, Second Lieutenant Kanwar Singh became the first Sikh service-member to complete US Army's Officer Candidate School under the new military policy. He completed Basic Combat Training (Fort Jackson - 2016), Officer Candidate School (Massachusetts, Connecticut and Alabama - 2018) and Signal Basic Officer Leaders Course (Fort Gordon - 2020) with unshorn hair, beard, and turban. He currently serves as a Captain in the Massachusetts National Guard (US Army Signal Corps).

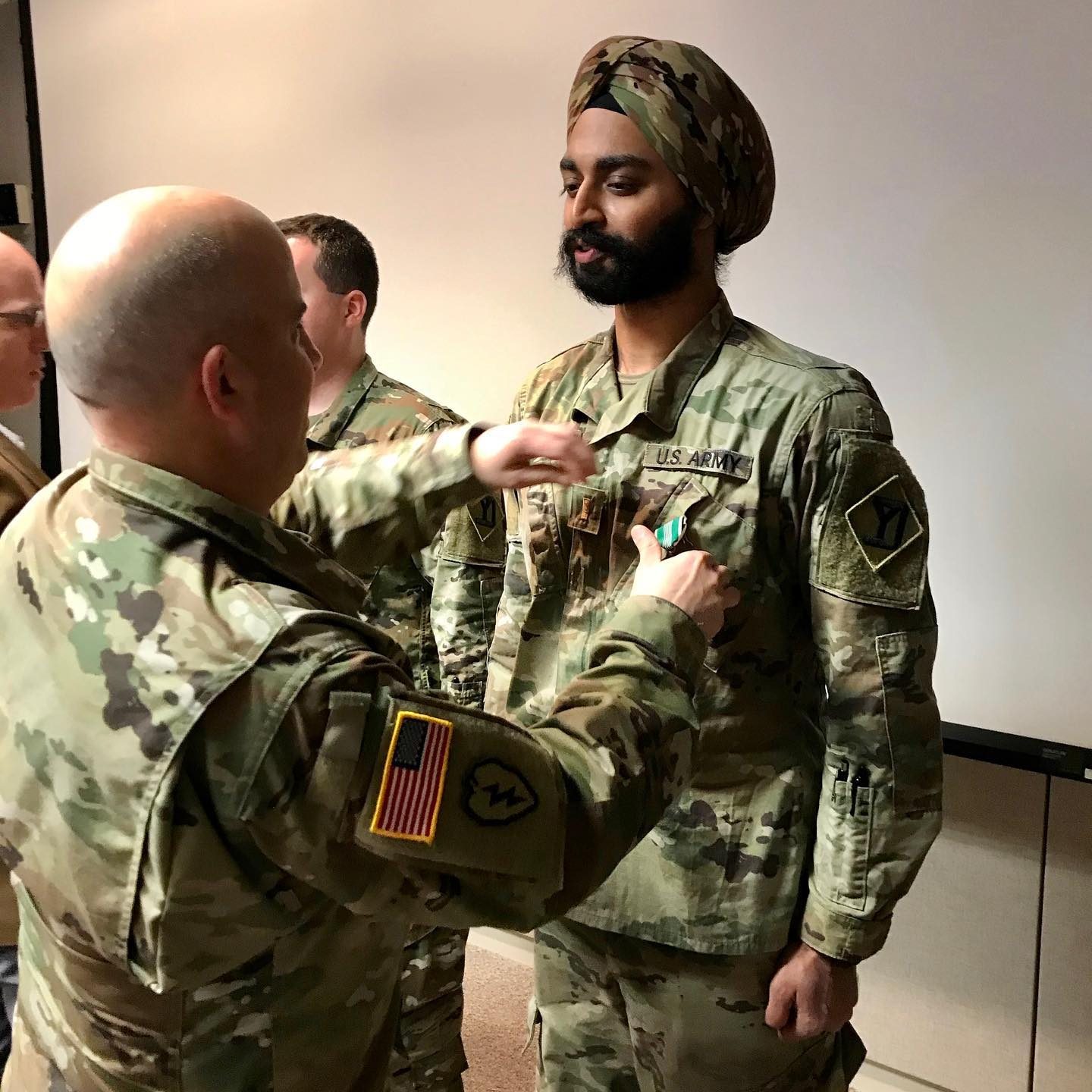
Lieutenant Kanwar Singh receiving the Army Commendation Medal from a General Officer, United States Army (2019)

In June 2019, Airman Harpreetinder Singh Bajwa became the first active duty airman allowed to serve with a beard, turban and unshorn hair as part of a given religious accommodation. Bajwa is a first-generation American who enlisted in the Air Force in 2017. Bajwa learned of exemptions granted to Sikh members in the Army, and that in 2018, the Air Force had allowed a Muslim JAG Corps officer, Captain Maysaa Ouza, liberty to wear a hijab. After hearing about Captain Ouza, he contacted Kamal Kalsi, a Lieutenant Colonel in the United States Army Reserve and founder of the Sikh American Veterans Alliance who helped him make his case.

In June 2020, Anmol Narang became the first observant Sikh to graduate from the United States Military Academy. In 2022, the District of Columbia's federal appeals court ruled that Milaap Singh Chahal and two other Sikhs were not required to shave to serve in the Marine Corps.

In 2024, after completing the 26.2-mile 2024 Boston Marathon military march in his US Army uniform and finishing in first place, US Army Captain Kanwar Singh raised awareness about veteran suicide by doing 22 push-ups at the finish line

In 2024, after completing the 26.2-mile 2024 Boston Marathon military march in his US Army uniform and finishing in first place, US Army Captain Kanwar Singh raised awareness about veteran suicide by doing 22 push-ups at the finish line.

== List of notable individuals ==
- Colonel G. B. Singh
- Sergeant Uday Singh Taunque, Iraqi War, Bronze Star, Purple Heart
- Sergeant Bhagat Singh Thind

== See also ==
- United States Air Force Chaplain Corps
- United States Army Chaplain Corps
- United States Navy Chaplain Corps
