= J. J. Singh =

J. J. Singh may refer to:

- Jas Jeet Singh, American politician
- Jagjit Singh (activist), Indian-American activist
- Joginder Jaswant Singh, governor of Arunachal Pradesh and chief of the Army Staff of India

== See also ==
- Jagjit Singh (disambiguation)
