= Kartar Singh Taunque =

Wing Commander Kartar Singh Taunque, then Hawai Sepoy 1st Class, became the first personnel of Indian Air Force (then the Royal Indian Air Force) to win an award for Gallantry for a successful bombing raid during "Operations in Waziristan 1937–38". He was mentioned in dispatches. Flt. Lt. Peter Haynes and Hawai Sepoy 1st Class Kartar Singh Taunque (later Wing Commander), as the air gunner/bombardier, conducted a daring bombing raid in Waziristan during the World War II operations.

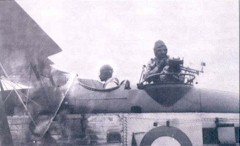
Wing Cdr. Kartar Singh Taunque

Peter Haynes and Taunque were flying Wapiti II Army Co-operation biplane during this sortie. Peter Haynes flew steady at a constant altitude as Taunque conducted precession bombing using 112-lb RL bombs and Mk.IX bombsight. This daring bombing sortie required tremendous courage and presence of mind on the part of Taunque for calculating terminal velocity, feeding speed and heading on the compass on-the-fly, and releasing 112-1b RL bombs at the enemy targets over the Pir of Ipi's fortress with pinpoint accuracy and devastating impact. He later served in Mesopotamia.

Taunque was the grandfather of Sergeant Uday Singh Taunque, who was awarded the Purple Heart and Bronze Star posthumously for showing gallantry in Iraq in 2003 as part of the US Army.

== See also ==
- Jagjit Singh Taunque
