= Simran Jeet Singh =

American educator, writer, and activist (born 1984)

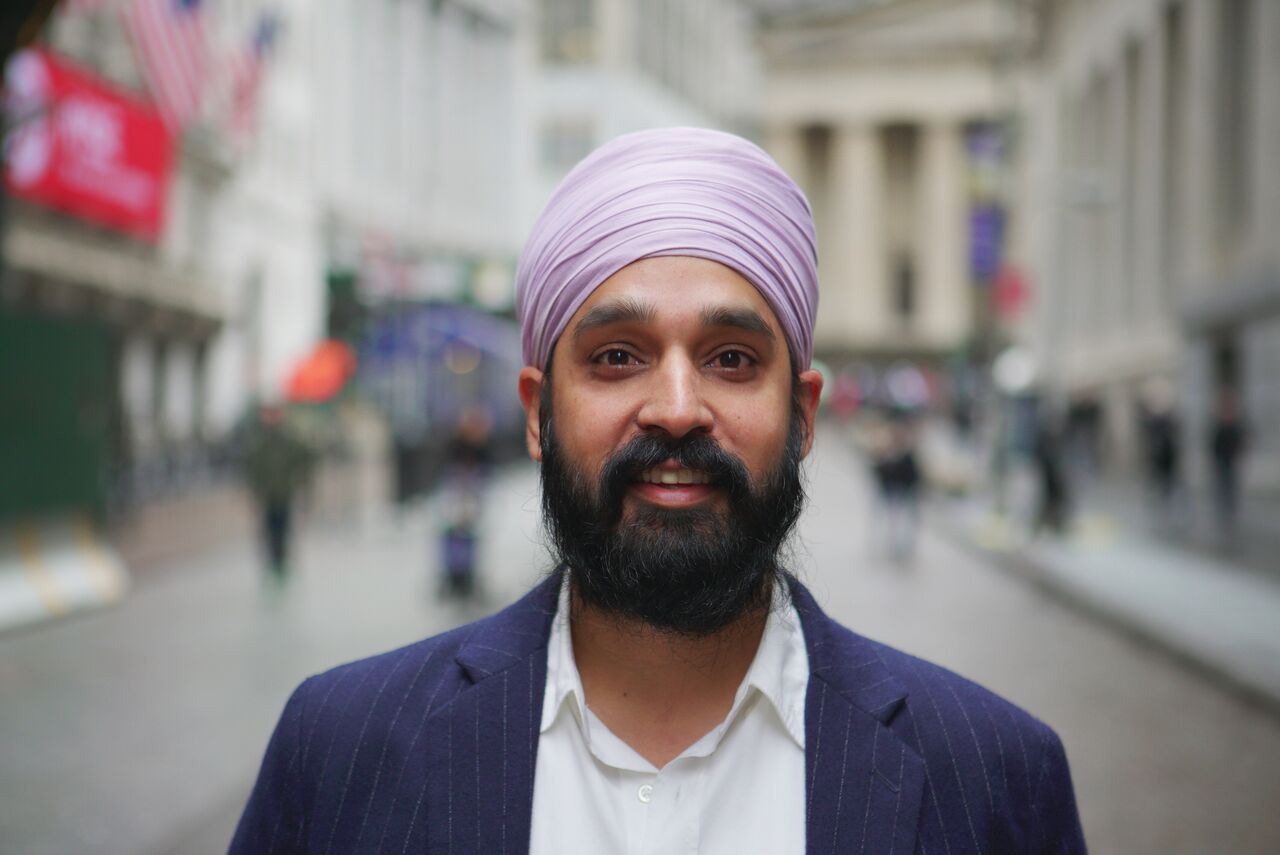
Image of Simran Jeet Singh at Wall Street.

Simran Jeet Singh (born July 25, 1984) is an American educator, writer and activist, who writes about religion and racism. Singh is the Executive Director for the Aspen Institute’s Religion & Society Program, a columnist for the Religion News Service, and a contributor for TIME Magazine.

== Early life ==
Singh was born and raised in San Antonio, Texas, and graduated from the local Trinity University in 2006. Following this, Singh attended Harvard Divinity School and then received his PhD from Columbia University in 2016.

Singh was a Luce/ACLS Fellow for Religion, Journalism, and International Affairs and a visiting scholar at New York University's Center for Religion and Media in 2017-2019. The Harvard Divinity School Alumni/Alumnae Council selected Singh as a 2018 Peter J. Gomes STB ’68 Memorial honoree, an award which "recognizes distinguished HDS alumni whose excellence in life, work, and service pays homage to the mission and values of Peter J. Gomes STB ’68 and Harvard Divinity School." He is also New York University's Sikh chaplain. He served on Governor Andrew Cuomo's Interfaith Advisory Committee for the State of New York and was named as a faith leader to watch in 2018 by the Center for American Progress.

In 2016, he received the Walter Wink Scholar-Activist Award from Auburn Seminary, which "recognize[s] courageous individuals who dedicate their lives to advocating for justice and peace in our world." He is a Senior Religion Fellow for the Sikh Coalition and a Truman National Security Fellow for the Truman National Security Project. Singh was the 2017–2018 Henry R. Luce Initiative in Religion in International Affairs Post-Doctoral Fellow at the Center for Religion and Media at New York University and an assistant professor in the Department of Religion at Trinity University in San Antonio, Texas from 2016-2018. He joined the Religion News Association Board of Directors in 2017, and became a featured columnist for Religion News Service in 2018. In 2023, Singh was featured as the opening speaker at SXSW in Austin, Texas.

He was the Dialogue Institute for the Southwest's 2017 Educator of the Year. In 2013, he received Columbia University's Presidential Award for Teaching by a Graduate Student.

Singh's debut children's book, Fauja Singh Keeps Going, tells "the true story of the oldest person ever to run a marathon," Fauja Singh. Singh's book includes a foreword written by Fauja Singh and illustrations from Baljinder Kaur. His second published work, The Light We Give: How Sikh Wisdom Can Transform Your Life, was published by Penguin Random House in 2022. The Light We Give received the 2023 Nautilus Book Award and was named one of the best books of 2022 by Publishers Weekly. Singh's writing was also featured in a 2023 anthology titled The Antiracist Kitchen, featuring recipes and stories about food, culture, and resistance.

== Sikh advocacy ==
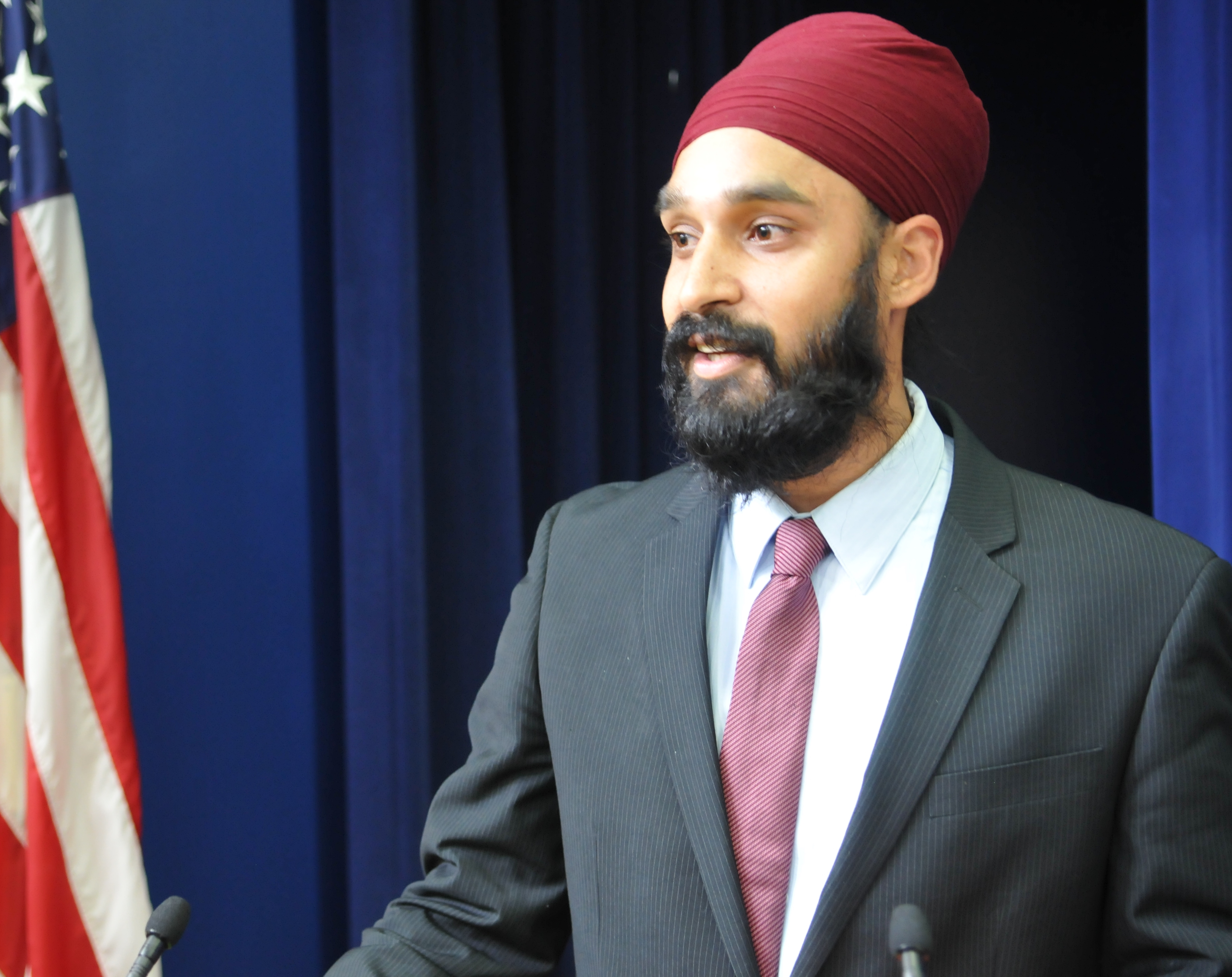
Simran Jeet Singh, delivering an address at The White House in 2014

Singh has addressed national audiences to promote awareness of Sikhism and its role in the contemporary United States. In 2014, he delivered a speech entitled "Guru Nanak at the White House" as part of President Barack Obama's celebration of Guru Nanak and Sikh Americans. In 2015, he delivered an address, "Seva Is More Than Service," as part of the Pentagon's second commemoration of Sikhs' service to American national security. In 2017, he spoke at the inaugural Obama Foundation Summit as part of a discussion on "Reimagining Faith and Civic Life in the 21st Century."

Singh is the author of Sikhism: A Reporter's Guide: a resource intended to help religion journalists report on the Sikh tradition. He appeared on NBC News' ''Life Stories'', discussing his multiple identities as an American, a Sikh, a Texan, a South Asian, and a Spurs fan. He also contributed articles on Sikh life to the Daily Beast. Singh talked to ABC News about Sikhs' struggle for acceptance and recognition on the fifth anniversary of the Oak Creek Temple mass shooting. He appeared as part of comedian Hasan Minaj's Daily Show sketch on distinguishing between Sikhs and Muslims.

In July 2017 the online platform Campus Reform reported that Singh had posed for a photo in which he made an offensive gesture to Trump Tower in New York City. (The photo in question was of another Sikh man wearing a turban.) Singh received threatening and hateful messages via social media in response to Campus Reform's article.

== Work for equity ==
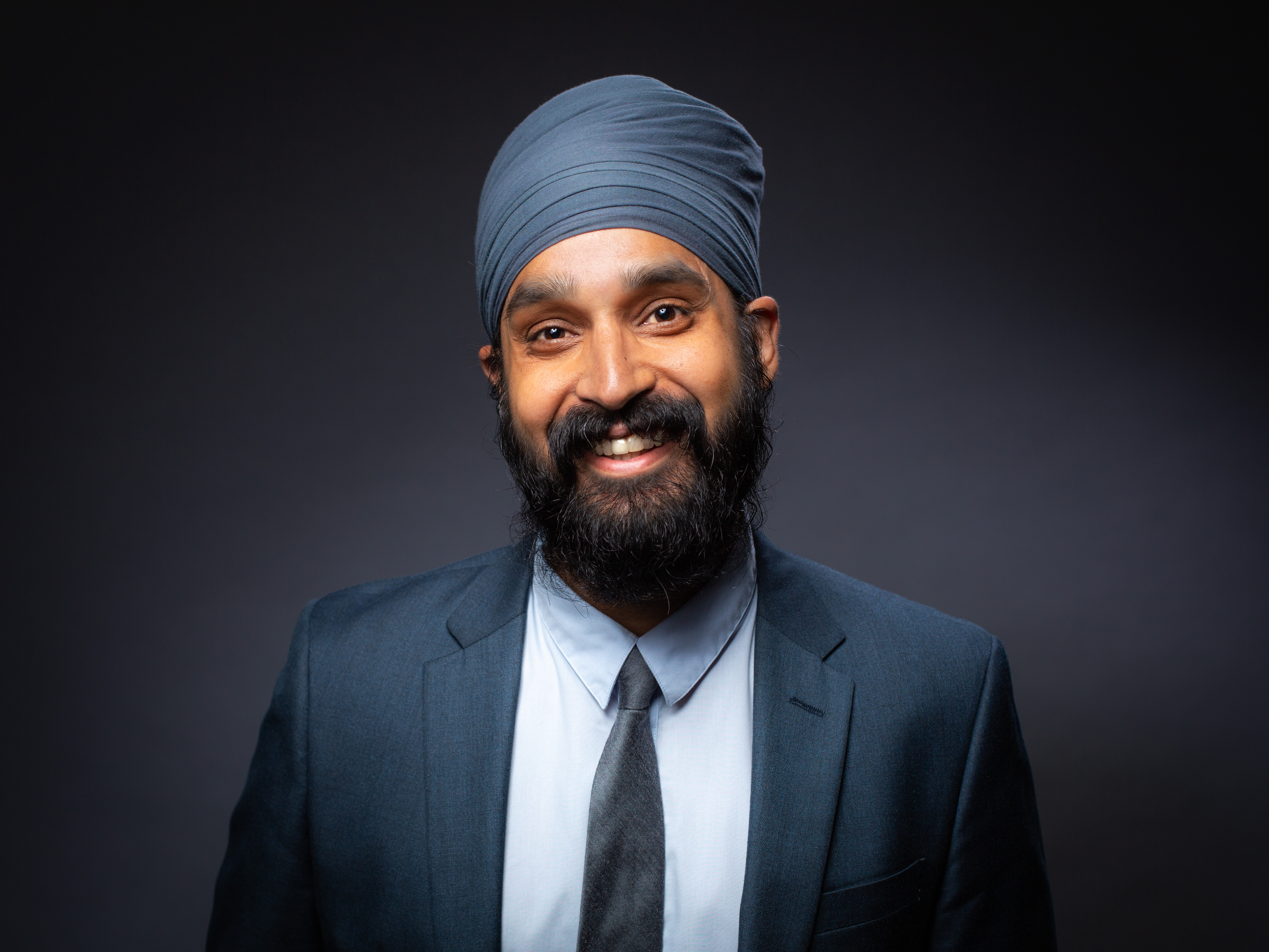
Simran Jeet Singh

Singh writes and speaks frequently on equity and justice, especially concerning religion, race, discrimination, and civil rights. He has written pieces on ending religious and racial intolerance in schools for Time Magazine, hate crime reporting for the New York Times, Muslim labor justice for the Washington Post, and media profiling of Muslims and Sikhs for the Huffington Post.

Singh drafted a boilerplate letter of support for Muslim Americans in response to the 45th president's executive orders limiting travel from Muslim-majority countries. Singh later spoke out against Islamophobic remarks made against him while he ran the 2016 New York City Marathon.

With Jasdeep Singh, a physician from New York City, Singh dedicated his participation in the 2017 New York City Marathon to Colin Kaepernick's efforts to oppose police violence and promote racial equality.

== See also ==
- Indians in the New York City metropolitan region
- New Yorkers in journalism
