= Sikhism in the United States =

Religious community

Sikh Americans

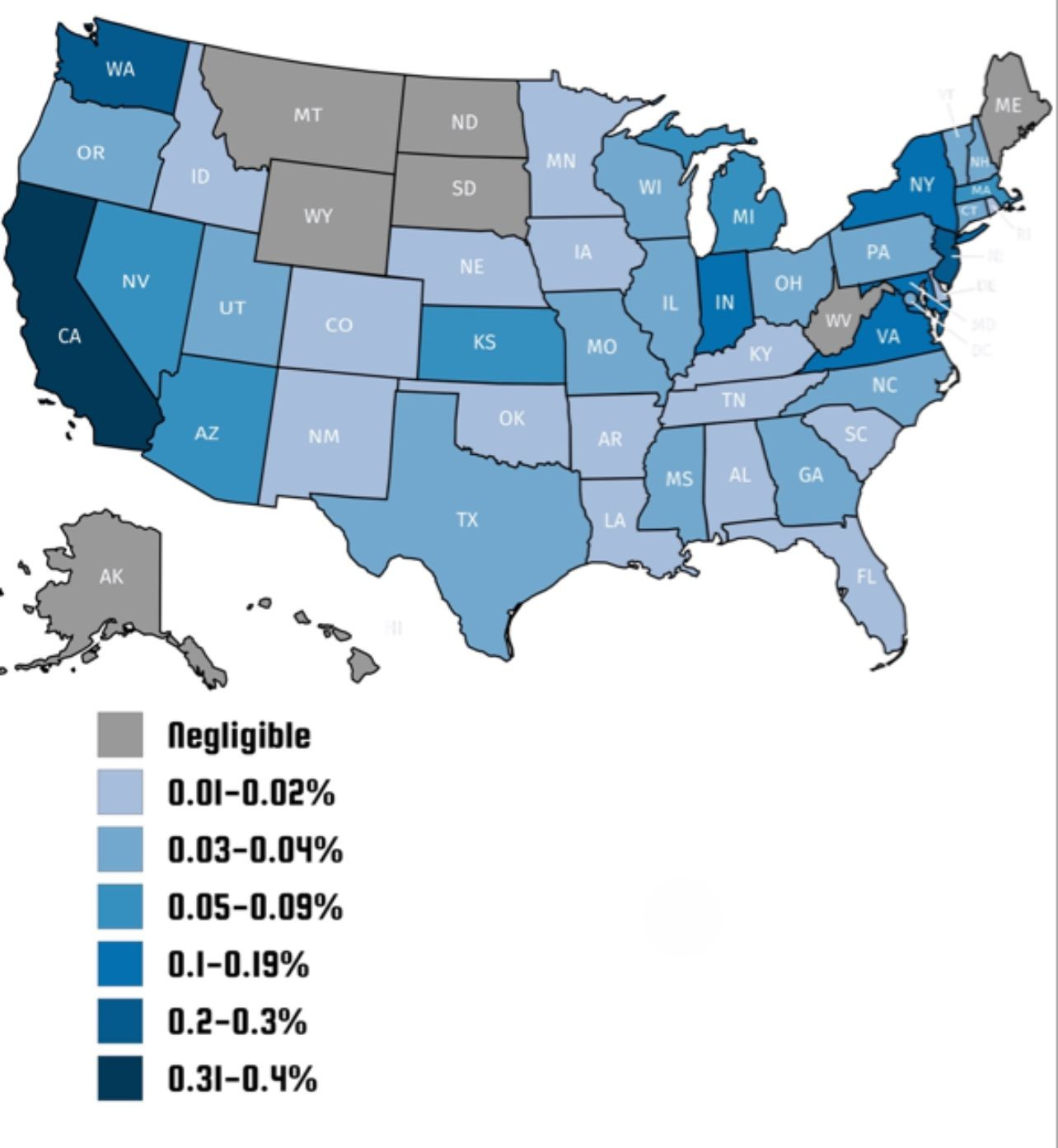
- Population distribution of Sikh Americans by state, 2020 census

Total population
- ~280,000–500,000; 0.08% of the total American population (2020 est.)

Languages
- American English • Punjabi and its dialects American Spanish • Indian English • Hindi • Urdu • Sindhi

Related ethnic groups
- Australian Sikhs; British Sikhs; Canadian Sikhs; New Zealander Sikhs; American Hindus; American Buddhists; American Jains

Sikh Americans form the country's sixth-largest religious group. While the U.S. Census does not ask about religion, 70,697 Americans (or 0.02% of the total population) declared Sikh as their ethnicity in the 2020 census. The U.S. Census Bureau cites the 2008 American Religious Identification Survey's estimate of the adult Sikh American population at 78,000. The Pew Research Center estimated the Sikh American adult population to be 140,000 and the total population at 200,000 in 2012 while the World Religion Database at Boston University estimated the Sikh American population to be at 280,000 in 2012. Sikh organizations like the Sikh Coalition and American Sikh Congressional Caucus estimate the Sikh American population to be as high as 1,000,000, but do not provide any sources for these figures; 500,000 nevertheless remains the most cited Sikh American population size. With 1% of Asian Americans being Sikh, and 90.7% of Sikh Americans being Asian American, the Sikh American population can be estimated at 200,000–300,000 in 2021. The largest Sikh populations in the U.S. are found in California (52%), New York (11%), and Washington (6%).

Sikhism is a religion, originating from medieval India (predominantly from the Punjab region of modern-day India and Pakistan) which was introduced into the United States during the 19th century. While most Sikh Americans are Punjabi, the United States also has a number of non-Punjabi converts to Sikhism. Sikh men are typically identifiable by their unshorn beards and turbans (head coverings), articles of their faith. Following the 9/11 terrorist attacks, and subsequent other terrorism related activities by Islamic groups, Sikhs have often been mistaken as Muslims or Arabs, and have been subject to several hate crimes, including murders. Sikh temples have also been targets of violence due to being mistaken for mosques. A 2012 shooting at a Sikh temple in Oak Creek, Wisconsin garnered national and international attention, with President Obama ordering flags to be half-staffed at all federal buildings.

== History ==
=== First immigrants ===
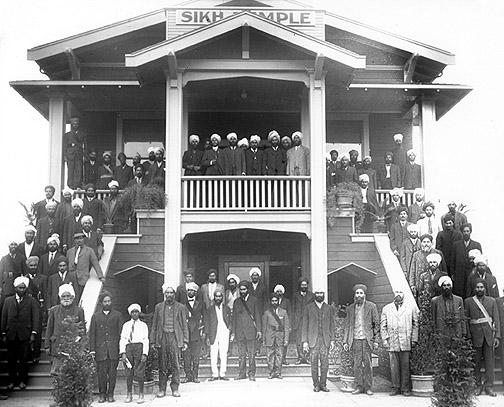
The Stockton gurdwara, the oldest in the U.S., opened on October 24, 1912.

Sikhs have lived in the United States for more than 130 years. The first Sikh immigrants to the United States started to arrive in the second half of the 19th century, when poor economic conditions in British India drove many Indians to emigrate elsewhere. Most Sikh immigrants to the United States came from the province of Punjab and came to the U.S. to work on agricultural farms in California, travelling via Hong Kong to Angel Island.

In the years just after 1900, hundreds of Sikhs had arrived to work in the lumber mills of Bellingham, Washington. In 1907, 400–500 white men, predominantly members of the Asiatic Exclusion League, attacked the Sikhs' homes in what is now known as the Bellingham riots. This quickly drove the East Indian immigrants out of the town.

Some Sikhs worked in lumber mills of Oregon or in railroad construction and for some Sikhs it was on a railway line, which allowed other Sikhs who were working as migrant laborers to come into the town on festival days.

A big effect on Sikh migration to the western states occurred during World War I and World War II, where Sikhs were recruited by the British Indian Army to serve for them. Sikhs fought bravely during these wars and began to live in England after their serving period. Among the Sikhs who already lived in America prior to the wars, many Sikhs joined them, mainly during World Wars I and II. Among those who served in the US military include Bhagat Singh Thind in World War I.

The first Sikh gurdwara established in the U.S. was the Gurdwara Sahib Stockton, in Stockton, California, which was established in 1912 by Wasakha Singh Dadehar and Jawala Singh.

=== 21st century ===
==== Rising discrimination ====
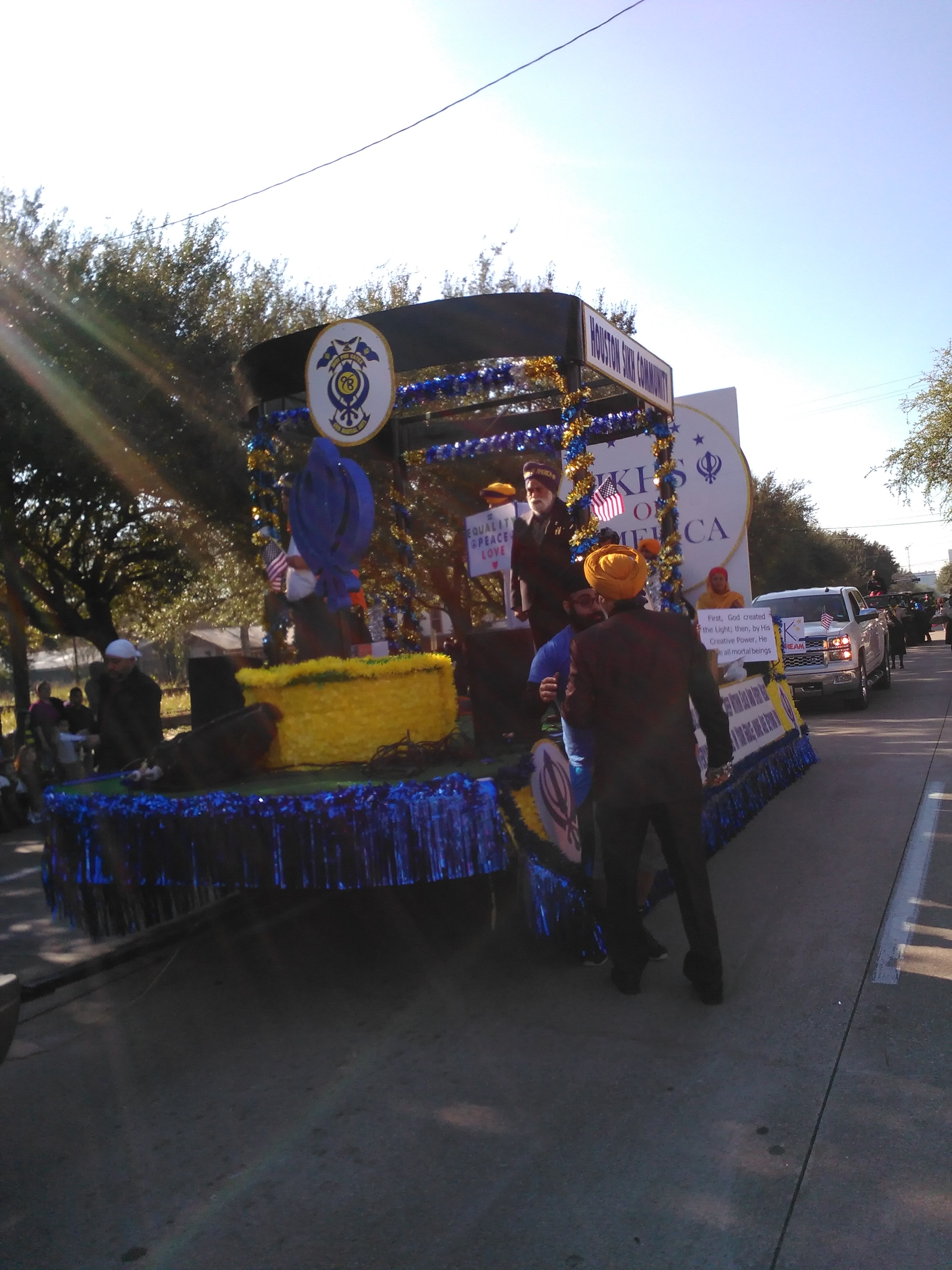
Sikhs of America parade float at the 2016 Martin Luther King Day parade in Midtown Houston

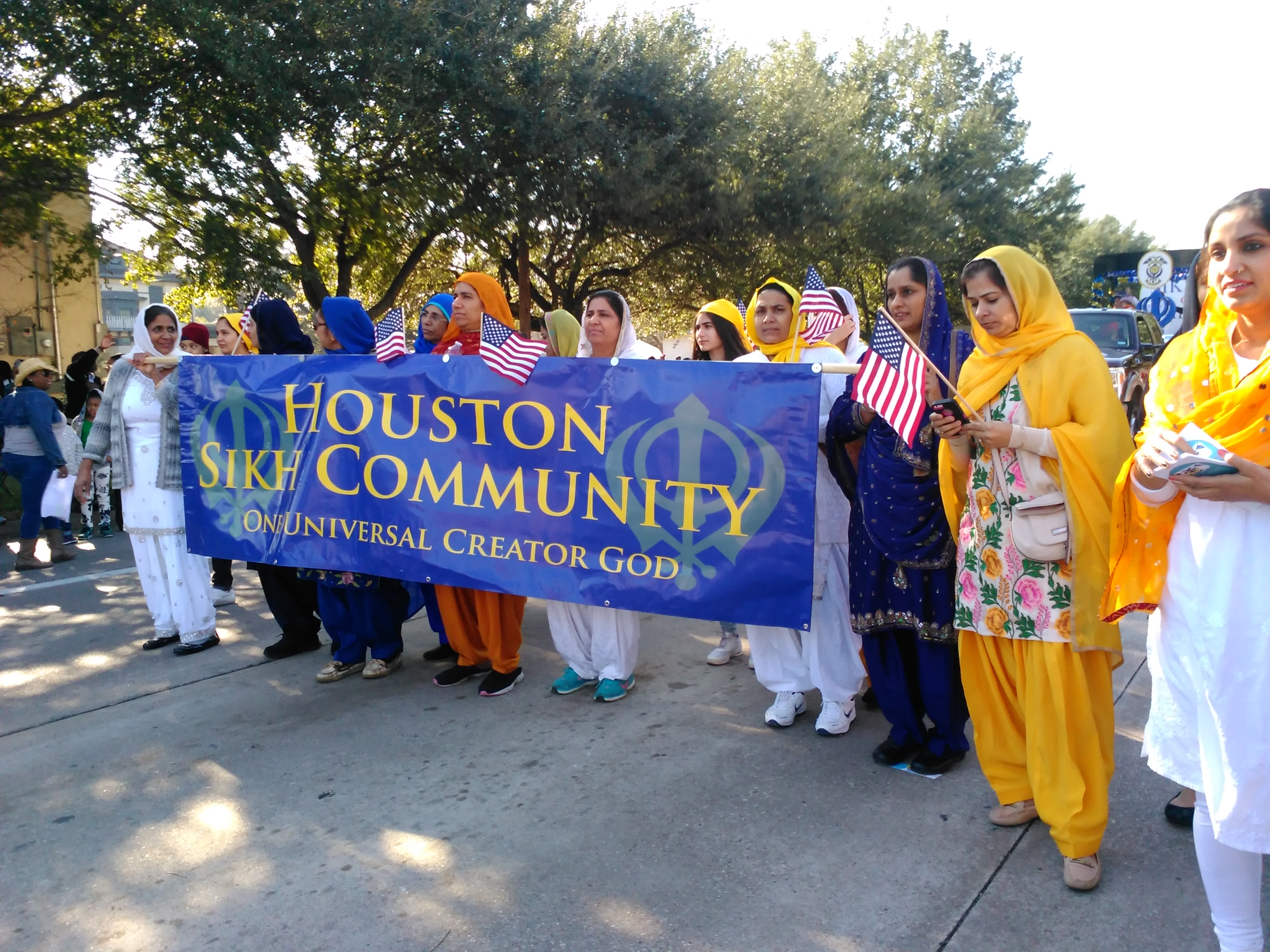
Houston Sikh Community at the 2016 Martin Luther King Day parade in Midtown Houston

As a result of the September 11 attacks, some Sikh Americans have become subject to discrimination, often from individuals who mistakenly believe that they are Arab or Muslim.

Balbir Singh Sodhi, a gas station owner, was killed on September 15, 2001, due to being mistaken for a Muslim. In a 2011 report to the United States Senate, the Southern Poverty Law Center reported several assaults and incidents of arson at Sikh temples after September 11. All were labeled as hate crimes that resulted from the perpetrators' misconceptions that their targets were Muslim. In August 2012, a Sikh temple in Oak Creek, Wisconsin, was the site of a shooting, leading to six Sikh individuals being killed. On May 7, 2013, an elderly Sikh man was attacked with an iron bar in Fresno, California, in a possible hate crime. On September 21, 2013, Prabhjot Singh, a Sikh professor was attacked in Harlem, New York, by a group of 20-30 men who branded him as "Osama bin Laden" and Terrorist".

A 2007 survey of Sikh students by the Sikh Coalition found that three out of four male students interviewed "had been teased or harassed on account of their religious identity." In 2014, the Sikh Coalition released a national report on the bullying of Sikh children in American schools. The report found that 55.8% of Sikh students surveyed in Indianapolis reported being bullied, while 54.5% of Sikh students surveyed in Fresno, California, reported being bullied. According to the surveys, Sikh students wearing turbans are twice as likely to be bullied as the average American child.

In 2011, two Sikh American grandfathers were killed while out for a morning walk in Elk Grove, California. This led to a national public outcry by the community, raising safety concerns for the city's 3,000 Sikh community members. The city completed the "Singh and Kaur Park" in 2021 to commemorate the lives of the slain men, and to raise awareness about the Sikh faith.

==== Historic firsts ====
In 2019, the United States Senate unanimously passed a resolution recognizing the importance of Sikh history, and contributions to American society. In the same year, Snatam Kaur became the first Sikh American nominated for a Grammy Award with her album Beloved.

In 2009, Kash Gill made history as one of the first Indian mayors and the first Sikh to be elected mayor in the United States when he took office in Yuba City. Additionally, the Charlottesville City Council (Virginia) appointed councilmember Satyendra Huja to the position of mayor in 2012, becoming the first turban-wearing Sikh to hold the position. In 2020, Elk Grove elected Bobbie Allen-Singh as its new mayor, making her the first Sikh woman to hold the position of mayor in an American city.

=== Converts ===
In the 1960s, due to increased Indian immigration and rising interest in Indian spirituality in the American counterculture, a number of non-Punjabi Americans began to enter 3HO. Prominent in this trend was Yogi Bhajan, leader of the Sikh-related movement 3HO (Healthy, Happy, Holy Organization), whose Los Angeles temple was the first to introduce non-Punjabi Americans to Sikhism.

=== Ethnicity of Sikhs in USA ===
An organization, United Sikhs led a campaign to have U.S. Census Bureau recognize Sikhs as a separate ethnicity, which was successful on January 6, 2020. As a result, Sikhs are regarded as different from Asian Indian category.

In USA, the Sikhs term themselves Sikh Americans even though they are mostly of Indian descent. In USA about 20% of the truck drivers are Sikh

== Demography ==
=== Generation status ===
Most Sikh Americans are immigrants.

Sikh American generation status (2020)
Generation status	2020	
Generation status	Pop.	%
First generation	163,992	58.5%
Second generation	100,638	35.9%
Third generation or more	15,979	5.7%
Total	280,329	0.08%

=== Occupations ===
==== Bhagat Singh Thind v. United States ====
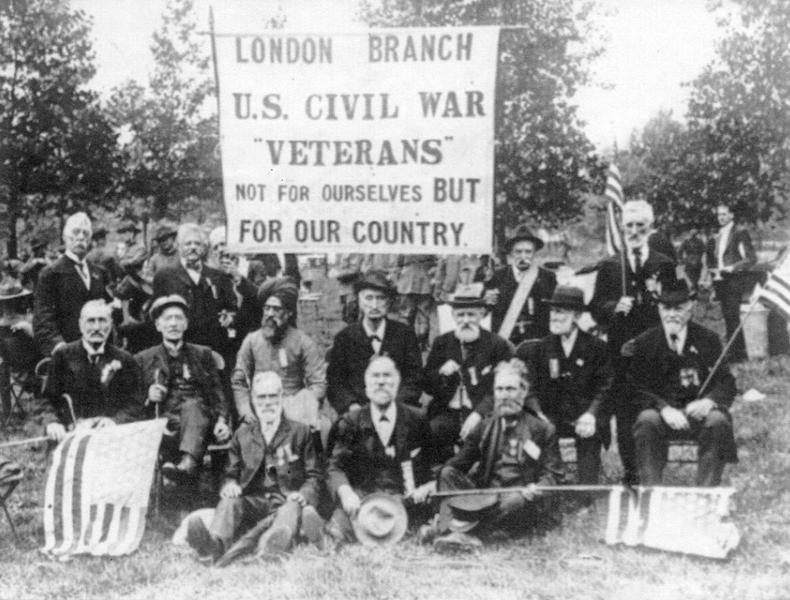
A gathering of British veterans who served in the Union Army during the American Civil War; a Sikh is present among them (c. 1917)

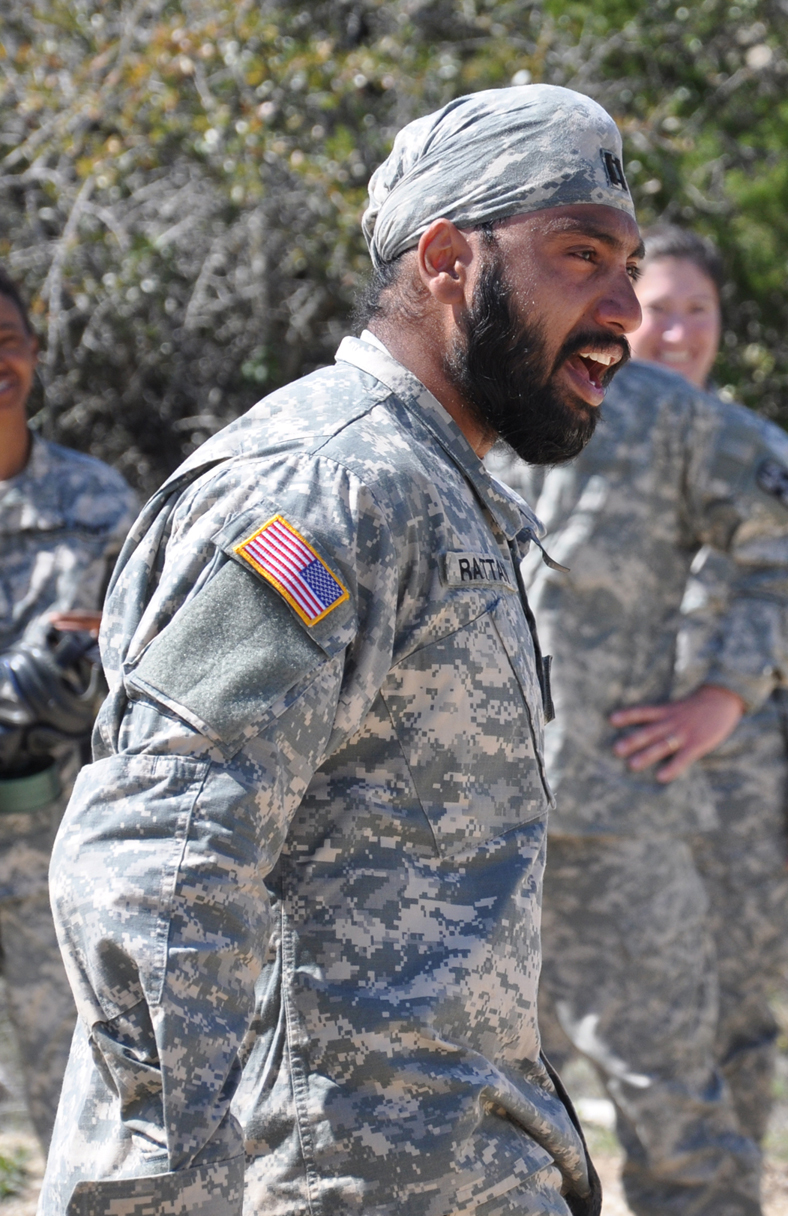
A Sikh-American U.S. Army officer (2010)

Sikhs have served in the United States military at least as far back as the early 20th century, when one Bhagat Singh Thind, who though not a citizen joined the United States Army and served in World War I. Thind requested citizenship at the end of the war, being granted and revoked twice, before finally being naturalized in 1936. Far larger numbers of Sikhs served in World War II, and all American wars following.

The ability of observant Sikhs to serve in the American military has, since 1985, been compromised by a discontinuation of exemptions to uniform standards which previously allowed Sikhs to maintain their religiously mandated beards and turbans while in uniform. As of 2010, a Sikh doctor, Kamaljeet S. Kalsi, and dentist, Tejdeep Singh Rattan, are the only Sikh officers to be permitted to serve in uniform with beard and turban. In addition, Simranpreet Lamba was permitted to enlist, with exemption to wear his turban and beard, in 2010 due to his knowledge of Punjabi and Hindi.

==== Military ====
In the federal appeals court in Washington, a preliminary injunction allowed two Sikh men to enter the military recruit training wearing a turban as it was considered an article of religion. The military recruits Milaap Singh Chahal and Jaskirat Singh sued the Marine Corps in April 2022 due to violation of the first amendment which allows the freedom of religion. The branch that they were a part of declined full religious exemption.

==== Policing ====
In 2016, the New York City Police Department (NYPD) began to allow turbans, subject to standards compatible with unimpeded performance of duty. In 2015, Sandeep Dhaliwal became the first Deputy Sheriff in Texas to wear a turban on duty (Harris County Sherriff's Office). He was shot and killed from behind in 2019 while conducting a routine traffic stop on the Copperbrook subdivision in Houston Texas.

In 2019, the Houston Police Department changed their rules to allow beards and turbans, joining 25 other law enforcement agencies.

==== Professionals ====
Many Sikhs started life in America working in lumber mills, mines, and as farm laborers, with many eventually becoming landowners. Many early Sikh immigrants were restaurant owners. In 1956, Dalip Singh Saund became the first Asian Indian-born person to be elected to the United States House of Representatives.

Today, many Sikhs are well represented in white-collar positions such as lawyers, doctors, engineers, accountants, and businesspeople. They are considered to be a successful ethnic group in line with most of the Indian community. The community has a higher level of education, as over 53% have received a bachelor's degree compared to 40% of the general population. This is also reflected in terms of income as over 75% of the community earns over $50,000 and over two-thirds of the population have incomes over $100,000.

==== Elected officials ====
- Dalip Singh Saund served three terms in the United States House of Representatives between 1957 and 1963. He was the first Asian American and the first person of a non-Abrahamic faith to serve in Congress.
- Preet Didbal was elected to the position of mayor of Yuba City, California in 2017. She is the first Sikh woman to serve as a city mayor in United States history.
- Balvir Singh was elected to the Burlington County Board of Chosen Freeholders, New Jersey on November 7, 2017. He became the first Asian-American to win a countywide election in Burlington County and the first Sikh-American to win a countywide election in New Jersey.
- City planner Satyendra Huja was elected mayor of Charlottesville, Virginia in January 2012.
- Amarjit Singh Buttar was elected in December 2001 to the Vernon, Connecticut Board of Education and won re-election in 2011.
- Ravinder Bhalla was elected mayor of Hoboken, New Jersey in November 2017. He is also the first Sikh mayor to wear a turban.
- Satwinder Kaur became the first Sikh elected to the City Council of Kent, Washington in November 2017.
- Manka Dhingra of Washington became the first Sikh woman elected to a state legislature in November 2017.
- Pargat S. Sandhu was elected as mayor of Galt, California on Dec 3, 2019. He became the first Sikh to be elected for City Council and Mayor for the city of Galt.
- In November 2020, California's Sutter County and Stanislaus County became the first two America to elect turbaned Sikh supervisors (Karm Bains and Mani Grewal, respectively).

== Geographical distribution ==
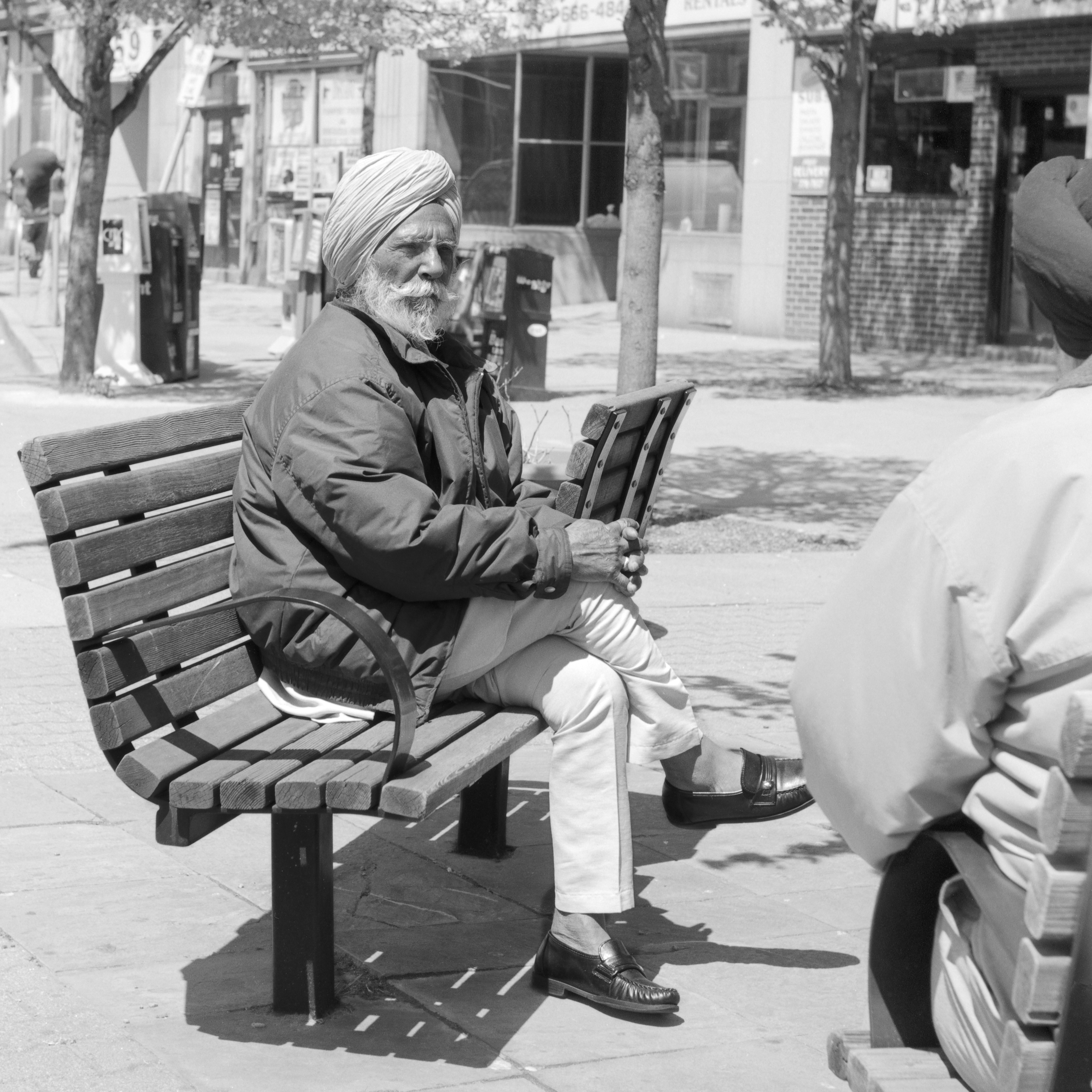
Members of the Sikh community of Somerville, Massachusetts

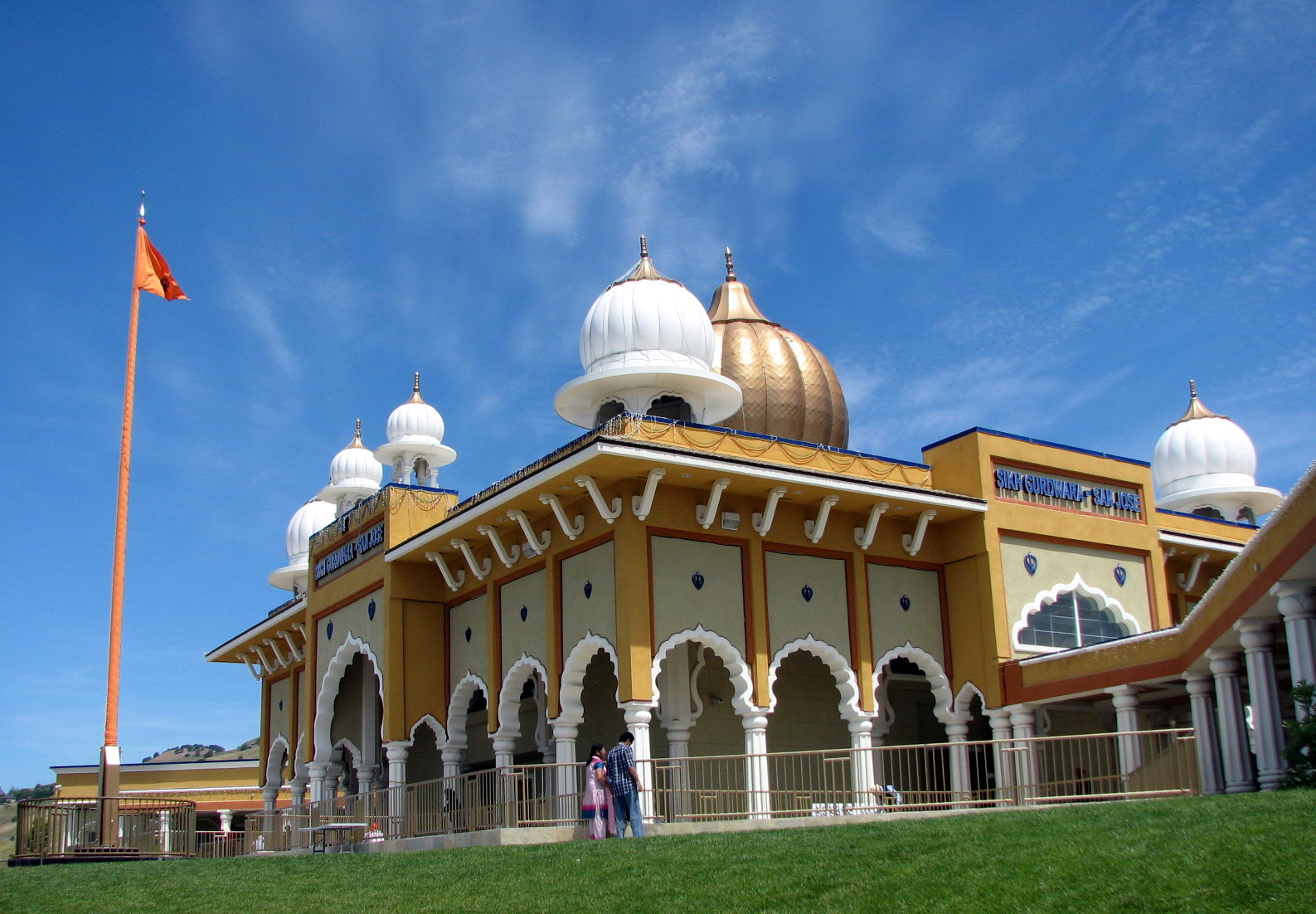
A gurdwara in Evergreen, San Jose, California

Over half of Sikh Americans live in California. Most of California's Sikh population live in Northern California, especially in the Central Valley and the Bay Area. The nation's largest Sikh population is in California's Central Valley, where Punjabi is the third most spoken language after only English and Spanish. Sikhs can be found across the Sacramento and San Joaquin valleys, but the largest concentrations can be found in the valley's largest cities (Sacramento in the Sacramento Valley and Stockton, Fresno, and Bakersfield in the San Joaquin Valley), and in smaller communities associated with the farming of almonds, peaches, walnuts, and plums. There are also significant concentrations of Sikh Americans in the Sacramento–San Joaquin River Delta and in the Bay Area near San Jose, California and Fremont, California.

In the Sacramento Valley, Yuba City and Live Oak have prominent Sikh populations, with the first Sikh arriving in Yuba City in 1906. In 2020, Yuba City was home to around 10,000 Sikhs (~15% of the city's population), while Live Oak was home to around 700 Sikhs (~8% of the city's population), with most of these being Sikhs. (Note: In the 2021 Canadian census, 194,640 Canadians declared Sikh as their ethnicity while 771,790 Canadians declared Sikh as their religion. Using this, the number of Americans with Sikh as their religion can be approximated using the number of Americans with Sikh as their religion.) Sutter County, California as a whole is home to around 11,000 Sikhs (~11% of the county population); this makes Sutter County the most proportionally Sikh county in America. Down south in the San Joaquin Valley, Livingston is home to around 2,500 Sikhs (~17% of the city's population); Livingston is the most proportionally Sikh municipality in America.

The New York metropolitan area also has a significant Sikh American presence. Around 19,000 Sikhs live in New York City, with around 18,000 in Queens. The Richmond Hill neighborhood of Queens is often referred to as "Little Punjab" due to its large Punjabi population. In 2020, the stretch of 101st Avenue between 111th and 123rd streets in Richmond Hill was renamed Punjab Avenue (ਪੰਜਾਬ ਐਵੇਨਿਊ) and the stretch of 97th Avenue between Lefferts Boulevard and 117th Street was renamed Gurdwara Street. Outside of the city, the suburbs of Hicksville in Long Island and Carteret in Central Jersey have significant Punjabi populations. In 2020, Carteret was home to around 3,000 Sikhs (~12% of the borough's population) while Hicksville was home to around 2,000 (~5% of the hamlet's population).

Outside of California and the New York metropolitan area, there are significant populations of Punjabi Sikhs in Washington, Indiana, Texas, Florida, Georgia, Virginia, Maryland, Massachusetts and North Carolina. There is also a concentration of non-Punjabi converts to Sikhism in Española, New Mexico.

=== States and territories ===
Sikh Americans by state or territory (2020)
State or territory	Sikh alone		Sikh alone or in any combination		Total Sikh population (derived estimate) (Note: In the 2021 Canadian census, 194,640 Canadians declared Sikh as their ethnicity while 771,790 Canadians declared Sikh as their religion. Using this, the number of Americans with Sikh as their religion can be approximated using the number of Americans with Sikh as their religion)	
State or territory	Pop.	%	Pop.	%	Pop.	%
Alabama	29	0%	41	0%	163	0%
Alaska	3	0%	4	0%	16	0%
Arizona	403	0.01%	549	0.01%	2,177	0.03%
Arkansas	22	0%	46	0%	182	0.01%
California	25,037	0.06%	36,975	0.09%	146,614	0.37%
Colorado	223	0%	334	0.01%	1,324	0.02%
Connecticut	260	0.01%	359	0.01%	1,424	0.04%
Delaware	69	0.01%	88	0.01%	349	0.04%
(Washington, D.C.) District of Columbia	7	0%	19	0%	75	0.01%
Florida	421	0%	595	0%	2,359	0.01%
(Georgia (U.S. state)) Georgia	390	0%	548	0.01%	2,173	0.02%
Hawaii	N/A	N/A	0	0%	0	0%
Idaho	8	0%	11	0%	44	0%
Illinois	840	0.01%	1,283	0.01%	5,087	0.04%
Indiana	1,283	0.02%	1,718	0.03%	6,812	0.1%
Iowa	33	0%	61	0%	242	0.01%
Kansas	99	0%	174	0.01%	690	0.02%
Kentucky	25	0%	46	0%	182	0%
Louisiana	56	0%	86	0%	341	0.01%
Maine	N/A	N/A	23	0%	91	0.01%
Maryland	734	0.01%	1,012	0.02%	4,013	0.06%
Massachusetts	452	0.01%	600	0.01%	2,379	0.03%
Michigan	981	0.01%	1,465	0.01%	5,809	0.06%
Minnesota	74	0%	115	0%	456	0.01%
Mississippi	77	0%	116	0%	460	0.02%
Missouri	75	0%	131	0%	519	0.01%
Montana	0	0%	4	0%	16	0%
Nebraska	4	0%	7	0%	28	0%
Nevada	147	0%	282	0.01%	1,118	0.04%
New Hampshire	14	0%	36	0%	143	0.01%
New Jersey	2,715	0.03%	3,888	0.04%	15,417	0.17%
New Mexico	18	0%	37	0%	147	0.01%
(New York (state)) New York	5,587	0.03%	7,943	0.04%	31,496	0.16%
North Carolina	206	0%	361	0%	1,431	0.01%
North Dakota	N/A	N/A	0	0%	0	0%
Ohio	569	0%	887	0.01%	3,517	0.03%
Oklahoma	42	0%	48	0%	190	0%
Oregon	204	0%	285	0.01%	1,130	0.03%
Pennsylvania	759	0.01%	1,098	0.01%	4,354	0.03%
Puerto Rico	N/A	N/A	0	0%	0	0%
Rhode Island	N/A	N/A	3	0%	12	0%
South Carolina	42	0%	97	0%	385	0.01%
South Dakota	0	0%	1	0%	4	0%
Tennessee	48	0%	73	0%	289	0%
Texas	1,918	0.01%	2,718	0.01%	10,777	0.04%
Utah	62	0%	92	0%	365	0.01%
Vermont	3	0%	3	0%	12	0%
Virginia	1,157	0.01%	1,713	0.02%	6,792	0.08%
(Washington (state)) Washington	3,002	0.04%	4,367	0.06%	17,316	0.22%
West Virginia	6	0%	7	0%	28	0%
Wisconsin	185	0%	356	0.01%	1,412	0.02%
Wyoming	N/A	N/A	3	0%	12	0%
United States	48,321	0.01%	70,697	0.02%	280,329	0.08%

=== Counties ===
Sikh Americans by county (2020)
County	State	Sikh alone		Sikh alone or in any combination		Total Sikh population (derived estimate) (Note: In the 2021 Canadian census, 194,640 Canadians declared Sikh as their ethnicity while 771,790 Canadians declared Sikh as their religion. Using this, the number of Americans with Sikh as their religion can be approximated using the number of Americans with Sikh as their religion)	
County	State	Pop.	%	Pop.	%	Pop.	%
Fresno	California	3,603	0.36%	5,297	0.53%	21,004	2.08%
Queens	(New York (state)) New York	3,110	0.13%	4,456	0.19%	17,669	0.73%
San Joaquin	California	2,758	0.35%	4,026	0.52%	15,964	2.05%
Sacramento	California	2,595	0.16%	4,015	0.25%	15,920	1%
Alameda	California	2,582	0.15%	3,689	0.22%	14,628	0.87%
Santa Clara	California	2,200	0.11%	3,078	0.16%	12,205	0.63%
King	(Washington (state)) Washington	2,003	0.09%	2,900	0.13%	11,499	0.51%
Sutter	California	1,990	2%	2,812	2.82%	11,150	11.19%
Kern	California	1,395	0.15%	2,207	0.24%	8,751	0.96%
Nassau	(New York (state)) New York	1,432	0.1%	2,137	0.15%	8,474	0.61%
Los Angeles	California	1,117	0.01%	1,710	0.02%	6,781	0.07%
Stanislaus	California	1,058	0.19%	1,595	0.29%	6,325	1.14%
Middlesex	New Jersey	1,122	0.13%	1,553	0.18%	6,158	0.71%
Contra Costa	California	839	0.07%	1,304	0.11%	5,171	0.44%
Merced	California	699	0.25%	1,027	0.37%	4,072	1.45%
Placer	California	536	0.13%	859	0.21%	3,406	0.84%
Harris	Texas	606	0.01%	836	0.02%	3,315	0.07%
Orange	California	555	0.02%	781	0.02%	3,097	0.1%
Riverside	California	433	0.02%	671	0.03%	2,661	0.11%
San Bernardino	California	409	0.02%	630	0.03%	2,498	0.11%
Collin	Texas	427	0.04%	618	0.06%	2,451	0.23%
Solano	California	452	0.1%	614	0.14%	2,435	0.54%
Fairfax	Virginia	436	0.04%	571	0.05%	2,264	0.2%
Wayne	Michigan	359	0.02%	558	0.03%	2,213	0.12%
Bergen	New Jersey	417	0.04%	553	0.06%	2,193	0.23%
Maricopa	Arizona	393	0.01%	543	0.01%	2,153	0.05%
Johnson	Indiana	403	0.25%	534	0.33%	2,117	1.31%
Loudoun	Virginia	343	0.08%	524	0.12%	2,078	0.49%
Cook	Illinois	328	0.01%	520	0.01%	2,062	0.04%
Snohomish	(Washington (state)) Washington	313	0.04%	492	0.06%	1,951	0.24%
Total	United States	48,321	0.01%	70,697	0.02%	280,329	0.08%

=== Places ===
Sikh Americans by census-designated place (2020)
CDP	State	Sikh alone		Total Sikh population (derived estimate) (Note: In the 2021 Canadian census, 194,640 Canadians declared Sikh as their ethnicity while 771,790 Canadians declared Sikh as their religion. Using this, the number of Americans with Sikh as their religion can be approximated using the number of Americans with Sikh as their religion)	
CDP	State	Pop.	%	Pop.	%
New York	(New York (state)) New York	3,293	0.04%	19,104	0.22%
Fresno	California	2,369	0.44%	13,743	2.54%
Yuba City	California	1,757	2.51%	10,193	14.54%
San Jose	California	1,467	0.14%	8,511	0.84%
Bakersfield	California	1,352	0.34%	7,843	1.94%
Sacramento	California	966	0.18%	5,604	1.07%
Kent	(Washington (state)) Washington	952	0.7%	5,523	4.04%
Union City	California	803	1.14%	4,659	6.64%
Fremont	California	799	0.35%	4,635	2.01%
Stockton	California	794	0.25%	4,606	1.44%
Manteca	California	681	0.82%	3,951	4.73%
Elk Grove	California	602	0.34%	3,492	1.98%
Carteret	New Jersey	530	2.09%	3,075	12.14%
Tracy	California	479	0.52%	2,779	2.99%
Los Angeles	California	444	0.01%	2,576	0.07%
Livingston	California	417	2.94%	2,419	17.07%
Turlock	California	379	0.52%	2,199	3.02%
Greenwood	Indiana	370	0.58%	2,147	3.36%
Hicksville	(New York (state)) New York	363	0.83%	2,106	4.8%
Hayward	California	343	0.21%	1,990	1.22%
Ceres	California	321	0.65%	1,862	3.78%
Clovis	California	310	0.26%	1,798	1.5%
Vineyard	California	289	0.66%	1,677	3.82%
Antelope	California	286	0.59%	1,659	3.4%
Lathrop	California	283	0.99%	1,642	5.72%
Indianapolis (balance)	Indiana	264	0.03%	1,532	0.17%
Fairfield	California	251	0.21%	1,456	1.21%
Roseville	California	233	0.16%	1,352	0.91%
Kerman	California	229	1.43%	1,329	8.3%
Modesto	California	206	0.09%	1,195	0.55%
Santa Clara	California	205	0.16%	1,189	0.93%
Auburn	(Washington (state)) Washington	198	0.23%	1,149	1.32%
Milpitas	California	167	0.21%	969	1.21%
Mountain House	California	165	0.67%	957	3.91%
Newark	California	155	0.33%	899	1.89%
Fowler	California	152	2.27%	882	13.16%
Phoenix	Arizona	149	0.01%	864	0.05%
Dublin	California	148	0.2%	859	1.18%
San Diego	California	144	0.01%	835	0.06%
Fontana	California	143	0.07%	830	0.4%
Renton	(Washington (state)) Washington	142	0.13%	824	0.77%
Rocklin	California	136	0.19%	789	1.1%
San Ramon	California	135	0.16%	783	0.93%
Selma	California	131	0.53%	760	3.08%
Folsom	California	126	0.16%	731	0.91%
Live Oak	California	124	1.36%	719	7.9%
Jersey City	New Jersey	119	0.04%	690	0.24%
Hercules	California	115	0.44%	667	2.56%
SeaTac	(Washington (state)) Washington	115	0.37%	667	2.12%
Total	United States	48,321	0.01%	280,329	0.08%

== Notable Sikh Americans ==
=== 1900s ===
- Kartar Kaur Dhillon, political activist and supporter of the Ghadar Party
- Bhagat Singh Thind, first turbaned soldier in United States Army; plaintiff in United States v. Bhagat Singh Thind, involving an important legal battle over the rights of Indians to obtain U.S. citizenship
- Dalip Singh Saund, First Asian Pacific American member of Congress and politician serving in the United States House of Representatives for California's 29th district, 1957–1963
- J.J. Singh, Punjabi-American businessman and political activist
- Spoony Singh, Canadian-American Founder of the Hollywood Wax Museum
- Narinder Singh Kapany, Indian-American Physicist and Sikh art Collector

=== 2000s ===
==== Academics ====
- Naunihal Singh, American political scientist and professor of national security affairs.
- Arjun Singh Sethi, Civil rights writer, political rights writer, human rights lawyer, and adjuct professor of law

==== Activism ====
- Jasmeet Bains, author of California State AJR2 1984 Sikh Genocide Resolution
- Valarie Kaur, American activist, documentary filmmaker, lawyer, educator, and founder of the Revolutionary Love Project.
- Simran Jeet Singh, American educator, writer, activist and executive director for the Aspen Institute's Religion & Society Program

==== Business ====
- Ajay Banga, Indian-American business executive and president of the World Bank Group. (1981-present)
- Gurbaksh Chahal, Internet Entrepreneur (1998-present)
- Sant Singh Chatwal, Indian-American hotelier and businessperson (1975-present)
- Vikram Chatwal, American hotelier and actor (2006-present)

==== Entertainment ====
- Hari Dhillon, American actor (1997-present)
- Ryan Hurst, American actor (1997-present)
- Arj Barker, American comedian (1990s-present)
- Snatam Kaur, American singer, songwriter and author (2000-present)
- Parvesh Cheena, American actor (2002-present)
- Waris Ahluwalia, Indian-American actor and tastemaker (2004-present)
- Guru Singh, American actor (2010-present)
- Karan Brar, American actor (2010-present)
- Dhar Mann, American YouTuber and entrepreneur (2011-present)
- Raaginder, American violinist and songwriter (2011-present)
- Raveena Aurora, American singer and songwriter (2012-present)

==== Law Enforcement ====
- Sandeep Dhaliwal, First turbaned Sikh man to serve on duty as Sheriff's deputy in Harris County, Texas.

==== Military ====
- G. B. Singh, Indian-American author and officer in the United States Army

==== Politics ====
- Jasmeet Bains, American Physician who is the first Sikh American and first South Asian Woman elected to the, California State Assembly
- Ranjeev Puri, Michigan House of Representatives
- Satwinder Kaur, Kent WA City Council
- Kim Singh, Mason OH city council
- Manpreet Kaur, Bakersfield City Council
- Sukh Kaur, San Antonio City Council
- Harpreet Singh Sandhu, American politician and community activist from Richmond, California (2007–2008)
- Harmeet Dhillon, American lawyer and Republican Party Official (2008-present)
- Kash Gill, Mayor of Yuba City, California (2009-2010) and (2013-2014)
- Preet Bharara, Indian-born American lawyer and former federal prosecutor who served as the United States Attorney for the Southern District of New York (2009-2017)
- Manka Dhingra, American attorney, Democratic politician who is represents the Party 45th legislative district, on Seattle's Eastside in King County (2017-present) and the first Sikh state senator of Washington
- Preet Didbal, Mayor of Yuba City, California (2017-2018)
- Balvir Singh, American teacher and Democratic politician from Burlington Township, New Jersey, serving on the Burlington County Board of County Commissioners (2018-present)
- Gurbir Grewal, American attorney and prosecutor, served the sixty-first attorney general of the State of New Jersey (2018-2021) and serving as the Director of the Division of Enforcement for the Securities and Exchange Commission (2021-present)
- Ravinder Bhalla, American civil rights lawyer, politician, and the 39th mayor of Hoboken, New Jersey (2018-present)
- Daleep Singh, American economic advisor serving as the Assistant Secretary of the Treasury for Financial Markets (2016-2017) and United States Deputy National Security Advisor for International Economics (2021-2022)
- Uttam Dhillon, American attorney, serving as the Acting Administrator of the Drug Enforcement Administration (2018-2020)
- Sabrina Singh, American political administrator serving as the Special Assistant to the President and Deputy Press Secretary for Vice President Kamala Harris in the Biden administration (2021-2022) and the Deputy Pentagon Press Secretary in the Department of Defense (2022-present)
- Mani Grewal, Utah, Sikh Activist, served Utah State Boards including Multicultural Commission, Workforce Services and Investment Board, helped Governor draft Sikh Proclamation, celebrated Vaisakhi at the Utah Capitol Building and design a Sikh Float in the 24th July Parade of the Pioneers.

==== Religious Services ====
- Thaminder Singh Anand, Indian-American translator of Guru Granth Sahib.
- Harbhajan Singh, Indian-American Sikh, founder of the 3HO Sikh tradition

== See also ==
- Indian American
- Indians in the New York City metropolitan region
- List of gurdwaras in the United States
- Murder of Balbir Singh Sodhi
- Sikhism by country
- Sikhism in Australia
- Sikhism in Canada
- Sikhism in New Zealand
- Sikhism in the United Kingdom
- Wisconsin Sikh temple shooting
