= Jagjit Singh (disambiguation) =

Jagjit Singh (1941–2011) was an Indian ghazal singer, composer and musician.

Jagjit Singh may also refer to:

- Jagjit Singh (activist) (1897–1976), Indian activist and entrepreneur
- Jagjit Singh (cricketer) (born 1997), Indian cricketer
- Jagjit Singh (field hockey) (1944–2010), Indian field hockey player
- Jagjit Singh (politician) (1934–2015), Indian politician
- Jagjit Singh (rower) (born 1966), Indian rower
- Jagjit Singh (writer) (1912–2002), Indian writer
- Jagjit Singh Anand (1921–2015), Indian communist activist, journalist, author
- Jagjit Singh Aurora (1916–2005), Indian general
- Jagjit Singh Chet (born 1961), Malaysian field hockey player
- Jagjit Singh Chohan (c. 1929 – 2007), founder of the Khalistan movement
- Jagjit Singh Chopra (1935–2019), Indian neurologist, medical writer, Emeritus Professor
- Jagjit Singh Dardi, Indian journalist
- Jagjit Singh Lyallpuri (1917–2013), Indian politician
- Jagjit Singh Taunque, Deputy Lieutenant of the West Midlands
- Pavandeep Singh Jagjit Singh (born 1998), Malaysian cricketer
- Satguru Jagjit Singh (died 2012), supreme spiritual head of Namdhari Sikhs from 1959 to 2012
- Tiger Jeet Singh (born 1944), Indian-Canadian wrestler

== See also ==
- Ajit Singh (disambiguation)
- Jagatjit Singh, last ruling Maharaja of Kapurthala from 1877–1947
- Jagjeet Singh, Indian Air Force officer
- Jai Singh (disambiguation)
- Jit Singh (born 1937), Indian wrestler
