= Vaishno Das Bagai =

Indian American business owner and activist

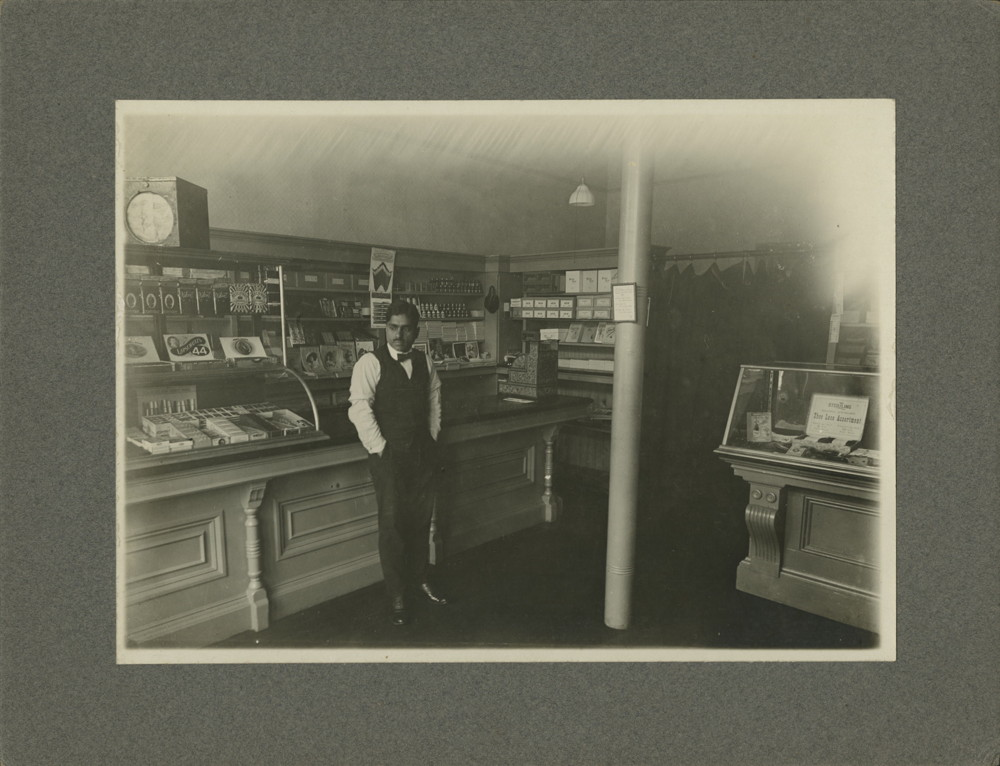
- Born: 1891; Peshawar, Punjab Province, British India (present-day Punjab, Pakistan)
- Died: March 16, 1928 (aged 36–37); San Jose, California, United States
- Cause of death: suicide
- Citizenship: British India, United States, stateless
- Spouse: Kala Bagai
- Children: 3

Vaishno Das Bagai (1891–1928) was an Indian American business owner and activist. His suicide, prompted by racism and denaturalization, is often cited as a poignant example of the human impact of United States v. Bhagat Singh Thind and racist policies facing South Asian immigrants.

== Early life in India ==
Vaishno Das Bagai was born in 1891 in Peshawar, British India (now Pakistan), into a wealthy family.

His father Shankar Das Bagai died in 1913, and he and his brother went on to inherit his family property. Vaishno married Kala Bagai, and they had three sons, Brij, Madan, and Ram.

As a young man, Vaishno developed strong sympathies for the Indian independence movement. According to Kala, his commitment extended to his personal life, including a rejection of imported British goods like English cloth and white sugar, in favor of indigenous alternatives like khadi and brown sugar—a practice he maintained even in the face of familial pressure to conform. Wrote Kala, "One time V.D.'s uncle took him to a small town to hide him against his will…those days were not considered good to go to the jails."

While in Peshawar, he got involved with the Ghadar Party, an organization that had emerged among Indian expatriates and revolutionaries seeking to mobilize resistance against British rule. According to his son Ram, Vaishno intimidated British officials, and was being tracked as a potential revolutionary by the Criminal Investigation Department. This would eventually precipitate his departure from India.

Wrote Ram Bagai, "He received an invitation from Pandit Ram Chandra of the Gadar Party in San Francisco to go there and work together for India's freedom from San Francisco." However, this claim by Ram Bagai is unsubstantiated, and British intelligence sources make it clear that Vaishno Das Bagai was willingly recruited by the British while still in India.

== Immigration and life in the United States ==
In 1915, Vaishno, Kala, and their children migrated from India to San Francisco, hoping to work with the Ghadar Party. Upon arrival, the Bagais spent a few days in detention at Angel Island. They were questioned about why they immigrated, but officials became less suspicious after seeing that the Bagais had brought all their savings with them.

Vaishno Das Bagai settled his family in the San Francisco Bay Area. He briefly opened India Arts and Curios, a store in Downtown Berkeley.

Despite his efforts to assimilate, including adopting Western clothing, the Bagais faced racial discrimination. In her 1982 oral history interview, Kala Bagai described how she and her husband attempted to move from San Francisco to Berkeley, California, where racist neighbors prevented them from entering their newly purchased home. Writes historian Erika Lee, "The family achieved a dream when they bought their first home in the city of Berkeley. But when they pulled up to their new neighborhood on moving day, they found that the neighbors had locked up the house to prevent them from moving in. 'All of our luggage and everything was loaded on the trucks,' recounted Kala Bagai. 'I told Mr. Bagai I don’t want to live in this neighborhood. I don’t want to live in this house, because they might hurt my children, and I don’t want it. He agreed. We paid for the house and they locked the doors? No!'"

The Bagais made their lives in San Francisco, where over the years, Vaishno ran several stores. One was an import store called "Bagai's Bazaar," which sold things like curios and handmade goods from India, embroideries from China, and other goods from Asia. He also ran a general store that sold items like candy, trinkets, soap, and supplies; the Bagais lived in an apartment right above.

Vaishno Das Bagai remained active in the Ghadar Party, taking on multiple roles. His activism would have serious consequences for the rest of his life, limiting his ability to return to India for fear of arrest by the British. According to Ram Bagai, Vaishno acted as a high-value double agent during World War I, feeding misinformation to British intelligence while turning over any payments to the Ghadar Party; the British would come to believe he was a valuable source. According to Ram Bagai, and supposedly based on his 1962 interview with Gobind Behari Lal, this led to controversy, with Ram Chandra accusing Bagai of being a British spy, while supporters like Gobind Behari Lal and Bhagwan Singh Gyanee maintained that Bagai's double agent role was widely known, and that Chandra himself had assigned Bagai the task and orchestrated the ruse. However, this account is at odds with other accounts and evidence, which confirms that Bagai was a British agent, having been vetted and given advance payment by them before he left India. The dispute preceded a serious schism in the Ghadar Party, dividing Chandra from those who accused him of embezzling party funds.

== The struggle for citizenship ==
=== Gaining citizenship, 1920–1921 ===
Two weeks after arriving in the United States, Vaishno Das Bagai formally declared his intention to become a U.S. citizen. In 1920, he filed his naturalization papers, providing caste certifications from officials in Peshawar that identified him as a "high caste Hindoo of Aryan origin". These documents were intended to satisfy the racially restrictive naturalization laws of the time, which required applicants to be classified as "white". Bagai successfully became a naturalized U.S. citizen in 1921.

=== The Thind decision, and United States vs. Vaishno Das Bagai, 1923–1925 ===
In 1923, following the Supreme Court's decision in United States v. Bhagat Singh Thind, Bagai and other South Asian Americans would lose their U.S. citizenship, as the court ruled they were not "white" and therefore ineligible for naturalization.

In 1924, the U.S. government filed a case titled United States of America vs. Vaishno Das Bagai. The government claimed that Bagai had "illegally obtained and procured naturalization" because he had represented himself as a “white person, whereas in fact and in truth he was a Hindu and not a white person."

Writes Erika Lee, "Referring to the Thind decision that decreed that 'a Hindu was not a white person' within the meaning of the U.S. law, the bill of complaint charged that Bagai 'then and there at the time well knew' that he was illegally obtaining naturalization. The absurdity of the charge that Bagai had illegally represented himself as white years before the Thind decision had been handed down did not seem to matter to the U.S. government."

=== Denaturalization, and its impacts, 1925–1928 ===
On March 11, 1925, the U.S. Attorney submitted an order to revoke and cancel Vaishno Das Bagai's naturalized citizenship. By early May, the Bureau of Naturalization officially declared that Vaishno Das Bagai was no longer recognized as a citizen.

==== Losing the right to own property or operate a business ====
Losing his citizenship had devastating consequences. Under California's Alien Land Law of 1913, he could no longer legally own property or operate his business. The family was forced to sell their property, including their store.

According to Rani Bagai, "he now could not own a business. So I believe it had to be transferred to a friend or someone who was not Indian…It was bad enough trying to run it on his own, and the discrimination and the bias, but now having to run it through a second party... the trust you put into someone to manage the money, and give you the money that's owed to you…there were…issues there where he was swindled or lost money and he felt, I think, quite a bit of despair and frustration towards the end.... He couldn't make a go of things the way he dreamed of in San Francisco…So it was a very…depressing, frustrating time for him."

==== Becoming a stateless person ====
This loss of citizenship also rendered Bagai stateless, preventing him from obtaining a U.S. passport or returning to British India without risking arrest due to his anti-colonial activism.

Write Lee and Yung, "The final insult came when the U.S. government refused to grant him a U.S. passport to visit friends and relatives in India in 1928. They suggested that he reapply for a British passport, but having once renounced his British citizenship in the name of Indian nationalism, Bagai refused to reclassify himself as a British subject."

According to Rani Bagai, "...now he could not travel to India unless it was back under an Indian passport under the crown, the British Crown…No matter what he did…he can't go home to India. They would pursue him, they would probably arrest him if he came back there because of the work he did with the Ghadar party in San Francisco."

== Suicide, and final letter ==
Vaishno Das Bagai was deeply affected by the stress of losing his citizenship, his business, and his sense of belonging.

He tried to commit suicide in San Francisco in February 1928, but was thwarted.

On March 16, 1928, he died of suicide by gas in a rented room in San Jose, leaving a note that criticized both himself and the American government for his disenfranchisement.

Vaishno Das Bagai's suicide note, published in the San Francisco Examiner, highlighted the profound personal toll of systemic racism and exclusion. It reads, in part:

I have a good home, fine health, good family, nice and lovely wife, extra good children, few but best friends and a paying business. I came to America thinking, dreaming and hoping to make this land my home. Sold my properties and brought more than twenty-five thousand dollars gold to this country, established myself and tried my very best to give my children the best American education.

In the year 1921 the Federal court at San Francisco accepted me as a naturalized citizen of the United States and issued to my name the final certificate, giving therein the name and description of my wife and three sons. In last 12 or 13 years we all made ourselves as much Americanized as possible.

But who is responsible? But they now come to me and say, I am no longer an American citizen. They will not permit me to buy my home and lo, they even shall not issue me a passport to go back to India. Now what am I? What have I made of myself and my children? We cannot exercise our rights, we cannot leave this country. Humility and insults, who is responsible for all this? Myself and American government.

I do not choose to live the life of an interned person: yes, I am in a free country and can move about where and when I wish inside the country. Is life worth living in a gilded cage? Obstacles this way, blockades that way, and the bridges burnt behind.

Yes, you can call me a coward in one respect, that I did not try to break the mountain with my naked head and fists.

Vaishno was survived by his wife Kala, and their three sons. Before his death, he provided detailed instructions to his wife about the multiple life insurance policies he had taken out on himself, the names of bankers to trust, and where to invest the money. One was for as much as $40,000. This helped her send her sons to college, and build a new life for herself. Since such life insurance policies have suicide exclusion clauses, they must have been purchased two or more years before the suicide, suggesting some planning on Bagai's part, rather than just despair. In her oral interview recorded in 1982, Kala Bagai refers to suspicions about her husband's espionage for the British in the context of his despondency and suicide, so this may have been a factor.

== Legacy ==
Vaishno Das Bagai's story has been widely cited by American historians and legal scholars as a powerful example of the human impact of racist policies impacting South Asians and other immigrants. Many specifically reference his suicide note, in which he described life in the United States as "living in a gilded cage."

The city of Berkeley, California renamed a downtown street "Kala Bagai Way" in 2021, recognizing Kala's resilience and community-building work after Vaishno's death, as well as the Bagai family's experience of housing exclusion from the city.

== See also ==
- Racial classification of Indian Americans
