= Uday Singh Taunque =

American soldier (1982–2003)

Sergeant Uday Singh
- Born: 23 April 1982; Jaipur, Rajasthan, India
- Died: 1 December 2003 (aged 21); Habbaniyah, Iraq
- Military career
- Allegiance: United States
- Branch: United States Army
- Service years: 2000–2003
- Rank: Sergeant
- Unit: 34th Armor Regiment
- Conflicts: Iraq War
- Awards: Bronze Star, Purple Heart

Sergeant Uday Singh was the first U.S. Army soldier of Indian descent to die during Operation Iraqi Freedom. His death in Iraq was widely reported in Indian and American media.

== Early life ==
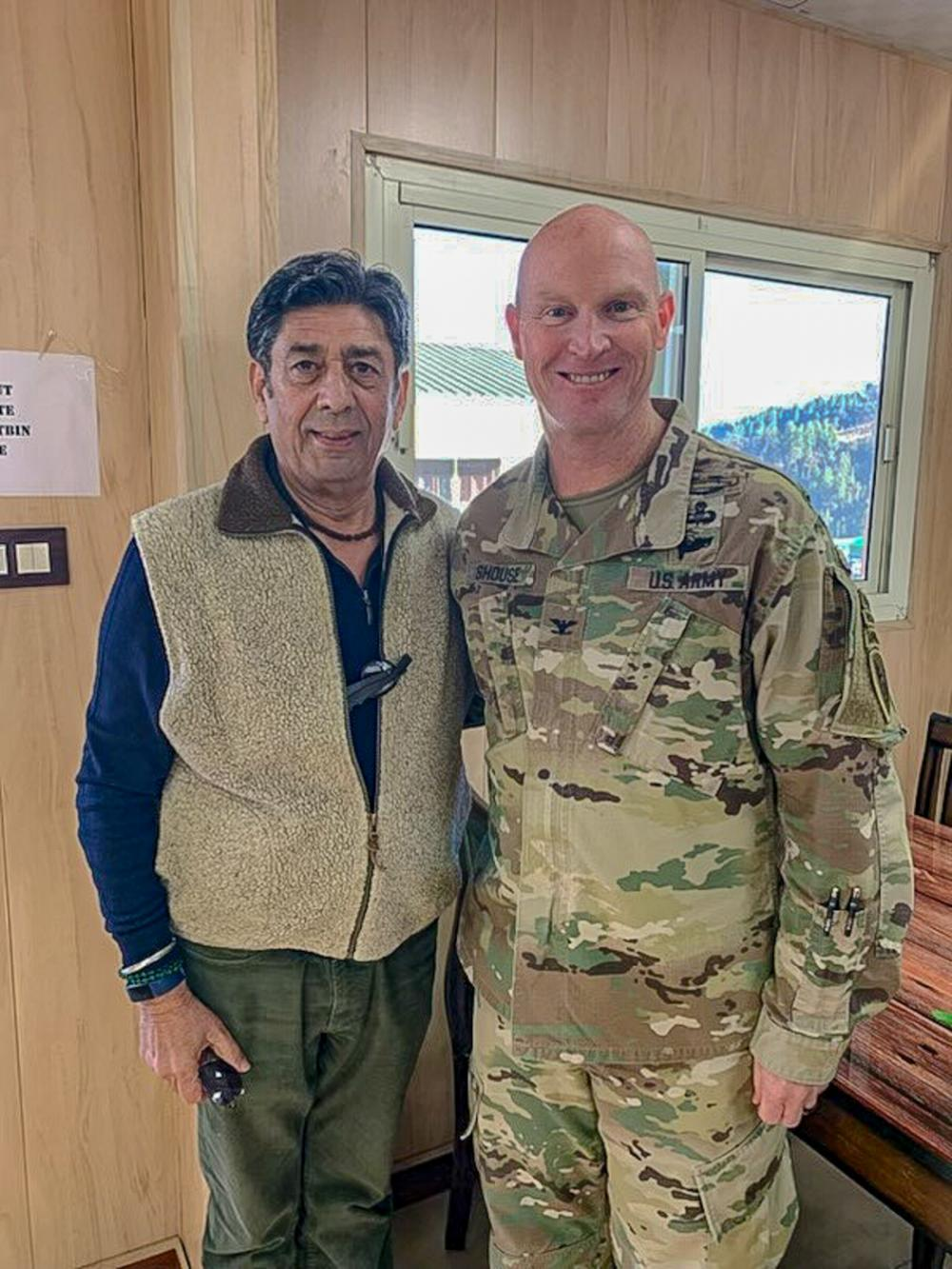
Lt. Col. Preet Mahinder Singh with Col. Jody Shouse, of the 11th Airborne Division, during Exercise Yudh Abhyas 2022 in Auli, Uttarakhand.

Sergeant Uday Singh was born in India on 23 April 1982. He was born to a distinguished military family. His father is Lt. Col. Preet Mahinder Singh, an Indian Army veteran who was part of the Armoured Corps. His grandfather, Wing Commander Kartar Singh Taunque, was the first member of Indian Air Force to win a gallantry award for operations in Waziristan during Waziristan campaign (1936–39). He lived with his parents at various military stations until 1994. In 1994, he moved to his grandparents' home in Chandigarh.

=== Education ===
In Chandigarh, he enrolled in St. Stephen's School, Chandigarh. English was his favourite subject. In 1995, Singh's parents and sister also moved to Chandigarh. Singh, completing school in Chandigarh in June 2000, left for the U.S. with his father and sister.

== Service in the U.S. Army ==
Singh enlisted in the U.S. Army on 28 August 2000 and following completion of initial training at Fort Knox was assigned to Charlie Company, 1st Battalion, 34th Armor Regiment, based at Fort Riley, Kansas.

Singh's unit was deployed to Iraq in September 2003. On, 1 December 2003, Singh was serving as the gunner in the lead Humvee of his platoon while on reconnaissance mission in Habbaniyah. The platoon took fire and Singh returned fire, pinning the insurgents down until reinforcements arrived. Sergeant Singh was shot in the head, just below his helmet, during the engagement and died while en route to the hospital. The mission led to the capture of a number of insurgents and large cache of weapons.

For his actions that day Uday received the Bronze Star and Purple Heart.

He was buried in Arlington National Cemetery, making him one of the only Sikhs to be buried there.

== Memorials ==
- Illinois General Assembly also paid homage to him by passing a Senate resolution.
- Uday Singh memorial at St. Stephen's School Chandigarh.

== See also ==
- Kartar Singh Taunque
- Jagjit Singh Taunque
- Indian American
- Punjabi American
- List of Indian Americans
