= Kala Bagai =

American activist

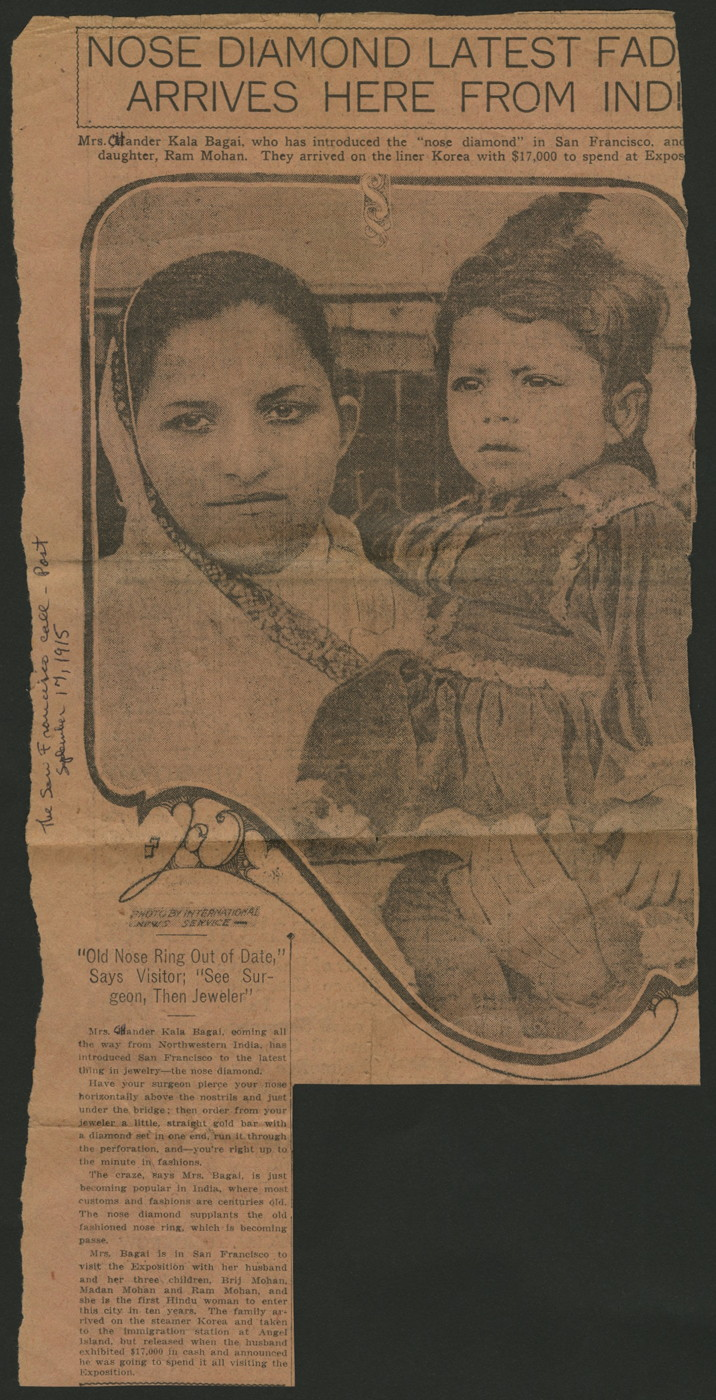
- 1915 arrival in San Francisco, as reported by newspapers
- Born: April 15, 1893; Amritsar, Punjab Province, British India (present-day Punjab, India)
- Died: October 4, 1983 (aged 90); Los Angeles, California, United States
- Citizenship: United States
- Known for: Immigrant activism
- Spouses: Vaishno Das Bagai; Mahesh Chandra

Kala Bagai (later Kala Bagai Chandra; 1893-1983) was a South Asian American immigrant and community activist. The Smithsonian described her as "a life-long advocate for immigrants and a mother figure among South Asian communities in California."

== Early life in India ==
Kala was born into a Punjabi Sikh family in Amritsar in British India on April 15, 1893, the daughter of Narain Singh and Kani Dhingra.

She married Vaishno Das Bagai and moved to Peshawar to live with him. They had three sons, Brij, Madan, and Ram.

Vaishno Das Bagai was involved with the anti-colonial Ghadar Party. After the death of his parents, he hoped to move to the United States with his family to join other Ghadar activists, leaving what he described as an enslaved country.

== Immigration ==
When Kala Bagai was 22, she, Vaishno, and their sons moved to the United States, arriving in San Francisco in September 1915.

Upon arrival, the Bagais spent a few days in detention at Angel Island. They were questioned about why they immigrated, but officials became less suspicious after seeing that the Bagais had brought all their savings with them.

Kala Bagai was one of very few South Asian women in the United States, and her family was among the few able to immigrate together to the United States.

== Life in Northern California ==
In San Francisco, according to granddaughter Rani Bagai, "She delighted in seeing a city newly rebuilt from earthquake ruins, touring the marvels of the Panama-Pacific Exposition, and walking on a sandy beach, things she’d never experienced in India."

Kala Bagai's arrival in San Francisco was noted in newspapers like the San Francisco Call-Post and the Washington Post, which remarked on her nose ring.

Vaishno Das Bagai had learned English in school in India, but Kala had yet to learn the language. She learned English after arrival, with the support of a German family who helped look after her children, giving her time to study. She also found ways to support the Indian independence movement.

Wrote Rani Bagai, "And from then on, they were kind of pioneers, because there really were very few Indians there around to help them, or to help them…acclimate…[Vaishno Das Bagai] dressed in a Western style with suits. My grandmother still wore a sari, though. She was very traditional, and she didn't eat meat, so that was kind of hard for her to adjust to, because, you know, so meat-centric, their diet then…But she managed…eating fruits and vegetables, and got by, and so they embarked on this adventure in San Francisco."

In her 1982 oral history interview, Kala Bagai described how she and her husband attempted to move from San Francisco to Berkeley, California, where racist neighbors prevented them from entering their newly purchased home.

Wrote historian Erika Lee:

"The family achieved a dream when they bought their first home in the city of Berkeley. But when they pulled up to their new neighborhood on moving day, they found that the neighbors had locked up the house to prevent them from moving in. 'All of our luggage and everything was loaded on the trucks,' recounted Kala Bagai. 'I told Mr. Bagai I don’t want to live in this neighborhood. I don’t want to live in this house, because they might hurt my children, and I don’t want it. He agreed. We paid for the house and they locked the doors? No!'"

They made their lives in San Francisco, where over the years, Vaishno ran several stores. One was an import store called "Bagai's Bazaar," which sold things like curios and handmade goods from India, embroideries from China, and other goods from Asia. Another was a general store that sold items like candy, trinkets, soap, and supplies; the Bagais lived in an apartment right above.

== The battle for citizenship ==
Vaishno Das Bagai became a naturalized United States citizen in 1921, but his citizenship was revoked in the wake of the 1923 Bhagat Singh Thind decision. This forced the family to sell their property, including their store, and left them stateless people unable to get a U.S. passport.

According to Rani Bagai, "that meant that now he could not travel to India unless it was back under an Indian passport under the crown, the British Crown…But there were a lot worse implications…he now could not own a business. So I believe it had to be transferred to a friend or someone who was not Indian. So there were a lot of problems then with that. It was bad enough trying to run it on his own, and the discrimination and the bias, but now having to run it through a second party and, you know, the trust you put into someone to manage the money and give you the money that's owed to you…there were…issues there where he was swindled or lost money and he felt, I think, quite a bit of despair and frustration towards the end. No matter what he did…he can't go home to India. They would pursue him; they would probably arrest him if he came back there because of the work he did with the Ghadar party in San Francisco. He couldn't make a go of things the way he dreamed of in San Francisco, for his family and, you know, the idea of a business and all that were kind of vanishing. So it was a very…depressing, frustrating time for him."

Vaishno Das Bagai committed suicide in 1928. In his suicide note, he wrote "I do not choose to live the life of an interned person: yes, I am in a free country and can move about where and when I wish inside the country. Is life worth living in a gilded cage? Obstacles this way, blockades that way, and the bridges burnt behind."

After becoming a widow, Kala Bagai raised her three children in the United States without holding citizenship. She managed the family’s finances, received support from friends and acquaintances, and was able to send all three of her sons to college, including Stanford, UC Berkeley, and USC.

She finally received her United States citizenship in 1950, after the passage of the Luce-Celler Act of 1946.

== Building community in Southern California ==
Kala Bagai remarried in 1934, to Mahesh Chandra, another Ghadar activist and an old family friend. She made the choice despite cultural taboos around widow remarriage, informing relatives back in India only after her sons were settled.

Kala and Mahesh moved to Southern California in the late 1940s, where she built a new life for herself. Granddaughter Rani Bagai described those years: "She flouted her cultural norms by marrying again, to another Indian activist and a graduate of UC Berkeley, Mahesh Chandra. She reinvented herself, attending night school, wearing Western dresses, and even learning tennis. She had many close American friends and never went on a social visit without a gift box of See’s candy."

By the 1950s, Kala Bagai had become an activist and community-builder in the early Indian and Pakistani immigrant community. She organized with other South Asian immigrant and American women, planned arts events, raised funds for post-Partition refugees, welcomed newcomers to her home, and built connections.

According to Rani Bagai:

"it seemed to be my grandmother’s personal mission to create a welcoming community to other immigrants arriving in this land, where she herself was once a stranger, and to show the kind of generosity of spirit to them that had been denied to her and her family. Working with both American and South Asian immigrant women like herself, she went on in the 1950s and 1960s to become an active community builder in Southern California, hosting Indian American cultural events, receptions, and benefits at community halls, theaters, and homes. She built bridges wherever she could between her adopted American culture and the great diversity of Indian culture."

Wrote historian Arko Dasgupta,

"Kala, an observant Sikh woman who was not even five feet tall, made and retained friends from all social and religious backgrounds. South Asian students from the University of California, Los Angeles (UCLA) could often be found at her house. She was famed for her hospitality and, despite being vegetarian herself, cooked meat for guests. The United States and her American friends no doubt made an impression on Kala as well. She began playing tennis, developed a taste for Mexican food, and came to enjoy the American holiday of Thanksgiving."

South Asian immigrant community members would sometimes refer to her as "Jhaiji," a term of endearment.

Kala Bagai died in Los Angeles on October 4, 1983, at age 90. An India-West obituary described her in her final years: "Mrs. Chandra radiated warmth, kindness, and good will to everyone. Her home became a 'little India' to the community, and she became the symbol of "Mother India."

== Legacy ==
Kala Bagai's photos, letters, and oral history audio are archived by the South Asian American Digital Archive.

Her story became a subject of increasing interest to Asian American and other historians after her death, in articles, books, and an academic symposium. She was also the subject of feminist and children's literature, and a t-shirt.

Dasgupta reflected on her story and legacy:

"While the overwhelming majority of early South Asian immigrants were men, it is crucial to not ignore the experiences of women…She was financially secure at a time when most immigrants from British India tended to come from straitened circumstances…[and yet faced] her fair share of tragedy: her first husband, Vaishno Das Bagai, committed suicide and two of her sons, Brij and Madan, predeceased her…Kala Bagai overcame personal grief and racial discrimination to create for herself a life of dignity and joy. Moreover, in providing service to others in her community and beyond, she also demonstrated how one could lead a full life."

=== Kala Bagai Way in Berkeley, California ===
The city of Berkeley, California named a downtown street after Kala Bagai in 2021, as part of the reconfiguration of Shattuck Avenue. The two block stretch known formerly as "Shattuck Avenue East" was renamed "Kala Bagai Way" after a year of community activism in support, in recognition of both her activism and her racist exclusion from the city a century earlier. It was the first street in the city named after an Asian American.

== See also ==
- Racial classification of Indian Americans
- Kartar Dhillon
- Anandi Gopal Joshi
- Pandita Ramabai
