= Kartar Dhillon =

American activist (1915–2008)

Kartar Kaur Dhillon
- Born: April 30, 1915; Simi Valley, California
- Died: June 15, 2008 (aged 94); Berkeley, California
- Other names: Kar
- Occupation: Activist
- Spouse: Suraj Singh Gill (married 1932-1942)
- Parents: Bakshish Singh Dhillon; Rattan Kaur

Kartar Kaur Dhillon (April 30 1915 – June 15 2008) was a Punjabi Sikh American political activist and writer from California. Dhillon grew up in the Ghadar Party, which worked to end British colonialism in India. As an activist, she supported unions, the Black Panther Party, farm workers, and political prisoners.

== Early life ==
Kartar Dhillon's father, Bakshish Singh Dhillon was one of the first Punjabi Sikh pioneers to arrive in the United States in 1897, with her mother, Rattan Kaur joining him in 1910.

She was the fourth child out of the total eight in the family. At the time she was born, their family was the only South Asian family in Simi Valley.

From 1916 to 1922, she and her family lived in Astoria, Oregon, where she and her siblings attended school and her father worked at a lumber mill. He was active in labor activism, once working to gain Indian American support for an International Workers of the World strike.

The family moved to California in 1922. Dhillon recalled that at the time, there were only three Sikh families in the state.

Dhillon attended thirteen different schools, primarily because of her father's ongoing search for work in the wake of the Alien Land Laws.

Her father died in about 1927, and her mother in 1932, leaving her to help raise younger siblings.

She graduated high school the same year, in 1932.

== Adult life ==
In 1932, in the face of family pressure to have an arranged marriage, Kartar Dhillon secretly married Surat Singh Gill, a member of the Ghadar Party, and a student at UC Berkeley. She would hide the marriage from her family until she was visibly pregnant.

Dhillon and Gill would go on to have two daughters, in addition to a son from Gill's first marriage. She would get divorced in 1942, raising her three children as a single mother working as a secretary in San Francisco. She would later write, “Freedom from marriage at the age of 27 with no job skills and three children to support is not quite the stuff of dreams, but I had finally taken my destiny into my own hands.”

During World War II, she worked as a machinist and truck driver from the Marine Corps. Her youngest brother, Hari, also volunteered for the Marine Corps and was killed in action in Okinawa in 1945 at the age of 18.

Over the course of her career, Dhillon picked crops, worked as a waitress, a movie extra, and the secretary for a wide variety of institutions, including the San Francisco Community Music School, Teamsters and Asbestos Worker's union, and an architect's office.

Kartar Dhillon retired in 1983.

She died on June 15, 2008, in Berkeley, California. She was survived by two children, nine grandchildren, and seven great-grandchildren.

== Political activism ==
While Dhillon was born into a family associated with the Ghadar Party, much of her work was focused on the United States. Over the course of her life, she would support issues like affirmative action, the Black Panther Party, freeing political prisoners like Geronimo Pratt, supporting prisoners on death row, labor unions, farm workers organizing for a union in California's Central Valley, and the Korean reunification movement. A long-time member of the Office and Professional Employees International Union, she joined the picket line when the union went on strike.

Dhillon's daughter Ayesha Gill said, "What was great about Kartar was not only her political activism and her strength of belief in fighting for working people and for justice for them, but on a very human level, she was so compassionate…It wasn't a cerebral thing, it was an automatic human response."

== Writing and art ==
According to a KQED profile, "She studied art and literature to fulfill her own personal passions, and shorthand and bookkeeping to support her family. She scraped together money to take her kids to museums, lectures, plays and operas. She found donated tickets for symphony performances. She sent the children for music lessons, taught them how to play chess and rented bicycles with them in Golden Gate Park."

Her writing included "The Parrot's Beak," a widely-cited autobiographical essay about her early life published in Making Waves: An Anthology of Writings By and About Asian American Women.

She also wrote for People's World, a socialist newspaper.

In 1994, at age 80, Dhillon was a co-founding member of the Chaat Collective, a South Asian American art and performance group.

== In popular culture ==
- The film Turbans, about a Sikh family in Astoria, Oregon in 1918, is based on Dhillon's memoirs and is directed by her granddaughter, Erika Surat Andersen.
- Kartar Dhillon and Kala Bagai are the subjects of the South Asian Women's History Mural in Berkeley, California, designed by artist Sabina Kariat and ARTogether.

== See also ==
- Yuri Kochiyama
