= Fauja Singh Keeps Going =

2020 children's book by Simran Jeet Singh

- Author: Simran Jeet Singh
- Language: English
- Subject: Children's literature
- Published: Penguin Random House
- Publication date: 2020
- Media type: Book
- ISBN: 978-0525555094
- OCLC: 1129729058

Fauja Singh Keeps Going is a 2020 children's book that tells the story of Sikh centenarian Fauja Singh, who in 2011 claimed to be the oldest person to have completed a marathon. The book is written by Simran Jeet Singh and has illustrations by Baljinder Kaur and foreword written by Fauja Singh.
