= Sabrina Singh =

American administrator (born 1988)

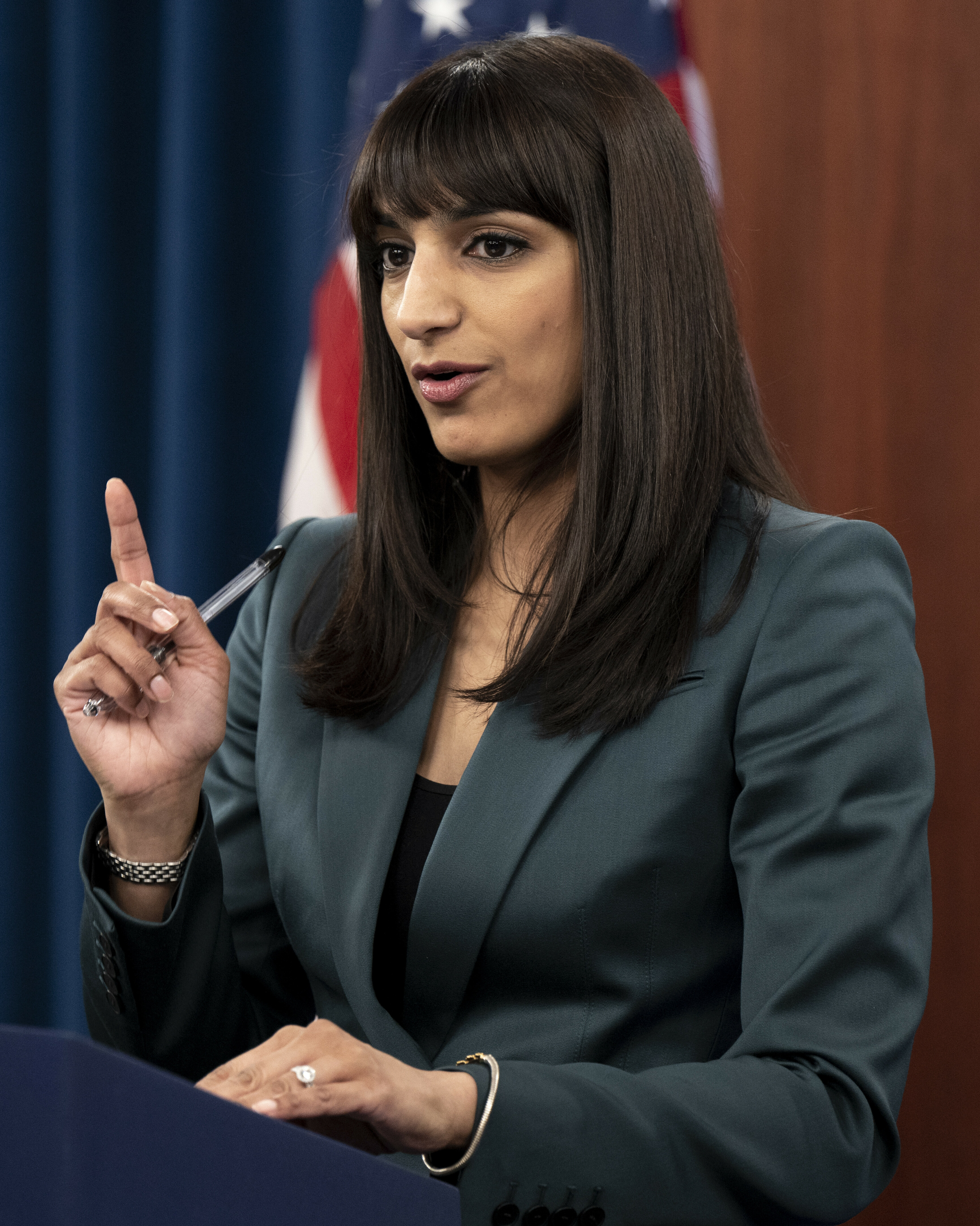
- Singh in 2023

Deputy Pentagon Press Secretary
- In office April 2022 – January 20, 2025
- Secretary: Lloyd Austin
- Leader: John Kirby; Patrick S. Ryder
- Preceded by: Jamal Brown
- Succeeded by: Kingsley Wilson

Deputy Press Secretary for the Vice President
- In office January 20, 2021 – March 31, 2022
- Vice President: Kamala Harris
- Preceded by: Samantha Schwab
- Succeeded by: Ernesto Apreza

Personal details
- Born: 1988 (age 37–38) Los Angeles, California, U.S.
- Party: Democratic
- Spouse: Mike Smith
- Education: University of Southern California (BA)

Sabrina Singh (born 1988) is an American administrator who served as the Deputy Pentagon Press Secretary in the United States Department of Defense from April 2022 to January 2025. Singh previously served as Special Assistant to the President and Deputy Press Secretary for Vice President Kamala Harris in the Biden administration from 2021 to 2022.

== Early life and education ==
Singh is a graduate of the Harvard-Westlake School, a private prep school located in Los Angeles, California. She is an alumna of the USC School of International Relations.

== Career ==
Singh started her career as the press assistant at the Democratic Congressional Campaign Committee. She served as the Press Secretary to Kamala Harris, the former Vice President of the United States, when Harris was California's senator. Earlier, Singh was appointed as a National Spokesperson for Michael Bloomberg 2020 presidential campaign. She has also served as the National Press Secretary for Cory Booker 2020 presidential campaign. She was the Communications Director in Hillary Clinton's 2016 presidential campaign. Singh has served as the Deputy Communications Director for the Democratic National Committee, and spokeswoman for American Bridge's Trump War Room.

Since her departure from the federal administration she has commented on military and economic policy on Fox News as part of their "All-Star" panel, and commented on the US military groupchat leak for multiple news outlets.

== Personal life ==
Sabrina Singh is of Sikh heritage. Her grandfather Jagjit Singh (aka J. J. Singh), the head of the India League of America, hailed from Abbottabad in the present day Pakistan. The family moved to the United States before the Partition of India. Her father Manjit was born in 1956 in New York City; when he was five years old, his parents returned to New Delhi with their entire family. Manjit and his brother Manmohan grew up in Delhi. Following the death of Jagjit Singh in 1976, Manjit and Sabrina's mother Srila, decided to immigrate to the United States again. Manjit was an executive with Sony Home Entertainment and chairman and CEO of Sony India.

She is married to Mike Smith, the political director for Nancy Pelosi, the former Speaker of the United States House of Representatives.
