= Sikh Coalition =

Sikh American advocacy organization

- Formation: 11 September 2001
- Website: https://www.sikhcoalition.org/

The Sikh Coalition is a Sikh-American non-profit advocacy group that defends Sikh civil rights founded in 2001 with offices in New York City, Washington, D.C., and Fremont, California.

The Sikh Coalition, was originally named the Coalition of Sikh Organizations of New York. Sikh-Americans were attacked as a "retribution attack" after 9/11, thus leading to the founding of the group, at a time when the American public "began to equate the turban and beard with the face of terror."

It actively engages in legal advocacy, working towards legislative reforms to safeguard Sikh civil rights. The organization offers legal support and assistance to individuals who have faced discrimination or hate crimes based on their Sikh identity.

== Background ==
The Sikh Coalition was formed on the night of September 11, 2001, by volunteers in reaction to a wave of aggressive attacks against Sikh Americans throughout the United States. It is now the largest Sikh Civil Rights organization. Its community-based group seeking to promote equal and human justice for all citizens.

According to a study conducted by the Sikh Coalition in 2014, a significant number of Sikh American children have experienced bullying and harassment in their school environment. Specifically, the study found that 54% of all Sikh American children have been subjected to bullying and harassment, while 67% of those who wear turbans have experienced similar mistreatment in schools.

== COVID-19 ==
The Sikh Coalition helped 500,000 Sikhs living in America understand the pandemic better.

== Youth ==
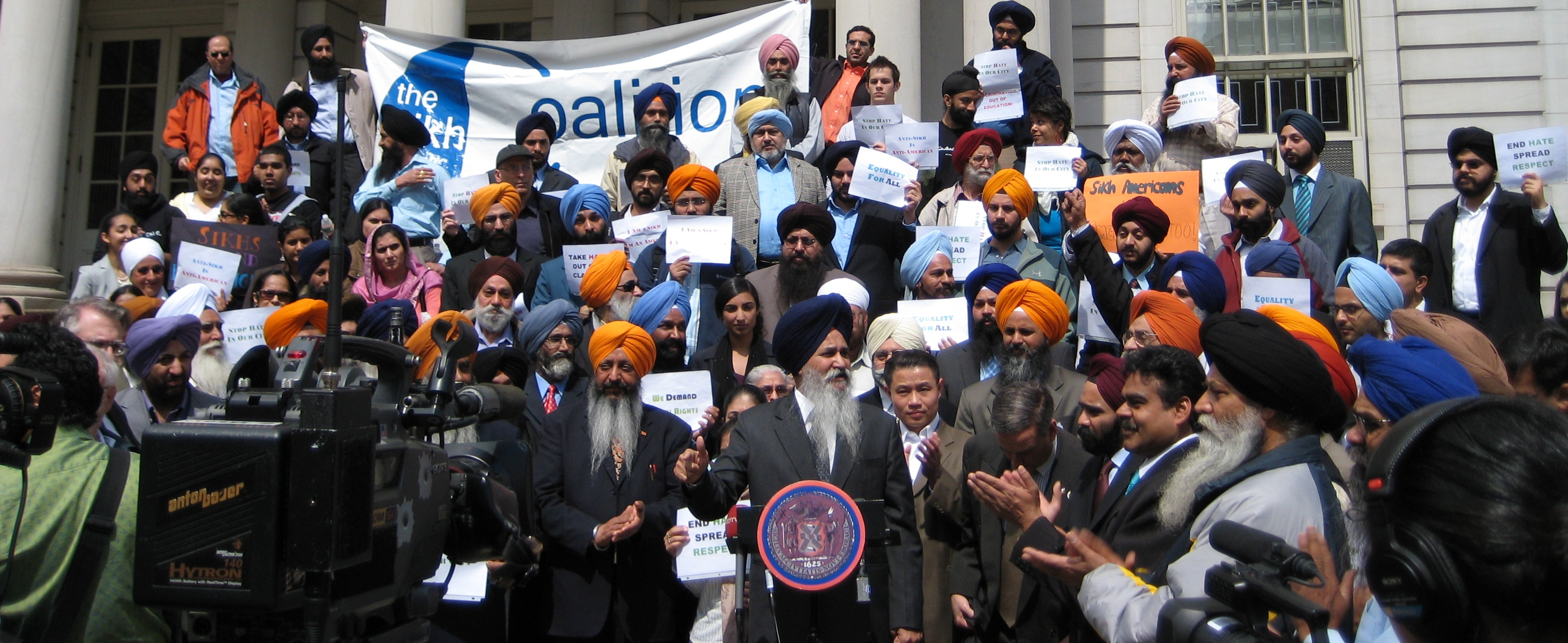
Demonstrators marching against bullying in schools in Richmond Hill, New York, on June 30, 2008

The Sikh Coalition established the Junior Sikh Coalition in August 2012 to empower the youth and to create a safe environment for them to practice Sikhism. It is a "student-led initiative designed to inspire Sikh youth, strengthen the communities to which they belong, and help them achieve their leadership potential". The program offers one-year leadership training to high school and college students. The program is currently on pause due to the worldwide COVID-19 pandemic.

== See also ==
- The New York Foundation
- Sikh American Legal Defense and Education Fund
- Sikhs for Justice
