= Jagjit Singh (activist) =

Indian activist in America

- Born: Jagjit Singh; October 5, 1897; Rawalpindi, British India (now in Pakistan)
- Died: 1976 (aged 78–79); United States
- Other name: J. J. Singh
- Occupation: activist
- Years active: 1926–1959
- Organization: India League of America
- Known for: lobbying for the Luce–Celler Act of 1946

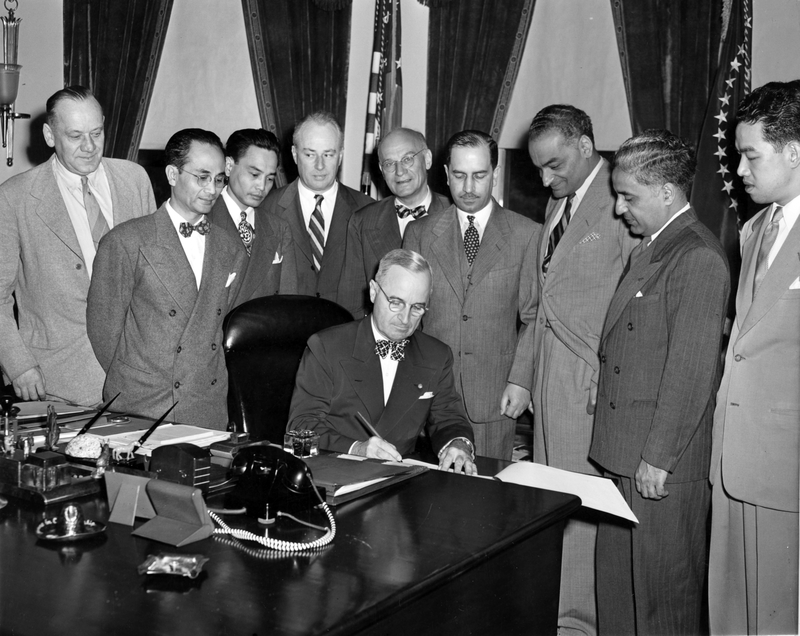
Singh, third from right, observing President Harry S. Truman signing the Luce-Celler Act of 1946.

Jagjit Singh, better known as J. J. Singh (October 5, 1897 – 1976), was an Indian-American activist and president of the India League of America.

== Biography ==
Singh was born in Rawalpindi, British India, on October 5, 1897.

From 1926 to 1959, he lived in the United States; he ran a successful textile import business in New York City and lobbied for the passage of the Luce–Celler Act of 1946, which permitted Indians to naturalize in the United States.

== Personal life ==
Singh married Malti Saksena, daughter of Ramji Saksena, a diplomat with Indian Consulate. His granddaughter Sabrina Singh has served as the Deputy Pentagon Press Secretary in the United States Department of Defense.
