= Jagjit Singh Taunque =

Deputy Lieutenant of the West Midlands

Dr Jagjit Singh Taunque MBE, DL (Hindi: जगजीत सिंह) is a retired Deputy Lieutenant of West Midlands. He has represented the Birmingham Inter Faiths Council on the University Court since 1995, becoming an Honorary Life Member of the Court in 1998. He is also Chairman of the Birmingham Valuation Tribunal and of the Punjab Culture Centre, Trustee of Birmingham Council of Faiths and Patron of Birmingham International Council.

He was appointed a Member of the Order of the British Empire (MBE) in June 2000.
