= Punjabi Americans =

Americans of Punjabi descent

Panjābī Amrīkī
- The language spread of Punjabi in the United States according to U.S. Census 2000

Total population
- 318,588; 0.1% of the total American population (2021)

Regions with significant populations
- California: 156,763 (0.42%)
- New York: 30,341 (0.16%)
- Washington: 19,292 (0.26%)
- New Jersey: 17,857 (0.2%)
- Texas: 15,538 (0.06%)

Languages
- English (American • Indian • Pakistani) • Punjabi; American Spanish • Hindi-Urdu

Religion
- Sikhism, Hinduism, Islam, Christianity, Unaffiliated

Related ethnic groups
- Indian Americans, Pakistani Americans, Punjabi Mexican Americans, Bengali Americans

Punjabi Population History in the United States
Year	Pop.	±%
1980	19,298	—
1990	50,005	+159.1%
2000	110,254	+120.5%
2010	243,773	+121.1%
2021	318,588	+30.7%
Source: United States Census Bureau

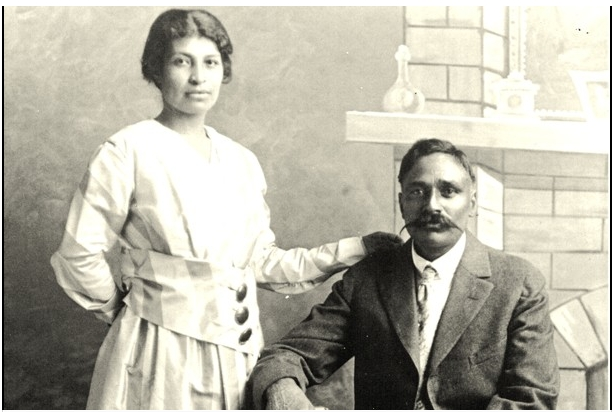
A Punjabi-Mexican American couple, Valentina Alarez (left) and Rullia Singh (seated), posing for their wedding photo in 1917.

Punjabi Americans are Americans who either have total or partial Punjabi ancestry, originating in the Punjab region of Pakistan and India. There are over 300,000 Punjabi Americans, many of whom first migrated from British Punjab and settled in California's Central Valley.

A notable community within Punjabi Americans is that of Punjabi Mexican Americans, found in California with both Punjabi and Mexican ancestry.

== Sikhs ==
Sikhs have been a part of the American populace for more than 130 years. At the turn of the 19th century, the province of Punjab of British India was hit hard by British practices of mercantilism. Many Sikhs emigrated to the United States and began arriving to work on farms in California. They traveled via Hong Kong to Angel Island, California, the western counterpart to Ellis Island in New York.

"Some Sikhs worked in lumber mills of Oregon or in railroad construction and for some Sikhs, it was on a railway line, which allowed other Sikhs who were working as migrant laborers to come into the town on festival days".

Due to discrimination from Anglo Americans, many early Punjabi immigrants in California married Mexican Americans, forming a sizable Punjabi Mexican American community. Punjabi farmers were also able to circumvent laws prohibiting their ownership of property by operating through American bankers.

== Ravidassias ==
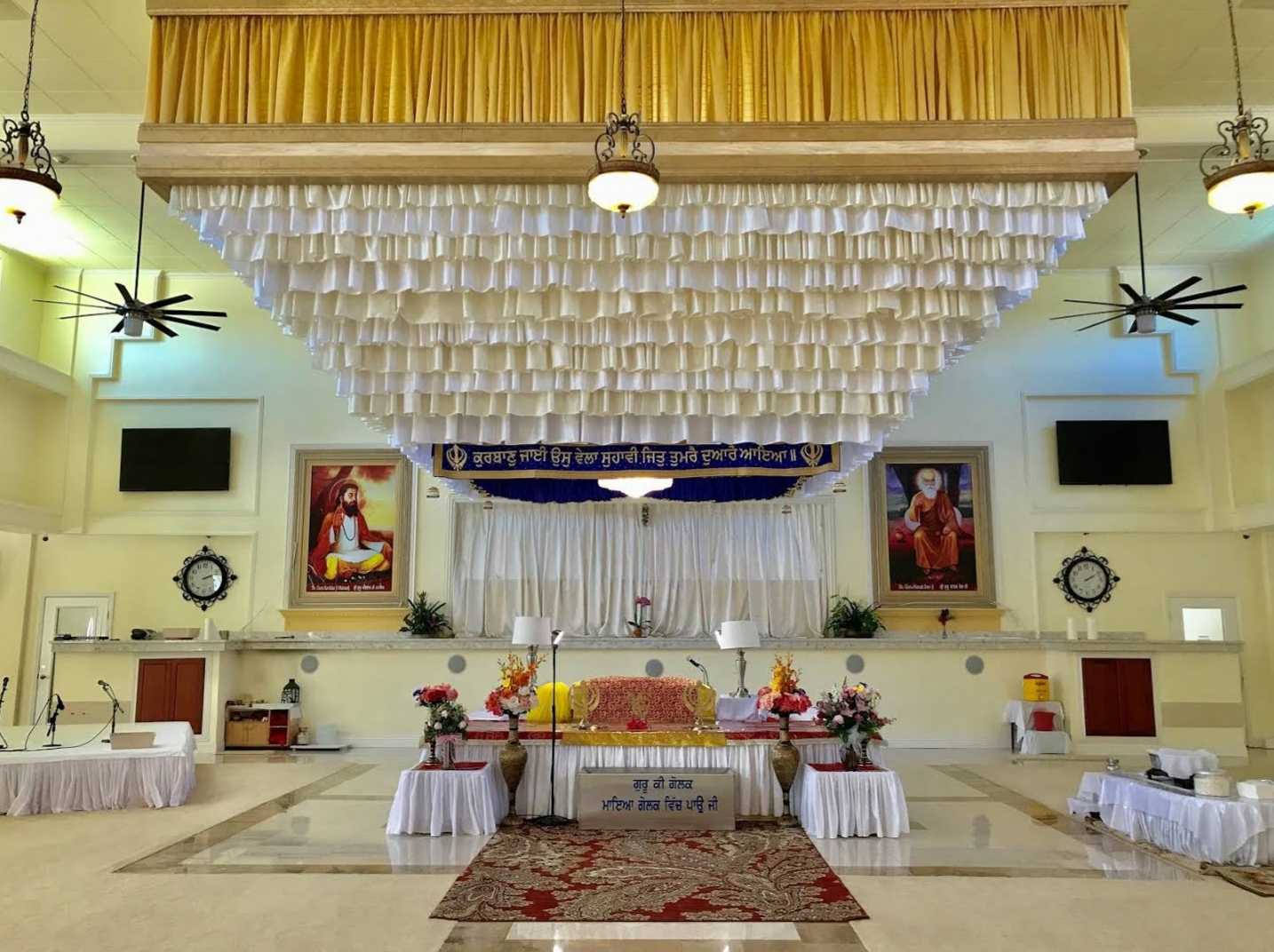
Gurdwara Guru Ravidass Temple, Pittsburg, California

There is a notable population of Ravidassias in the United States, with the majority of them living in California. It is estimated that there are about 20,000 members of the Ravidassia community in California’s Central Valley - a vast majority of them with roots in Punjab in northwestern India. The background of the Ravidassia community in California is from Sikhs, Hindus, and Indigenous peoples. Ravidassia community has six Guru Ravidass temples in California, which have an appearance of Sikh Gurdwaras with the sacred book Shri Guru Granth Sahib Ji placed at the center point of the main prayer hall.

== Role in America ==
Most Sikhs started life in America as farm labourers, with many eventually becoming landowners and successful farmers. In 1956, Dalip Singh Saund became the first Asian American to be elected to the United States House of Representatives. At present Amarjit Singh Buttar is perhaps the only turbaned Sikh who holds elected public office. He was elected in December 2001 to the Vernon, Connecticut Board of Education for a four-year term. He has also been recently selected as the chairman of the board. Bobby Jindal, the governor of Louisiana is also of Punjabi descent, as well as Nikki Haley, the former United States Ambassador to the United Nations and the 116th governor of South Carolina.

Many Punjabi Americans have become successful in technology-related fields. Vinod Dham helped to develop the Pentium processor while Vinod Khosla and Sabeer Bhatia co-founded Sun Microsystems and Hotmail respectively. Aneesh Chopra served as the first Chief Technology Officer (CTO) of the United States, appointed by President Barack Obama.

== Geographical distribution ==
=== States ===
Approximately half of all American Punjabis live in California.

Punjabi Americans by state and territory (1990 −2021)
State and territory	2017-21 (est.)		2006-10 (Est.)		2000		1990	
State and territory	Pop.	%	Pop.	%	Pop.	%	Pop.	%
California	142,450	0.38%	103,998	0.31%	67,820	0.22%	25,725	
(New York (state)) New York	36,435	0.19%	32,135	0.18%	22,560	0.13%	5,516	
(Washington (state)) Washington	18,410	0.26%	11,454	0.19%	6,005	0.11%	861	
New Jersey	17,225	0.2%	11,304	0.14%	7,730	0.1%	2,648	
Texas	9,795	0.04%	6,875	0.03%	3,765	0.02%	1,497	
Virginia	7,828	0.1%	8,177	0.11%	4,560	0.07%	1,283	
Michigan	7,612	0.08%	5,676	0.06%	3,635	0.04%	1,256	
Maryland	7,147	0.12%	3,224	0.06%	2,975	0.06%	1,699	
Indiana	6,691	0.11%	2,895	0.05%	740	0.01%	418	
Illinois	6,195	0.05%	4,276	0.04%	4,315	0.04%	2,180	
Pennsylvania	5,057	0.04%	3,944	0.03%	2,030	0.02%	769	
Ohio	5,011	0.05%	5,083	0.05%	2,040	0.02%	1,067	
Massachusetts	4,917	0.07%	2,588	0.04%	995	0.02%		
Arizona	3,833	0.06%	1,980	0.03%	1,035	0.02%		
North Carolina	3,642	0.04%	2,932	0.03%	705	0.01%	485	
Wisconsin	2,852	0.05%	1,936	0.04%	1,165	0.02%	318	
Florida	2,544	0.01%	2,126	0.01%	1,655	0.01%		
(Georgia (U.S. state)) Georgia	2,540	0.03%	1,882	0.02%	790	0.01%	317	
Nevada	2,190	0.08%	743	0.03%	715	0.04%		
Kansas	1,948	0.07%	827	0.03%	249	0.01%	240	
Missouri	1,670	0.03%	579	0.01%	500	0.01%	142	
Oregon	1,570	0.04%	1,246	0.04%	425	0.01%		
Connecticut	1,455	0.04%	1,269	0.04%	934	0.03%		
Utah	1,383	0.05%	632	0.03%	255	0.01%	86	
Colorado	1,121	0.02%	367	0.01%	360	0.01%		
Minnesota	1,153	0.02%	331	0.01%	459	0.01%		
Mississippi	858	0.03%	622	0.02%	275	0.01%	114	
South Carolina	676	0.01%	261	0.01%	199	0.01%	214	
Louisiana	612	0.01%	551	0.01%	474	0.01%	257	
Alabama	507	0.01%	451	0.01%	219	0.01%	249	
Iowa	481	0.02%	60	0%	125	0%		
Arkansas	478	0.02%	91	0%	80	0%	56	
Oklahoma	464	0.01%	53	0%	150	0%		
Tennessee	379	0.01%	572	0.01%	200	0%		
New Hampshire	359	0.03%	287	0.02%	85	0.01%	125	
Kentucky	317	0.01%	340	0.01%	160	0%		
Vermont	289	0.05%	120	0.02%	0	0%		
Delaware	214	0.02%	371	0.04%	169	0.02%		
New Mexico	207	0.01%	228	0.01%	130	0.01%		
(Washington, D.C.) District of Columbia	189	0.03%	138	0.03%	134	0.02%		
Nebraska	160	0.01%	70	0%	65	0%		
Idaho	92	0.01%	324	0.02%	0	0%	33	
Rhode Island	74	0.01%	0	0%	30	0%		
Hawaii	68	0%	0	0%	39	0%		
Alaska	33	0%	0	0%	25	0%		
North Dakota	23	0%	0	0%	35	0.01%	21	
Montana	12	0%	13	0%	0	0%		
Maine	5	0%	0	0%	0	0%	25	
South Dakota	0	0%	0	0%	0	0%		
West Virginia	0	0%	196	0.01%	219	0.01%	72	
Wyoming	0	0%	0	0%	0	0%		
Puerto Rico	0	0%	16	0%	0	0%		
United States	309,373	0.1%	223,309	0.08%	141,295	0.05%	47,673	

=== Metropolitan areas ===
15 largest Punjabi American Primary statistical area populations
Primary statistical area	2017-2021 American Community Survey		2012-2016 American Community Survey	
Primary statistical area	Pop.	%	Pop.	%
(California) San Jose-San Francisco-Oakland, CA CSA	62,574	0.69%	49,626	0.62%
(New York (state)) (New Jersey) (Connecticut) (Pennsylvania) New York-Newark, NY-NJ-CT-PA CSA	49,005	0.22%	49,728	0.22%
(California) Sacramento-Roseville, CA CSA	31,576	1.26%	30,195	1.28%
(California) Los Angeles-Long Beach, CA CSA	20,217	0.12%	18,858	0.11%
(California) Fresno-Madera-Hanford, CA CSA	16,559	1.36%	16,010	1.56%
(Washington (state)) Seattle-Tacoma, WA CSA	15,743	0.34%	11,825	0.28%
(Washington, D.C.) (Maryland) (Virginia) (West Virginia) (Pennsylvania) Washington-Baltimore-Arlington, DC-MD-VA-WV-PA CSA	13,054	0.14%	12,930	0.15%
(California) Bakersfield, CA MSA	6,610	0.79%	6,822	0.85%
(Pennsylvania) (New Jersey) (Delaware) (Maryland) Philadelphia-Reading-Camden, PA-NJ-DE-MD CSA	6,416	0.09%	5,125	0.08%
(Illinois) (Indiana) (Wisconsin) Chicago-Naperville, IL-IN-WI CSA	5,711	0.06%	5,606	0.06%
(Indiana) Indianapolis-Carmel-Muncie, IN CSA	5,493	0.24%	4,533	0.21%
(Michigan) Detroit-Warren-Ann Arbor, MI CSA	5,458	0.11%	4,548	0.09%
(Massachusetts) (Rhode Island) (New Hampshire) (Connecticut) Boston-Worcester-Providence, MA-RI-NH-CT CSA	5,144	0.06%	3,256	0.04%
(Texas) Dallas-Fort Worth, TX-OK CSA	4,273	0.06%	4,467	0.07%
(Texas) Houston-The Woodlands, TX CSA	4,135	0.06%	2,854	0.05%
United States	309,373	0.1%	280,867	0.09%

=== Communities ===
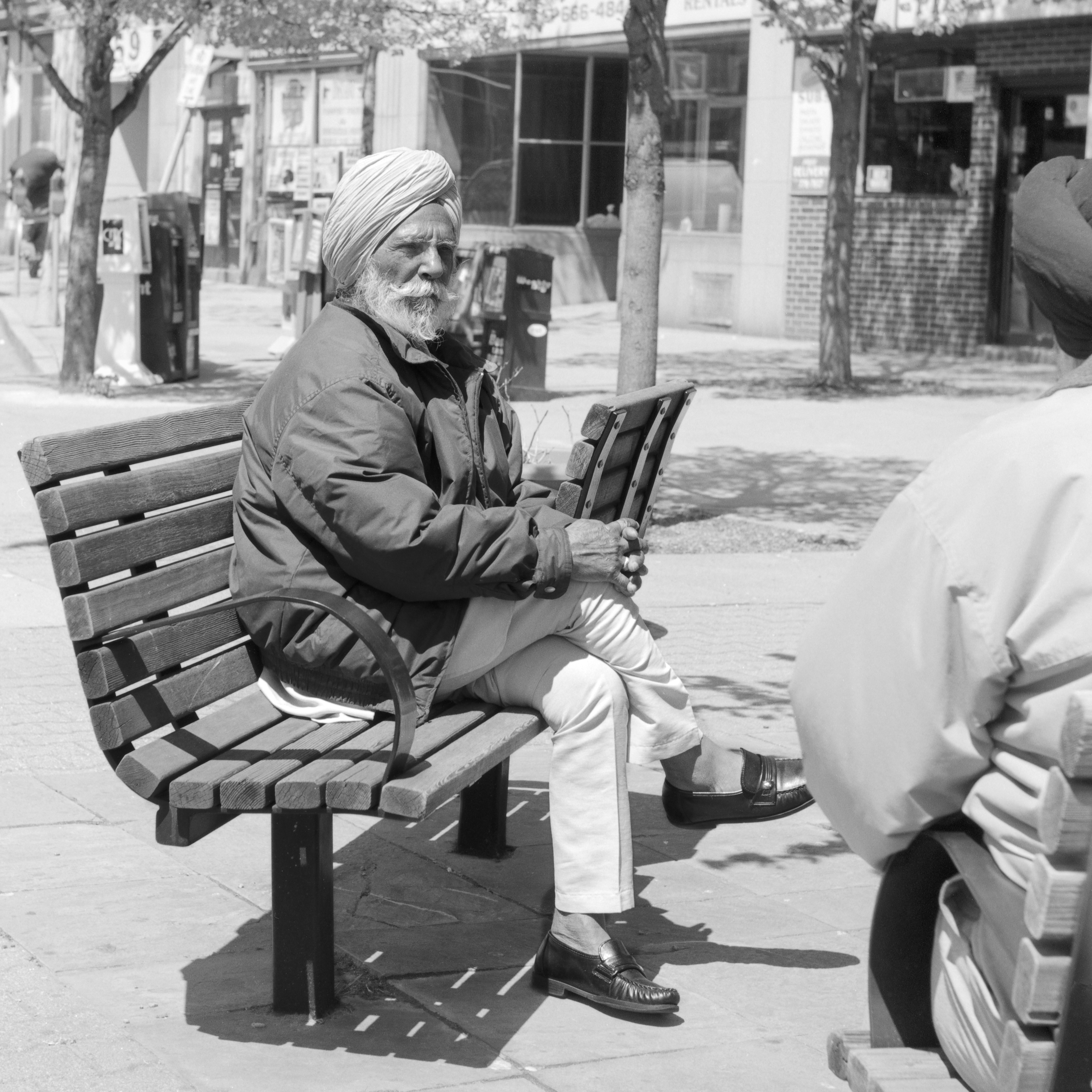
Members of the Sikh community of Union Square, Somerville, Massachusetts in 2004.

Nearly half of American Punjabis live in California. Most of California's Punjabi population live in NorCal, especially in the Central Valley and the Bay Area. The nation's largest Punjabi population is in California's Central Valley, where Punjabi is the third most spoken language after only English and Spanish. Punjabis can be found across the Sacramento and San Joaquin valleys, but the largest concentrations can be found in the valley's largest cities (Sacramento in the Sacramento Valley and Stockton, Fresno, and Bakersfield in the San Joaquin Valley), and in smaller communities associated with the farming of almonds, peaches, walnuts, and plums. There are also significant concentrations of Punjabi Americans in the Sacramento–San Joaquin River Delta and in the Bay Area near Fremont, California.

In the Sacramento Valley, Yuba City and Live Oak have prominent Punjabi populations, with the first Punjabi arriving in Yuba City in 1906. In 2021, Yuba City was home to an Indian American population of 10,638 (15.3% of the city's population), while Live Oak was home to an Indian American population of 1,038 (11.4% of the city's population), with most of these being Punjabis. Sutter County, California as a whole is home to 12,753 Indian Americans (12.9% of the county population); with most of these being Punjabis, this makes Sutter County the most proportionally Punjabi county in America. Down south in the San Joaquin Valley, Livingston is home to 2,798 Indian Americans (19.9% of the city's population); with most of these being Punjabi, Livingston is the most proportionally Punjabi municipality in America.

The New York metropolitan area also has a significant Punjabi American presence, with 49,005 Punjabis living in the area. 18,187 Punjabis live in New York City (0.23% of the city's population), including 16,139 in the borough of Queens (0.73% of the borough's population). The Richmond Hill neighborhood of Queens is often referred to as "Little Punjab" due to its large Punjabi population. In 2020, the stretch of 101st Avenue between 111th and 123rd streets in Richmond Hill was renamed Punjab Avenue (ਪੰਜਾਬ ਐਵੇਨਿਊ) and the stretch of 97th Avenue between Lefferts Boulevard and 117th Street was renamed Gurdwara Street. Outside of the city, the suburbs of Hicksville in Long Island and Carteret in Central Jersey have significant Punjabi populations. In 2021, Hicksville was home to 8,040 Indian Americans (18.7% of the community's population) while Carteret was home to 4,708 Indian Americans (18.8% of the borough's population), with many of these being Punjabis.

Outside of California and the New York metropolitan area, there are significant populations of Punjabi Americans in Kent, Washington (in the Seattle Metropolitan Area) and Greenwood, Indiana (in the Indianapolis Metropolitan Area).

20 largest Punjabi American Public Use Microdata Area populations
PUMA	2017-2021 American Community Survey	
PUMA	Pop.	%
Sutter & Yuba Counties--Yuba City PUMA, California	11,182	6.7%
San Joaquin County (South)--Tracy, Manteca & Lathrop Cities PUMA; California	9,432	4.17%
(New York (state)) NYC-Queens Community District 9--Richmond Hill & Woodhaven PUMA, New York	7,705	5.39%
Alameda County (Southwest)--Union City, Newark & Fremont (West) Cities PUMA; California	4,717	3.41%
Fresno County (North Central)--Fresno City (North) PUMA, California	4,686	2.57%
Kern County (Central)--Bakersfield City (West) PUMA, California	4,683	2.19%
(New York (state)) NYC-Queens Community District 13--Queens Village, Cambria Heights & Rosedale PUMA; New York	4,592	2.26%
Sacramento County (Northwest)--Sacramento City (Northwest/Natomas) PUMA, California	4,457	3.98%
(Washington (state)) King County (Southwest Central)--Kent City PUMA, Washington	4,236	3.35%
San Joaquin County (Central)--Stockton City (North) PUMA, California	3,927	2.2%
(New York (state)) NYC-Queens Community District 10--Howard Beach & Ozone Park PUMA, New York	3,877	2.88%
Middlesex County (Northeast)--Carteret Borough PUMA, New Jersey	3,615	3.38%
Alameda County (South Central)--Fremont City (East) PUMA, California	3,310	1.73%
Sacramento County (Central)--Elk Grove City PUMA, California	3,300	2.13%
Fresno County (Central)--Fresno City (Southwest) PUMA, California	3,260	1.98%
(New York (state)) Nassau County (East Central)--Oyster Bay Town (Central) PUMA, New York	3,202	3.19%
Fresno County (Central)--Fresno City (Southeast) PUMA, California	2,875	2.73%
Merced County (West & South)--Los Banos & Livingston Cities PUMA, California	2,771	2.6%
Sacramento County (South)--Galt, Isleton Cities & Delta Region PUMA; California	2,769	2.43%
Alameda County (East)--Livermore, Pleasanton & Dublin Cities PUMA; California	2,768	1.22%
United States	309,373	0.1%

== Notable Punjabi Americans ==
=== Activists ===
- Kala Bagai, immigration activist
- Bhagat Singh Thind, soldier and spiritualist. Fought for Indian-American citizenship rights in the US
- Khizr and Ghazala Khan, parents of US Army captain Humuyun Khan and anti-Islamophobia activists

=== Military ===
- Humayun Khan, US Army officer who was killed in the Iraq War
- Uday Singh, soldier of Indian descent who died in Operation Iraqi Freedom

=== Musicians ===
- Raaginder, violinist, music producer and songwriter
- Heems, rap artist and former member of alternative hip-hop group Das Racist
- Raveena Aurora, singer-songwriter
- Amar Sandhu, singer-songwriter

=== Politics ===
- Bobby Jindal, governor of Louisiana
- Nikki Haley, governor of South Carolina and former United States Ambassador to the United Nations
- Kashmir Gill, former mayor of Yuba City, California
- Ravinder "Ravi" Bhalla, mayor of Hoboken, New Jersey and first turban-wearing Sikh mayor of a U.S. city
- Dalip Singh Saund, first Asian American and first member of a non-Abrahamic faith elected to the House of Representatives
- Ro Khanna, U.S. Representative for California's 17th District
- Lahori Ram - First Indo-American to be appointed as the Economic Development Commissioner of California.
- Zohran Mamdani - mayor of New York City, of Punjabi descent through his mother's ancestry

=== Judiciary ===
- Satnam Rattu - Indian origin judge of the Superior Court of Sacramento County in California.
- Neetu Badhan Smith - First Sikh woman judge in the United States.

=== Sports ===
- Mike Mohamed, American football linebacker

== See also ==
- List of Indian Americans
- List of Pakistani Americans
- Bengali Americans
