= Katie Brennan (politician) =

American politician (born 1987)

- Katie Brennan speaking at a May Day rally in Jersey City.

Member of the New Jersey General Assembly from the 32nd district
- Incumbent
- Assumed office January 13, 2026 Serving with Ravinder Bhalla
- Preceded by: John Allen; Jessica Ramirez

Personal details
- Born: June 24, 1987 (age 39)
- Party: Democratic
- Other political affiliations: Democratic Socialists of America, Working Families Party
- Spouse: Travis Miles
- Education: Xavier University (BS); Rutgers University (MS)
- Website: Legislative webpage

Katie Brennan (born June 24, 1987) is an American politician, housing policy expert, and community activist. She currently serves as a member of the New Jersey General Assembly for the 32nd Legislative District, which includes Hoboken and most of Jersey City. Before running for office, she worked for state and local housing agencies in New Jersey and New York, including as chief of staff of the New Jersey Housing and Mortgage Finance Agency.

Brennan was first elected in 2025 alongside her running mate, Ravi Bhalla, after defeating establishment-backed candidates aligned with the Hudson County Democratic Organization and Jersey City Mayor Steven Fulop in the Democratic primary. The race was the first state-level primary after New Jersey abolished "county line" ballots, in what NJ.com and national political commentators described as a defeat of "machine politics."

Brennan is a member of the New Jersey Working Families Party, which named her one of its top two priority Assembly candidates in 2025. She is also a member of the Democratic Socialists of America and became one of the first two DSA members elected to the New Jersey Legislature with Chigozie Onyema of Newark.

She lives in the Journal Square neighborhood of Jersey City and is active with the Journal Square Community Association.

== District 32 ==
Each of the 40 districts in the New Jersey Legislature has one representative in the New Jersey Senate and two representatives in the New Jersey General Assembly. The representatives from the 32nd District for the 2026–2027 Legislative Session are:

- Senator Raj Mukherji (D)
- Assemblyman Ravinder Bhalla (D)
- Assemblywoman Katie Brennan (D)
