= Steve White (judge) =

US judge

Stephen W. White (born April 13, 1949 in Sacramento, California) is a Judge of the Sacramento County Superior Court. He served as Presiding Judge for 2010 and 2011. He was appointed to the bench in 2003 by Governor Gray Davis. Between 1999 and 2003, he served as the Inspector General of the California Department of Corrections and Rehabilitation, overseeing California's prison system, and from 2001 to 2003 also served as Special Counsel to the Governor. From 1995 to 1999 he was a partner in the law firm Kronick Moskovitz Tiedemann & Girard. He was the District Attorney of Sacramento County from 1989 to 1995. From 1983 to 1989 he was Chief Assistant Attorney General for California. From 1979 to 1983 he was Executive Director of the California District Attorneys Association. He was deputy and supervising deputy district attorney in Sacramento County from 1974 to 1979. He has been an adjunct professor at the University of California, Davis School of Law since 1996. He received his J.D. from the University of California, Davis School of Law in 1974.
