= Jessica Ramirez =

American politician (born 1975)

Member of the New Jersey General Assembly from the 32nd district
- In office January 9, 2024 – January 13, 2026 Serving with John Allen
- Preceded by: Angelica M. Jimenez; Pedro Mejia
- Succeeded by: Ravinder Bhalla; Katie Brennan

Personal details
- Born: October 20, 1975 (age 50) Cayey, Puerto Rico
- Party: Democratic
- Education: Stockton University (BA) 1998; Seton Hall University School of Law (JD) 2001
- Website: Legislative webpage

Jessica Ramirez is an American attorney, television personality, and Democratic Party politician who served as a member of the New Jersey General Assembly for the 32nd legislative district from 2024 to 2026.

== Biography ==
A partner at the law firm of D'Arcy Johnson Day and a resident of Jersey City, New Jersey, Ramirez moved from Cayey, Puerto Rico as a child, not speaking any English. She graduated from Stockton University and earned her Juris Doctor from the Seton Hall University School of Law

== Elective office ==
In the wake of the 2021 apportionment, the reconfiguration of municipalities in the 32nd and 33rd districts and the incumbent Assembly members in those districts choosing to retire or run for other elective office, the Hudson County Democratic Organization chose newcomers John Allen and Ramirez to run for the two Assembly seats. Ramirez and Allen defeated Republican Robert Ramos, the only other candidate running in the 2023 New Jersey General Assembly election. Ramirez was one of 27 members elected for the first time in 2023 to serve in the General Assembly, more than one-third of the seats.

Ramirez was defeated in her bid for a second term in June 2025 when she finished third in the Democratic primary for District 32 behind Ravi Bhalla and Katie Brennan, both of whom would go on to win the general election.

=== Committees ===
Committee assignments for the 2024—2025 Legislative Session are:

- Community Development and Women's Affairs
- Military and Veterans' Affairs

=== District 32 ===
Each of the 40 districts in the New Jersey Legislature has one representative in the New Jersey Senate and two representatives in the New Jersey General Assembly. The representatives from the 32nd District for the 2024—2025 Legislative Session are:

- Senator Raj Mukherji (D)
- Assemblyman John Allen (D)
- Assemblywoman Jessica Ramirez (D)

== Electoral history ==
32nd Legislative District General Election, 2023
Party	Candidate	Votes	%
Democratic	Jessica Ramirez	15,197	45.7
Democratic	John Allen	14,391	43.3
Republican	Robert Ramos	3,665	11.0
Total votes		33,253	100.0
Democratic hold			
Democratic hold			

== Television work ==
In addition to her work in the New Jersey General Assembly and in the legal profession, Ramirez has been a legal analyst for Fox News and Oxygen. Beginning in September 2026, Ramirez began serving as Adam Levy's law clerk on the televised courtroom show Adam's Law.
