= Lahori Ram =

Economic Development Commissioner Lahori Ram

California Commission for Economic Development
- In office 2007–2009

Personal details
- Born: May 10, 1944 Lalwan, Hoshiarpur, India
- Died: January 11, 2009 (aged 64)

Lahori Ram was the first Indo-American to be appointed to a statewide commission in California. He served as the Economic Development Commissioner of California.

== Early life ==
Ram was born in Ravidasia family in Lalwan, Punjab, India. He received his bachelor's degree in economics from Punjab and immigrated to the United States on a student visa in 1972 to pursue postgraduate studies in economics.

== Tribute in US House of Representatives ==
His social and philanthropic services to society were recognised by the US House of Representatives. Congressman Jackie Speier delivered the obituary speech and was remembered by all political representatives in the US House of Representatives.

== Socio-political life ==
Before serving as the Economic Development Commissioner of California, he also served on the state's Technology, Trade, and Commerce Committee and the Transportation Commission. He was co-founder of North America's first Sri Guru Ravidas Temple in Pittsburg, California in 1984.
