= Ravinder Bhalla =

American politician (born 1974)

Ravi Bhalla
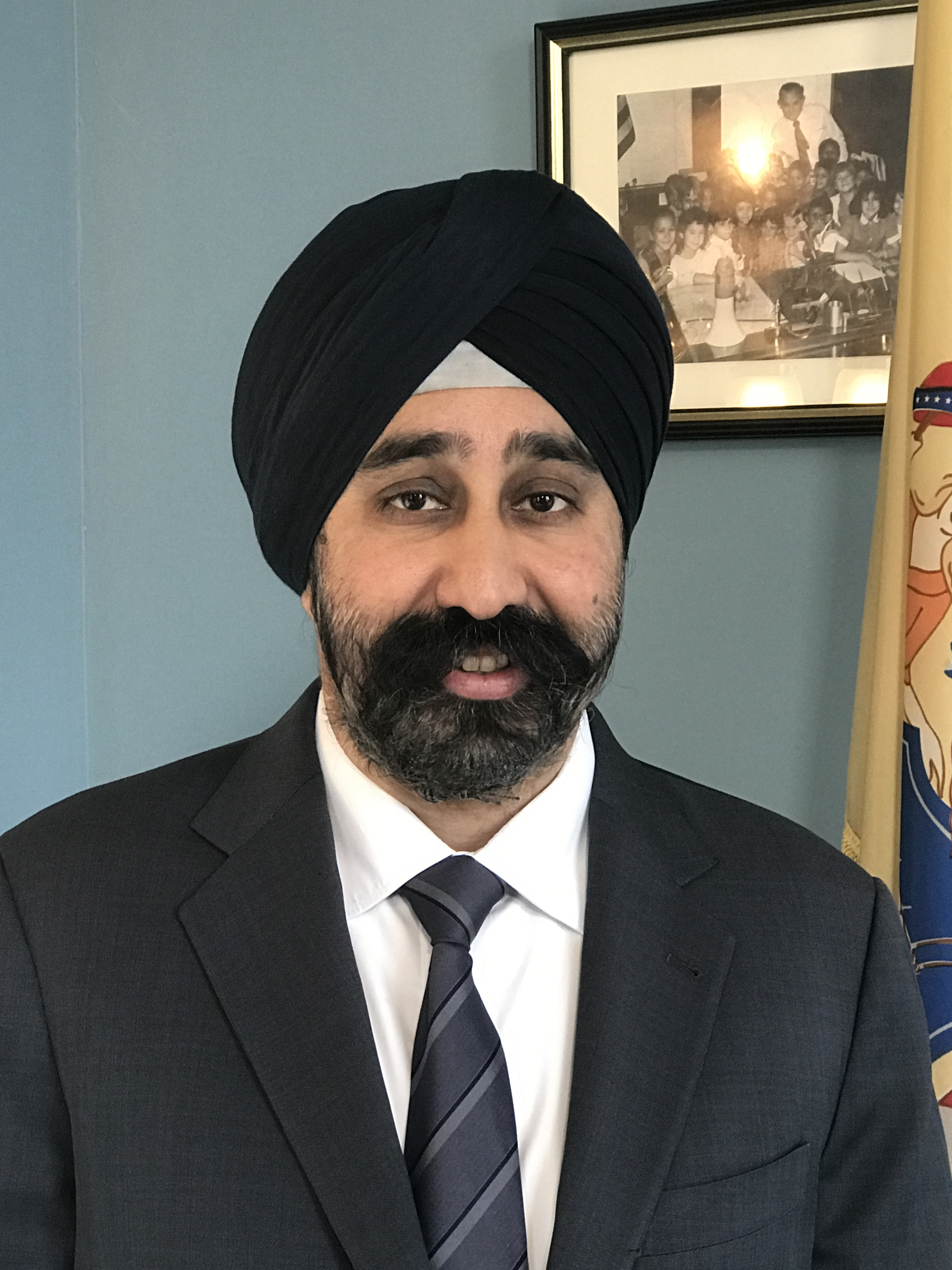
- Bhalla in 2017

Member of the New Jersey General Assembly from the 32nd district
- Incumbent
- Assumed office January 13, 2026 Serving with Katie Brennan
- Preceded by: John Allen; Jessica Ramirez

39th Mayor of Hoboken
- In office January 1, 2018 – January 13, 2026
- Preceded by: Dawn Zimmer
- Succeeded by: Emily Jabbour

Personal details
- Born: Ravinder Singh Bhalla; May 10, 1973 (age 53) Passaic, New Jersey, U.S.
- Party: Democratic
- Spouse: Navneet Patwalia
- Children: 2
- Education: University of California, Berkeley (BS); London School of Economics (MS); Tulane University (JD)
- Website: Legislative webpage

Ravinder Singh Bhalla (born May 10, 1973), often simply called Ravi Bhalla, is an American civil rights lawyer and politician, who served as the 39th Mayor of Hoboken, New Jersey, between 2018 and 2026, and represents the 32nd Legislative District in the New Jersey General Assembly.

Prior to becoming mayor, he served on the Hoboken City Council from 2009 to 2018. In 2017, he was elected as New Jersey's first Sikh mayor. (Note: Kash Gill was the first Sikh to be elected mayor in the United States when he was elected mayor of Yuba City, California, in 2009, but he did not wear a turban. Additionally, the Charlottesville City Council (Virginia) appointed councilmember Satyendra Huja, a Sikh who wears a turban, to the position of mayor in 2012.)

A Democrat, Bhalla was a candidate for New Jersey's 8th congressional district in the 2024 election. In the November 2025 general election, Bhalla was elected to represent the 32nd Legislative District in the New Jersey General Assembly.

== Early life ==
Ravinder Singh Bhalla was born in Passaic, New Jersey, and raised in Woodland Park (then called West Paterson.) His parents, Ranbir and Harminder Singh, live in Montville, New Jersey, where they own and manage a company that manufactures high-pressure sodium street lamps that Ranbir Singh, a physicist, invented himself.

Bhalla earned a Bachelor of Science degree in political psychology from the University of California, Berkeley, a master's degree in public administration and public policy from the London School of Economics, and a juris doctor from Tulane University Law School in New Orleans.

== Career ==
=== Legal practice ===
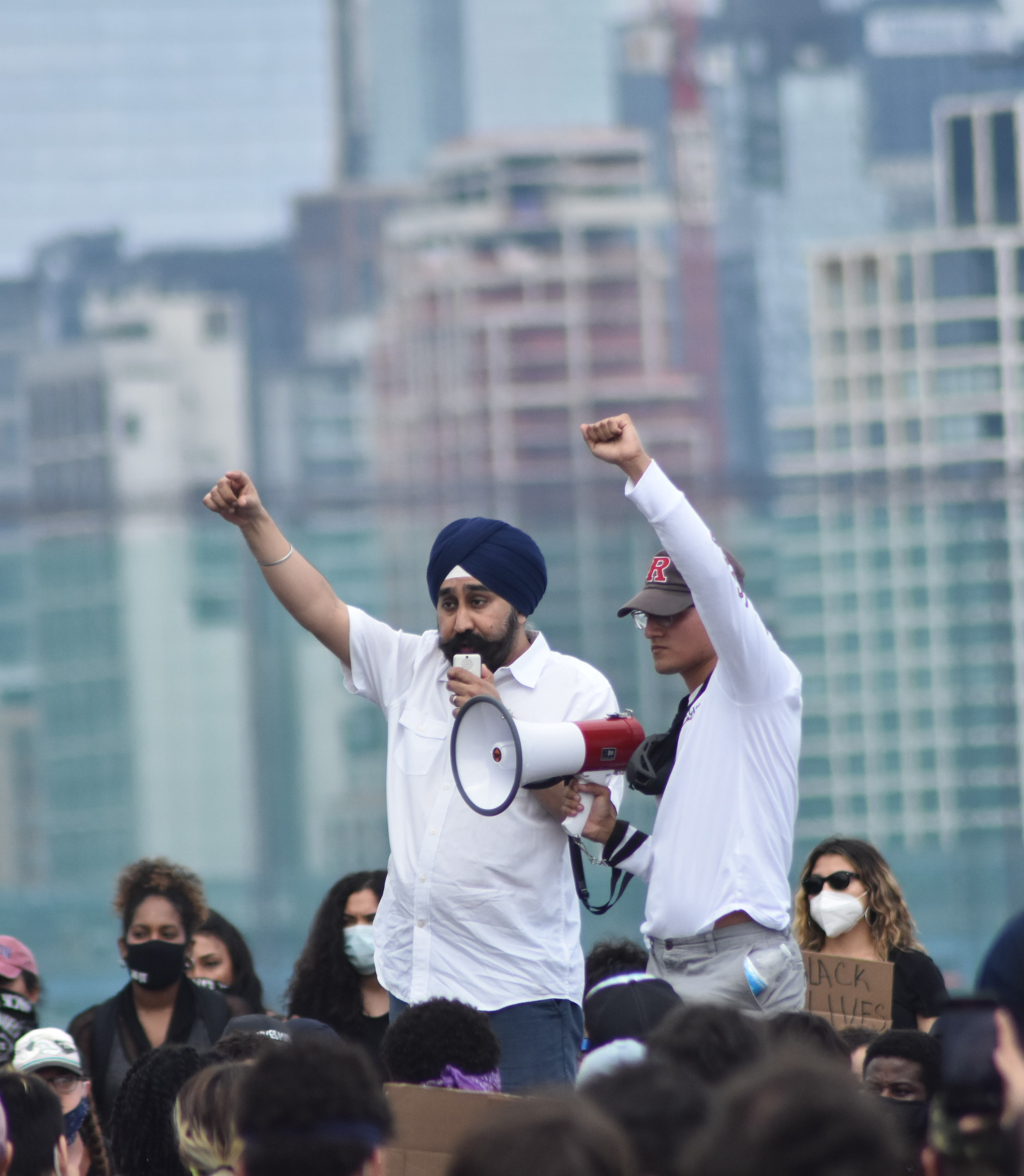
Bhalla during a George Floyd protest in Hoboken on June 5, 2020

Bhalla was a civil rights attorney at the law firm of Florio, Perrucci, Steinhardt & Fader, who have represented NJ Transit.

In a 2002 case, Bhalla represented three high school students at Hunterdon Central High School in Flemington, New Jersey. The high school had implemented a policy of random drug-testing of students participating in any extracurricular activities or who have a parking permit, and the three students filed a lawsuit in New Jersey State Court alleging the school's drug-testing policy violated their rights according to the New Jersey Constitution. The New Jersey state court ruled that the random drug-testing was allowable under the state constitution, pointing to a similar case ruling by a federal court. Bhalla said he disagreed with the state court's ruling, saying that the New Jersey Constitution gives a wider protection against unreasonable search and seizure than the United States Constitution.

In a case in 2003, Bhalla represented Amric Singh Rathour. Rathour had qualified for a job in traffic enforcement with the New York Police Department. Rathour's supervisors fired Rathour because he would not shave his beard or stop wearing his turban, both of which are required by Rathour's religion, Sikhism. On behalf of his client, Bhalla filed a lawsuit in United States District Court for religious discrimination.

Bhalla wrote an amicus curae for the federal court case of married couple Harpal Singh Cheema and Rajwinder Kaur. Cheema had been brutally and repeatedly tortured by Indian police for protesting the Indian government and for giving food and shelter to Khalistani separatist protesters in India. Cheema and Kaur had been allowed to enter the U.S. for humanitarian reasons. Their asylum application was later disapproved, and they were trying to fight that decision so they could remain in the U.S. Cheema lost his appeal and was deported to India, where he was arrested at Indira Gandhi International Airport, New Delhi.

In another case, Bhalla represented Gurpreet S. Kherha. A car dealership in Little Falls, New Jersey, refused to employ Kherha because of its policy of prohibiting beards. Kherha's religion, Sikhism, forbids him from shaving his beard. Bhalla filed a religious discrimination complaint with the Equal Employment Opportunity Commission and a lawsuit in New Jersey State Court, stating that the car dealership had violated Kherha's civil rights by refusing him reasonable religious accommodation. The Equal Employment Opportunity Commission determined that Kherha had indeed suffered religious discrimination, and the parties settled the case.

=== Politics ===
Bhalla ran for an at-large seat on the Hoboken City Council in 2009 on Mayoral candidate and then-Councilwoman Dawn Zimmer's ticket. During Bhalla's campaign, he emphasized fiscal responsibility, slowing down development, increasing the amount of affordable housing, lower city property taxes, and transparency in government. In the election, Bhalla received 13% of the vote, advancing to a runoff election. In the runoff election, Bhalla received 17% of the vote, winning an at-large seat on the Hoboken City Council for a four-year term in office. He was sworn in on July 1, 2009.

Bhalla served as the chairman of the Hoboken Democratic Party from 2010 to 2011. He also served as vice president of the council between 2010 and 2011, and he served as president of the city council from 2011 to 2012.

In 2011, Bhalla ran to represent the 33rd Legislative District in the New Jersey General Assembly. During his campaign, Bhalla emphasized that New Jersey had the highest property taxes in the country, and he advocated for lowering property taxes, offset by an increase to state income taxes. Bhalla focused on creating jobs and strengthening New Jersey's hate crime laws. Bhalla opposed New Jersey Governor Chris Christie's $1.3-billion cuts in the state's education budget. Bhalla called himself an Independent Democrat. Bhalla was defeated in the Democratic primary election, coming in third place, but he has stated that he still has political aspirations to be a legislator at the state or Federal level.

In 2012, following Superstorm Sandy, Bhalla distributed food to people at multiple locations in Hoboken.

Bhalla filed to run again to represent the 33rd District in the New Jersey General Assembly in 2013. The following month, Bhalla withdrew from the election when Carmelo Garcia's candidacy was cleared. Instead Bhalla ran for reelection to the Hoboken City Council. Bhalla received 14% of the vote, giving him a second four-year term in office.

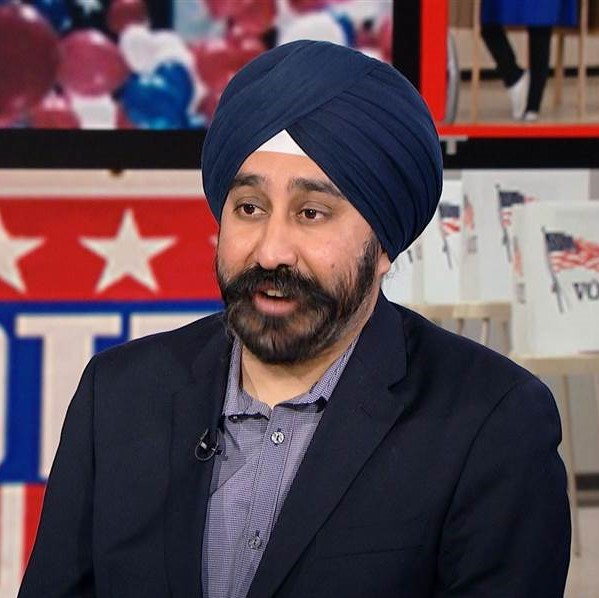
Bhalla during an interview on MSNBC on the day after his 2017 election win

==== Mayor of Hoboken ====
In 2017, Bhalla decided to run for a third term on the Hoboken City Council. When incumbent Hoboken Mayor Dawn Zimmer decided not to run for reelection, she endorsed Bhalla in a surprise press conference. During Bhalla's mayoral campaign, he advocated for response development, open-space initiatives, defending Hoboken's citizens' rights from the Trump administration, fiscal responsibility, holding the line on local taxes, and building a surplus for unanticipated city emergencies. On November 7, 2017, he was elected New Jersey's first Sikh mayor. (Note: Kash Gill was the first Sikh to be elected mayor in the United States when he was elected mayor of Yuba City, California, in 2009, but he did not wear a turban. Additionally, the Charlottesville City Council (Virginia) appointed councilmember Satyendra Huja, a Sikh who wears a turban, to the position of mayor in 2012.) Bhalla won the election with 33% of the vote. His term of office began January 1, 2018.

In 2018, Bhalla was censured by the New Jersey Supreme Court after a disciplinary board chided him for not setting aside over $6,000 for a former employee's retirement account between 2008 and 2009.

In 2021 Bhalla ran unopposed for a second term, which he won in November 2021.

As mayor of Hoboken, Bhalla has prioritized pedestrian and transportation safety. He announced a Vision Zero plan in 2019 and has spearheaded changes to Hoboken's streets and transportation policies. Bhalla welcomed Citi Bike to Hoboken, lowered the citywide speed limit to 20 miles per hour, made crosswalks more visible, installed more curb extensions, and increased the amount of bike lanes in Hoboken. Since then, there have been no traffic fatalities in Hoboken and the number of injuries have declined by 41%.

==== 2020 allegations of misconduct ====
In 2024, the former Hoboken Health and Human Services Director filed a lawsuit alleging quid pro quo, retaliation, and defamation by Mayor Bhalla. According to the lawsuit, Mayor Bhalla pressured him to engage in unlawful political maneuvers. This included a situation where Bhalla allegedly rescinded a previously awarded cannabis dispensary location due to political pressures from another mayor, in exchange for legal work for Bhalla's law firm. The director alleges that he was forced to resign after refusing to follow unlawful direction from the mayor. Following the events, he claims that Mayor Bhalla made false and damaging statements about him to third parties, including claims of engaging in illegal activities, which were allegedly made to protect Bhalla's political interests and were cited as reasons for his potential termination. In June 2025, the director was sentenced to 24 months in federal prison after pleading guilty to embezzling money from the city and filing a false tax return.

==== 2024 U.S. House election ====
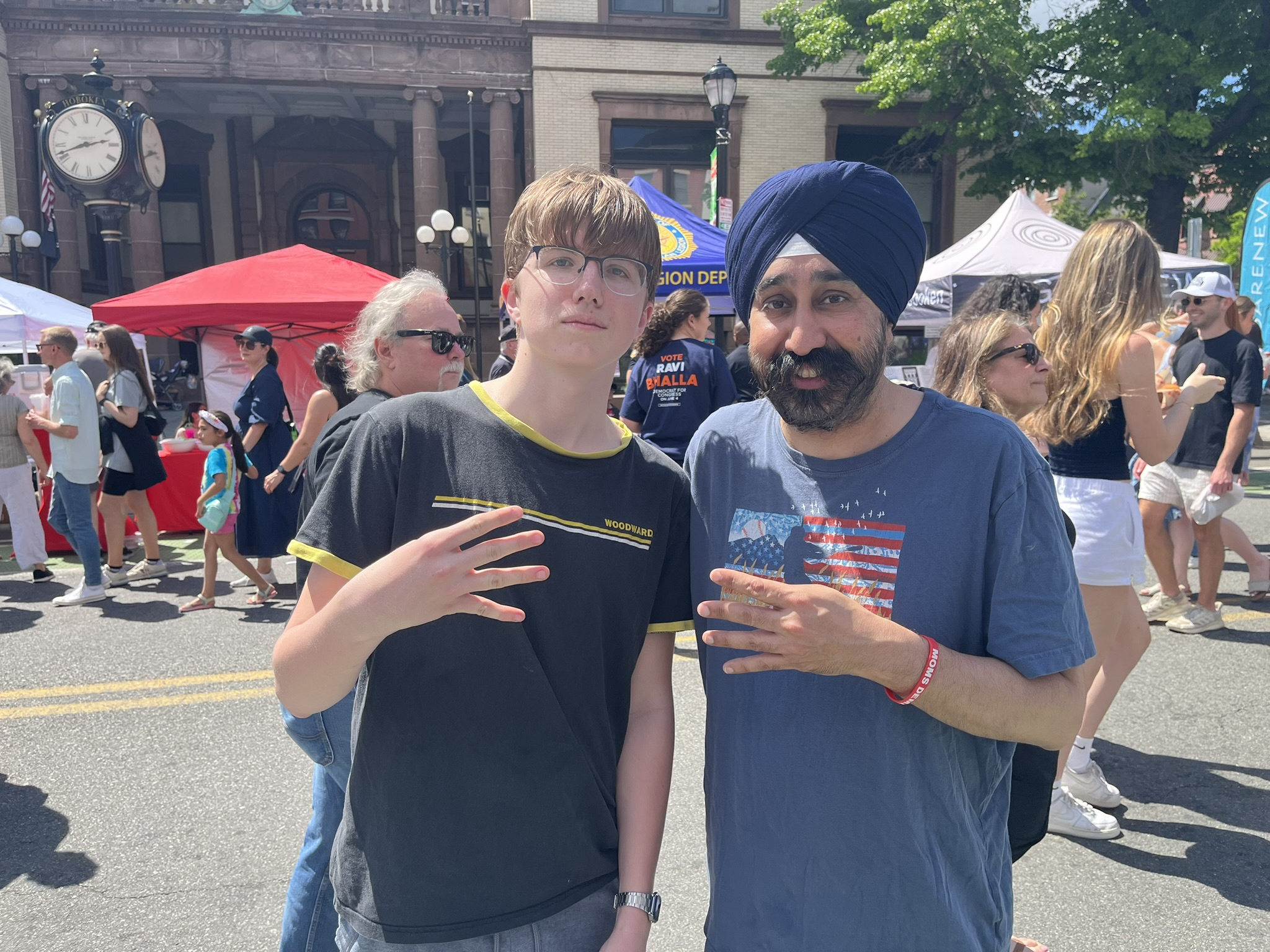
Bhalla with a fan during his campaign

In December 2023, Bhalla announced he would challenge incumbent U.S. Representative Rob Menendez in New Jersey's 8th congressional district in the 2024 election. His decision came after Menendez's father, Bob Menendez, was indicted on federal corruption charges in September. The AAPI Victory Fund, a political action committee, endorsed Bhalla's campaign in early 2024. A February poll showed both candidates were ‘statistically tied’ among primary voters. When Federal judge Zahid Quraishi struck down the "county line" primary ballot system and ordered the use of block ballots in the primary elections on 29 March 2024, Bhalla's chances increased. He celebrated the decision, having signed an amicus curiae brief in support of the lawsuit originally brought by Congressman Andy Kim, who Bhalla endorsed in the 2024 Senate election. An April poll conducted by a Global Strategy Group affiliated PAC showed Bhalla with a five-point lead over Menendez in the primary. However, many voters remained undecided. He participated in a primary debate hosted by the New Jersey Globe on 5 May 2024, followed by another debate on 28 May. During the campaign, Bhalla linked the elder Menendez's corruption charges to his opponent's campaign, accusing the younger Menendez of refusing to return his father's contributions, and criticizing him for not distancing himself from his father. Although, Menendez received more high-profile endorsements from various Senators and Representatives, Bhalla's campaign outraised him in campaign funding, the majority of which did not come from PACs. Bhalla lost the primary election in June 2024, netting 35.8% of votes.

2025 New Jersey General Assembly election

In January 2025, Bhalla announced he would not seek a third term as mayor of Hoboken. Later in the month, Bhalla announced he would run for state assembly in New Jersey's 32nd district. In June, Bhalla, along with Katie Brennan, won the Democratic primary for the New Jersey General Assembly in the 32nd Legislative District, narrowly defeating incumbent Assemblywoman Jessica Ramirez, virtually guaranteeing a general election victory in a district that tilts heavily towards Democrats. With the abolition of the county line that had given the Hudson County Democratic Committee (and county committees statewide) control over ballot placement, Bhalla and Brennan ran an "anti-establishment" campaign and won the primary, before going on to win the November general election by a 3–1 margin in the overwhelmingly Democratic district.

== Personal life ==
Bhalla has lived in Hoboken since 2000. He and his wife, Navneet (also known as Bindya), a human rights attorney, live with their children, Arza and Shabegh. He is of Punjabi descent.

== Electoral results ==
=== 2009 ===
2009 Council of Hoboken, New Jersey, At Large, General Election
| Party | Candidate | Votes | % |
|---|---|---|---|
| Nonpartisan | Carol Marsh | 3,719 | 13% |
| Nonpartisan | Ravi Bhalla | 3,698 | 13% |
| Nonpartisan | David Mello | 3,361 | 12% |
| Nonpartisan | Vincent Addeo | 2,624 | 9% |
| Nonpartisan | Raul Morales Jr. | 2,576 | 9% |
| Nonpartisan | Angel Alicea | 2,534 | 9% |
| Nonpartisan | Michael Novak | 2,513 | 9% |
| Nonpartisan | Anthony Pasquale | 2,418 | 9% |
| Nonpartisan | Frances Rhodes-Kearns | 2,415 | 9% |
| Nonpartisan | Chris Carbine | 705 | 3% |
| Nonpartisan | Timothy Occhipinti | 672 | 2% |
| Nonpartisan | Patricia Waiters | 569 | 2% |

2009 Council of Hoboken, New Jersey, At Large, Runoff Election
| Party | Candidate | Votes | % |
|---|---|---|---|
| Nonpartisan | Ravi Bhalla | 5,857 | 17% |
| Nonpartisan | Carol Marsh | 5,853 | 17% |
| Nonpartisan | David Mello | 5,648 | 17% |
| Nonpartisan | Vincent Addeo | 5,560 | 16% |
| Nonpartisan | Raul Morales Jr. | 5,431 | 16% |
| Nonpartisan | Angel Alicea | 5,422 | 16% |

=== 2011 ===
2011 New Jersey General Assembly, 33rd Legislative District, Democratic Party Primary Election
| Party | Candidate | Votes | % |
|---|---|---|---|
| Democratic | Ruben J. Ramos Jr. | 13,564 | 46% |
| Democratic | Sean Conners | 13,438 | 45% |
| Democratic | Ravi S. Bhalla | 2,781 | 9% |

=== 2013 ===
2013 Council of Hoboken, New Jersey, At Large, General Election
| Party | Candidate | Votes | % |
|---|---|---|---|
| Nonpartisan | David Mello | 4,828 | 15% |
| Nonpartisan | James F. Doyle | 4,727 | 15% |
| Nonpartisan | Ravinder S. Bhalla | 4,561 | 14% |
| Nonpartisan | Laura Miani | 2,974 | 9% |
| Nonpartisan | Eduardo Gonzalez | 2,955 | 9% |
| Nonpartisan | Joseph Mindak | 2,947 | 9% |
| Nonpartisan | Frank Raia | 2,880 | 9% |
| Nonpartisan | Peter Biancamano | 2,775 | 9% |
| Nonpartisan | Britney Montgomery-Cook | 2,214 | 7% |
| Nonpartisan | Patricia Waiters | 673 | 2% |
| Nonpartisan | Write-in | 25 | 0% |

=== 2017 ===
2017 Mayor of Hoboken, New Jersey, General Election
| Party | Candidate | Votes | % |
|---|---|---|---|
| Nonpartisan | Ravi Bhalla | 5,041 | 32.75% |
| Nonpartisan | Michael DeFusco | 4,557 | 29.6% |
| Nonpartisan | Anthony L. Romano | 2,804 | 18.21% |
| Nonpartisan | Jen Giattino | 2,537 | 16.48% |
| Nonpartisan | Karen Nason | 233 | 2% |
| Nonpartisan | Ronald Bautista | 201 | 1% |
| Nonpartisan | Write-in | 5 | 0% |

=== 2021 ===
Results
| Party | Candidate | Votes | % |
|---|---|---|---|
| Nonpartisan | Ravinder Bhalla | 8,771 | |
| Nonpartisan | Write-in | 612 | |
| Total votes | | 9,383 | |

=== 2024 ===
2024 Democratic primary results
| Party | Candidate | Votes | % |
|---|---|---|---|
| Democratic | Rob Menendez (incumbent) | 21,349 | 52.5 |
| Democratic | Ravinder Bhalla | 15,055 | 37.0 |
| Democratic | Kyle Jasey | 4,279 | 10.5 |
| Total votes | | 40,683 | 100.0 |

=== 2025 ===
2025 New Jersey General Assembly, 32nd Legislative District, Democratic Party Primary
| Party | Candidate | Votes | % |
|---|---|---|---|
| Democratic | Katie Brennan | 7,545 | 19.6 |
| Democratic | Ravinder Bhalla | 7,243 | 18.8 |
| Democratic | Jessica Ramirez (Incumbent) | 7.010 | 18.2 |
| Democratic | Jennie Pu | 5,653 | 14.7 |
| Democratic | Yousef Saleh | 5,612 | 14.6 |
| Democratic | Crystal Fonseca | 5,410 | 14.0 |
| Total votes | | 38,555 | 100.0 |

32nd Legislative District General Election
| Party | Candidate | Votes | % |
|---|---|---|---|
| Democratic | Katie Brennan | 37.932 | 39.0 |
| Democratic | Ravinder Bhalla | 36.306 | 37.3 |
| Republican | Stephen Bishop | 11,462 | 11.8 |
| Republican | Kaushal Patel | 11.350 | 11.7 |
| Total votes | | 97.293 | 100.0 |

== See also ==
- Civil rights law
- Indian Americans in New Jersey
- List of mayors of Hoboken
- Sikh Americans
