= John Allen (New Jersey politician) =

American politician

Member of the New Jersey General Assembly from the 32nd district
- In office January 9, 2024 – January 13, 2026 Serving with Jessica Ramirez
- Preceded by: Angelica M. Jimenez; Pedro Mejia
- Succeeded by: Ravinder Bhalla; Katie Brennan

Personal details
- Party: Democratic
- Education: Rutgers University; Rutgers Law School
- Website: Legislative webpage

John Allen is an American attorney and Democratic Party politician Who served as a member of the New Jersey General Assembly for the 32nd legislative district from 2024 to 2026. He is also an adjunct professor at the Stevens Institute of Technology. Allen is also the Chairman of the Board for Easterseals New Jersey, one the nation's oldest and largest charities empowering individuals with disabilities. https://nj.easterseals.com/board-of-directors

== Biography ==
Raised in Old Bridge Township, New Jersey, Allen attended the local public schools and was elected to serve on the board of education of the Old Bridge Township Public Schools while he was a student at Rutgers University. A graduate of Rutgers Law School, a lawyer by profession and a resident of Hoboken, New Jersey, Allen has been the chief of staff and the assistant corporation counsel for Ravinder Bhalla, the mayor of Hoboken.

== Elective office ==
In the wake of the 2021 apportionment, the reconfiguration of municipalities in the 32nd and 33rd districts and the incumbent Assembly members in those districts choosing to retire or run for other elective office, the Hudson County Democratic Organization chose newcomers Allen and Jessica Ramirez to run for the two Assembly seats. Allen and Ramirez defeated Republican Robert Ramos, the only other candidate running in the 2023 New Jersey General Assembly election. Allen was one of 27 members elected for the first time in 2023 to serve in the General Assembly, more than one-third of the seats.

=== Committees ===
Committee assignments for the 2024—2025 Legislative Session are:

- Financial Institutions and Insurance
- Housing
- Tourism, Gaming and the Arts

=== District 32 ===
Each of the 40 districts in the New Jersey Legislature has one representative in the New Jersey Senate and two representatives in the New Jersey General Assembly. The representatives from the 32nd District for the 2024—2025 Legislative Session are:

- Senator Raj Mukherji (D)
- Assemblyman John Allen (D)
- Assemblywoman Jessica Ramirez (D)

== Electoral history ==
32nd Legislative District General Election, 2023
Party	Candidate	Votes	%
Democratic	Jessica Ramirez	15,197	45.7
Democratic	John Allen	14,391	43.3
Republican	Robert Ramos	3,665	11.0
Total votes		33,253	100.0
Democratic hold			
Democratic hold			
