= Kashmir Gill =

American mayor

- ਕਸ਼ਮੀਰ ਗਿੱਲ

Mayor of Yuba City, California
- In office 2009–2010
- In office 2013–2014

Yuba City Council
- In office 2006–2010
- In office 2013–2014

Personal details
- Born: 1963 or 1964 (age 62–63) Lakhsian village, Hoshiarpur district, Punjab, India
- Spouse: Neena Gill
- Children: 3
- Education: California State University, Chico
- Occupation: Senior V.P.
- Profession: Banking

Kashmir "Kash" Gill (Punjabi: ਕਸ਼ਮੀਰ ਗਿੱਲ) is the former mayor of Yuba City, California. Gill served two terms as mayor, from 2009 to 2010 and from 2013 to 2014. Gill also served on the City Council of Yuba City. Gill was the first Sikh to be elected mayor in the United States.

== Early life ==
At three years old, Gill emigrated with his family from Lakhsina in the Hoshiarpur district of Punjab, India, after his uncle Bains sponsored them. Gill worked in his family's peach orchards and prune orchards until he was 13 years old. As an adult, Gill became the business manager of his family's farm.

Gill graduated from Yuba City High School, Yuba Community College, and California State University, Chico, where he earned a bachelor's degree in agricultural business in 1987. Gill graduated from California Agricultural Leadership Program and the Graduate School of Banking, Boulder, Colorado, in 2006.

== Professional career ==
As of 2000, Gill was vice president and regional manager of Butte Community Bank in Yuba City, California. In 2001, Gill was on the board of directors of the Yuba City Sikh Temple.

As of 2006, Gill was working at Banner Bank as senior vice president, where he leads the Northern California Agribusiness Division. Gill is an active member of the Republican Party.

== Political career ==
Gill ran for a seat on the five-member Yuba City Council in 2004, but Gill did not win a seat in the election.

Gill successfully ran for Yuba City Council in 2006. Gill ran for reelection to the Yuba City Council in 2008. Because Gill received the second-most votes in the election, he served as Yuba City's vice mayor in 2008, and Gill was subsequently sworn in as Yuba City's mayor on November 10, 2009. The position of mayor of Yuba City is held in rotation by the two individuals who received the most votes in city council elections. Gill was the first Punjabi American and first Sikh to be mayor of Yuba City. Gill was also one of the first Indian mayors in America, and the first Sikh to be elected mayor in the United States. Gill served a second term as vice-mayor of Yuba City from 2012 to 2013, and he served a second term as mayor of Yuba City from 2013 to 2014.

As mayor, Gill advocated for federal funds to be used for the city's levee upgrades. He also formed the gang task force and economic task force.

In addition to Gill's public service as mayor, vice-mayor, and council member for Yuba City, he has served as chair of the Yuba-Sutter Chamber of Commerce; member of the board of directors of the Fremont-Rideout Hospital Foundation; and member of the board of directors of the Sutter Health Foundation.

== Personal life ==
He is the son of Punjabi Sikh parents, and is of the Sikh faith. Kash is married to Neena Gill, and they have three children named Harveen, Rajan, and Preya.

== See also ==
- List of Indian Americans
