= Sacramento County Superior Court =

California superior court with jurisdiction over Sacramento Country

Superior Court of California, County of Sacramento
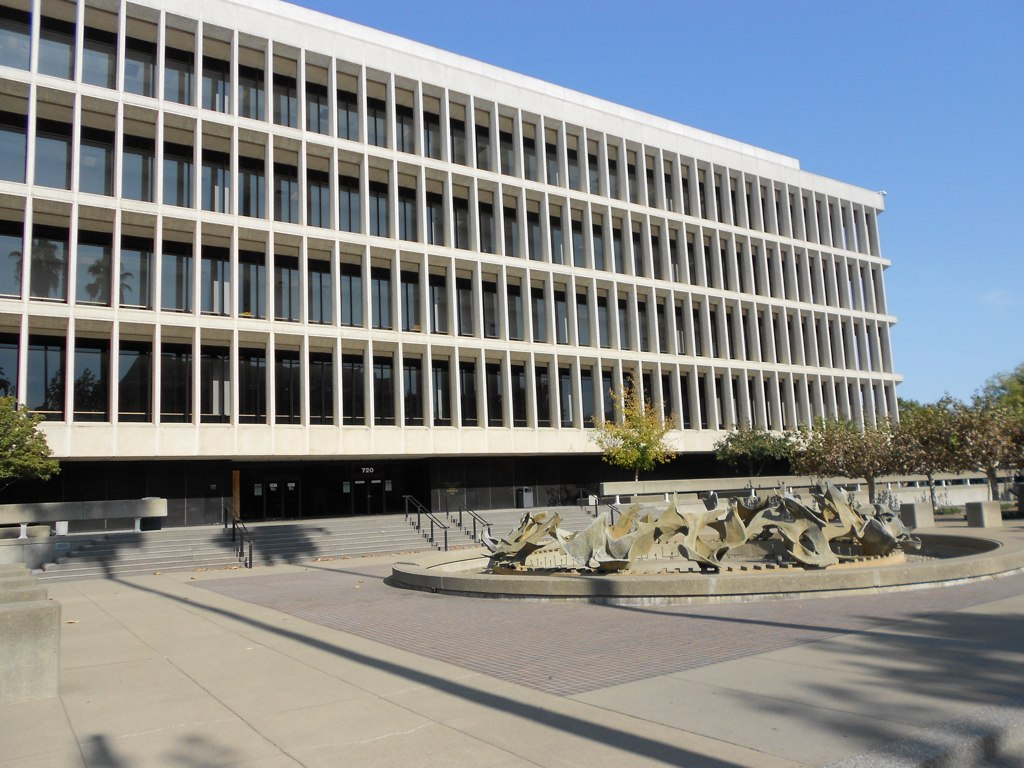
- Gordon D. Schaber Courthouse
- Established: 1850
- Jurisdiction: Sacramento County, California
- Location: Sacramento
- Appeals to: California Court of Appeal for the Third District
- Judge term length: 6 years
- Website: saccourt.ca.gov

Presiding Judge
- Currently: Hon. Lawrence G. Brown
- Since: Jan 1, 2026
- Lead position ends: Dec 31, 2027

Assistant Presiding Judge
- Currently: Hon. Steven M. Gevercer
- Since: Jan 1, 2026
- Lead position ends: Dec 31, 2027

Court Executive Officer
- Currently: Kelly Sullivan
- Since: Aug 4, 2025

The Superior Court of California, County of Sacramento, informally known as the Sacramento County Superior Court, is the California Superior Court located in Sacramento with jurisdiction over Sacramento County.

== Courthouses ==
Sacramento Superior Court locations:
1 Tani G. Cantil-Sakauye Sacramento County Courthouse (500 G St)
2 Hall of Justice (813 6th St) & Lorenzo Patiño Hall of Justice (651 I St)
3 William R. Ridgway Family Relations Courthouse (3341 Power Inn Rd)
4 Carol Miller Justice Center (301 Bicentennial Cir)
5 Juvenile Courthouse (9605 Kiefer Blvd)

=== Tani G. Cantil-Sakauye Courthouse ===
The Tani G. Cantil-Sakauye downtown courthouse is the main courthouse of the court. As well as providing the main trial courtrooms, the courthouse contains the administrative offices of the court (including the Presiding Judge), and the general civil and criminal case processing support services of the court system. The Tani G. Cantil-Sakauye Courthouse is located at 500 G Street.

=== Other courthouses ===
William R. Ridgeway Family Relations Courthouse

Family law and probate cases

Carol Miller Justice Center

Small claims, traffic, and unlawful detainer cases

Juvenile Courthouse

Juvenile Justice and Juvenile Dependency cases

Lorenzo Patiño Hall of Justice

Criminal cases

== Administration ==
Pursuant to California Government Code § 68070 and the Judicial Council California Rules of Court § 10.613, the Sacramento County Superior Court has adopted Local Rules for its government and the government of its officers.

== Officers ==
There are several officers of the court, including judges, jurors, commissioners, prosecutors, defense attorneys, clerks, bailiffs, and court reporters.

=== Judges ===
The current judges are:

- George A. Acero
- Stephen Acquisto
- James P. Arguelles
- Robert J. Artuz
- Bunmi O. Awoniyi
- Jaya Badiga
- Lee S. Bickley
- Thadd A. Blizzard
- Tami R. Bogert
- David W. Bonilla
- Kenneth Brody
- Lawrence G. Brown
- Shelleyanne Wai Ling Chang
- Alin Cintean
- Joseph M. Cress
- Donald J. Currier
- Brenda Dabney
- Lauri A. Damrell
- Carlton G. Davis
- Joginder S. Dhillon
- Philip A. Ferrari
- Curtis M. Fiorini
- Shauna Franklin
- Benjamin D. Galloway
- Jeffrey S. Galvin
- Matthew J. Gary
- Steven M. Gevercer
- Renuka George
- Maryanne G. Gilliard
- Helena R. Gweon
- Jonathan R. Hayes
- Amy Holliday
- Misha Igra
- Augustin R. Jimenez
- Christopher E. Krueger
- Stephen Lau
- Alyson L. Lewis
- Kristina B. Lindquist
- Deborah D. Lobre
- Kevin J. McCormick
- James E. McFetridge
- Kenneth C. Mennemeier
- Richard C. Miadich
- Andi Mudryk
- Jose A. Olivera
- Rei Onishi
- Delbert W. Oros
- Alexander J. Pal
- Jerome Price, Jr.
- Satnam Rattu
- Jennifer K. Rockwell
- Ernest W. Sawtelle
- Peter K. Southworth
- Myrlys Stockdale-Coleman
- Richard K. Sueyoshi
- Michael W. Sweet
- Jill H. Talley
- Scott L. Tedmon
- Martin E. Tejeda
- Kara K. Ueda
- Julie Weng-Gutierrez
- Laurel D. White
- Steve White
- Allison Williams
- Peter M. Williams
- Julie G. Yap
- Alison Zuvela

=== Commissioners ===
A commissioner is a subordinate judicial officer elected by the judges of the Court and given the power to hear and make decisions in certain kinds of legal matters, similar to the United States magistrate judge. Their jurisdiction includes, but is not limited to, traffic matters, family law and juvenile cases, criminal misdemeanors, and criminal felony cases through the preliminary hearing stage.

The Sacramento County Superior Court has 8 commissioners assigned as follows:

Benjamin Cassady - Criminal Arraignments

Marlene E. Clark - Family Law, Domestic Violence and Elder Abuse Restraining Orders

Richard Clark - Family Law, Domestic Violence and Elder Abuse Restraining Orders

Ryan Davis - Family Law

Scott P. Harman - Family Law/Child Support

Alicia Hartley - Family Law/Child Support

Heath T. Langle - Probate

James Morris - Traffic

=== Prosecutors ===
The Sacramento County District Attorney, currently Thien Ho, prosecutes crimes before the court on behalf of California, Sacramento County, and all cities and special districts within Sacramento County.

=== Public Defenders ===
The Sacramento County Public Defender provides criminal defense services for those unable to afford private counsel. The current public defender is Amanda M. Benson.

For cases where the public defender has a legal conflict or is otherwise unable to provide services, services are provided by a group of private attorneys compensated by the Court. The County of Sacramento coordinates this process through the Conflict Criminal Defenders Office.

=== Bailiffs ===
The functions of the bailiff are carried out by Sacramento County Sheriff under contract.

== See also ==
- Sacramento First Courthouse
