= Satnam Rattu =

American jurist

Judge Satnam Rattu

Sacramento County Superior Court
- Incumbent
- Assumed office 2022

Personal details
- Born: Yuba City, California, United States

Satnam Rattu is a judge of the Superior Court of Sacramento County in California and he is a Democrat.

== Early life and education ==
He was born and raised in the Indian family of Mohinder Singh Rattu and Gurpal Kaur Rattu of Punjabi Ravidassia origin in Yuba City, California and attended Yuba City High School. He received his undergraduate degree from University of California, Davis. Rattu earned his Juris Doctor from University of the Pacific, McGeorge School of Law.

== Legal career ==
Rattu was appointed to serve as a judge in the Sacramento County Superior Court by governor Gavin Newsom on October 7, 2022, filling the vacancy created by the retirement of the Hon. Kevin R. Culhane. Prior to this appointment, Rattu served as a deputy district attorney at the Sacramento County District Attorney’s Office since 2008. Rattu was a law clerk at Freidberg & Parker from 2006 to 2007.
