= California Commission for Economic Development =

The California Commission for Economic Development (CED) was a bipartisan advisory board on economic development issues to the executive and legislative leadership of the State of California. Established in 1971, the CED was composed of six members of the State legislature and ten members of the public appointed by the Governor and represented several industries within California.

== History ==
The Commission served the state under the statutory Chairmanship of Lieutenant Governors from 1971 through 1994, but in the seven years that followed, funding for the Commission was not included in the annual state budgets. Recognizing the need for additional economic development efforts, Governor Gray Davis and the Legislature restored funding for the Commission in 2002. In mid-2003, the Governor appointed a sufficient number of members to establish a quorum. Under a previous Chair, Lt. Governor Cruz Bustamante, the Commission held its first official meeting in more than ten years on December 15, 2003. The most recent Chair, prior to Gavin Newsom, was Lieutenant Governor John Garamendi. Under Garamendi, quarterly meetings took place in July and November 2007 and February and May 2008. He ended his term as Lieutenant Governor of California when he was elected into office in 2009. The current Lieutenant Governor, Gavin Newsom, provided an agenda for economic growth and competitiveness for California in 2011. This agenda was the first statewide economic plan in over ten years. By 2016, over 75-percent of the recommendations presented in the plan had been at least partially implemented. As of 2024, the commission has not received any individualized funding, instead being folded into the larger Governor’s Office of Business and Economic Development.

== Duties ==
Pursuant to California Code §14999-14999.10, the Commission has the following powers and authority to carry out its statutory duties:

- Evaluating specific economic development problems and providing recommendations for possible solutions.
- Maintaining communication about economic dilemmas between the state government and the private sector.
- Make recommendations to legislation regarding ongoing economic development projects and programs .
- Evaluate development programs to ensure cost efficiency.
- Preparing specialized reports, which can include key secondary outcomes on economic development of programs and/or regulations, to support and guide the Governor or Legislature.

== Objectives ==
The Commission for Economic Development assesses issues relating to developing the economy and workforce, trade and government efficiency. Its many goals include increasing effectiveness of the government and its partners in developing and augmenting the workforce of California. While maintaining the workforce, the commission seeks to assemble a strong connection between workforce development and a growing economy, all while encouraging education. The large-scale goal of the CED is to unite all major aspects of an economy (development, small businesses, trade, regulations, etc.) to transform California into a productive and continuously growing entity.
