= List of flag bearers for Equatorial Guinea at the Olympics =

Equatorial Guinea at the Olympics
- IOC code: GEQ
- NOC: Equatoguinean Olympic Committee
- Medals: Gold 0 Silver 0 Bronze 0 Total 0

Summer appearances
- 1984; 1988; 1992; 1996; 2000; 2004; 2008; 2012; 2016; 2020; 2024

This is a list of flag bearers who have represented Equatorial Guinea at the Olympics.

Flag bearers carry the national flag of their country at the opening ceremony of the Olympic Games.

#	Event year	Season	Flag bearer	Sport	Ref.
1	1984	Summer	Secundino Borabota	Athletics	
2	1988	Summer	Manuel Rondo	Athletics	
3	1992	Summer	Ruth Mangue	Athletics	
4	1996	Summer	Gustavo Envela	Athletics	
5	2000	Summer	Eric Moussambani	Swimming	
6	2004	Summer	Emilia Mikue Ondo	Athletics	
7	2008	Summer	Emilia Mikue Ondo	Athletics	
8	2012	Summer	Bibiana Olama	Athletics	
9	2016	Summer	Reïna-Flor Okori	Athletics	
10	2020	Summer	Benjamín Enzema	Athletics	
10	2020	Summer	Alba Mbo Nchama	Athletics	
11	2024	Summer	Sefora Ada Eto	Athletics	
11	2024	Summer	Higinio Ndong Obama	Swimming	

== See also ==
- Equatorial Guinea at the Olympics
