= List of Equatorial Guinean records in athletics =

The following are the national records in athletics in Equatorial Guinea maintained by its national athletics federation: Federación Ecuatoguineana de Atletismo (FEA).

== Outdoor ==
Key to tables: Awaiting ratification Record not kept by FEA Not ratified or later rescined by FEA

=== Men ===
Event	Record	Athlete	Date	Meet	Place	Ref.
100 m	10.60 (Note: wind assisted)	Gustavo Envela	31 May 1986	Prefontaine Classic	Eugene, United States	
100 m	10.64 NWI	Gustavo Envela	July 1984		Hong Kong	
200 m	21.33 NWI	Gustavo Envela	18 May 1985	Prefontaine Classic	Eugene, United States	
400 m	46.78	Gustavo Envela	14 June 1986		Sacramento, United States	
800 m	1:51.54	Benjamín Enzema	20 June 2017		Cergy-Pontoise, France	
800 m	1:50.91 (Note: Track marks made at the 2018 African Championships in Asaba are rejected by World Athletics due to a lack of Athletic Facility Certification as required by World Athletics rule 140)	Benjamín Enzema	2 August 2018	African Championships	Asaba, Nigeria	
1500 m	3:46.14	Benjamín Enzema	14 July 2018		Kortrijk, Belgium	
3000 m	8:24.48	Benjamín Enzema	1 June 2018		Angoulême, France	
5000 m	14:18.46	Benjamín Enzema	23 June 2018		Blois, France	
10,000 m	31:52.2 h	José Luis Ebatela	7 July 2002		Mongomo, Equatorial Guinea	
Half marathon	1:08:06	Benjamín Enzema	18 March 2018	Semi-marathon du Massif Forestier	Nuaillé, France	
25 km (road)	2:23:33+	Benjamín Enzema	12 May 2019	Marathon de la Loire	Saumur, France	
Marathon	2:21:22	Benjamín Enzema	12 May 2019	Marathon de la Loire	Saumur, France	
110 m hurdles	16.52 NWI	Alfonso Ekwunezi Ikuga	3 May 2009		Mataró, Spain	
400 m hurdles	57.43	Juan Cabrera Nchama	29 April 2017		Santa Cruz de Tenerife, Spain	
3000 m steeplechase	9:04.54	Roberto Mandje	7 June 2008		San Diego, United States	
High jump	1.90 m	Lucero Eningo Delgado	24 April 1994		Bata, Equatorial Guinea	
Pole vault	2.20 m	Alfonso Ekwunezi Ikuga	30 September 2007		Sabadell, Spain	
Long jump	7.20 m NWI	Lucero Eningo Delgado	24 April 1994		Bata, Equatorial Guinea	
Triple jump	14.70 m NWI	Luis Dyangani Oko	3 June 2015		Los Realejos, Spain	
Shot put	12.53 m	Benito Alu	17 June 1995		Malabo, Equatorial Guinea	
Discus throw	40.53 m	Sergio Mba Nzo	5 July 2002		Mongomo, Equatorial Guinea	
Hammer throw	20.70 m	Castro Santander	17 June 1995		Malabo, Equatorial Guinea	
Javelin throw	46.70 m	Manases Micha	7 December 2002		Malabo, Equatorial Guinea	
Decathlon	3752 pts h	Alfonso Ekwunezi Ikuga	29–30 September 2007		Sabadell, Spain	
Decathlon	100m / Long jump / Shot put / High jump / 400m / 110m H / Discus / Pole vault / Javelin / 1500m; 11.6 / 5.29 m / 7.97 m / 1.45 m / 57.8 / 17.8 / 21.29 m / 2.20 m / 15.53 m / 5:44.6					
20 km walk (road)						
50 km walk (road)						
4 × 100 m relay	43.9 h	Equatorial Guinea; Juvencio Pidal; Norberto Nsue; Bernardo Elonga; Félix Mahama	5 June 1996		Malabo, Equatorial Guinea	
4 × 400 m relay	3:42.93	Equatorial Guinea	20 April 2002		Yaoundé, Cameroon	

=== Women ===
Event	Record	Athlete	Date	Meet	Place	Ref.
100 m	12.18 (+1.5 m/s)	Teresa Mangue Eyene	18 June 2016		Alcobendas, Spain	
200 m	25.14 (+1.2 m/s)	Teresa Mangue Eyene	20 July 2014		Valladolid, Spain	
400 m	56.37	Frida Ondo	20 July 2003		Madrid, Spain	
800 m	2:15.72	Emilia Mikue Ondo	25 August 2007	World Championships	Osaka, Japan	
1500 m	5:10.6 h	Mercedes Asue Elo	7 July 2002		Mongomo, Equatorial Guinea	
3000 m	11:15.03	Dolores Okenve	1 May 2010		Amposta, Spain	
5000 m	19:07.4 h	Susana Esono Edu	7 February 1998		Malabo, Equatorial Guinea	
10,000 m	43:24.5 h	Mercedes Asue Elo	5 July 2002		Mongomo, Equatorial Guinea	
Marathon						
100 m hurdles	15.93 (+0.8 m/s)	Teresa Mangue Eyene	4 June 2017	Meeting "Paco Sanchez Vargas"	Granada, Spain	
400 m hurdles	1:08.98	Marlene Mevong	4 August 2009		Mataró, Spain	
3000 m steeplechase						
High jump	1.56 m	Bibiana Olama	25/27 October 2012		Malabo, Equatorial Guinea	
Pole vault						
Long jump	5.29 m	Marlene Mevong	5 July 2008		Zaragoza, Spain	
Long jump	5.29 m	Marlene Mevong	30 May 2009		Zaragoza, Spain	
Triple jump	10.21 m	Cathérine Mvo	25 May 2001		Yaoundé, Cameroon	
Shot put	11.07 m (Note: record set during heptathlon competition)	Bibiana Olama	3 October 2009	Jeux de la Francophonie	Beirut, Lebanon	
Discus throw	24.99 m	Dolores Lopelo Cobea	5 July 2002		Mongomo, Equatorial Guinea	
Hammer throw	40.14 m	Crescencia Nnang Mba	9 May 2015		Genoa, Italy	
Javelin throw	33.04 m (Note: record set during heptathlon competition)	Bibiana Olama	4 October 2009	Jeux de la Francophonie	Beirut, Lebanon	
Heptathlon	4114 pts A	Bibiana Olama	30–31 July 2010	African Championships	Nairobi, Kenya	
Heptathlon	100m H / High jump / Shot put / 200m / Long jump / Javelin / 800m; 15.95 (−1.1 m/s) / 1.48 m / 10.75 m / 27.82 (+0.5 m/s) / 4.54 m (+2.2 m/s) / 31.12 m / 2:34.75					
20 km walk (road)						
50 km walk (road)						
4 × 100 m relay	52.2 h	Equatorial Guinea; Susana Esono Edu; Mari Luz Obono Ndong; Esperanza Obono Ela; Mari Paz Mosanga Motanga	11 June 1999		Malabo, Equatorial Guinea	
4 × 100 m relay	49.05 (Note: regarded as unlikely)	Equatorial Guinea	20 April 2002		Yaoundé, Cameroon	
4 × 400 m relay						

== Indoor ==
=== Men ===
Event	Record	Athlete	Date	Meet	Place	Ref.
60 m	7.27	Norberto Nsue Ondo	7 March 1999	World Indoor Championship	Maebashi, Japan	
200 m	23.16	Samuel Olo Manel	7 February 2014		Athlone, Ireland	
200 m	23.00	Vanderley Panzo (Note: citizenship unclear; Spanish by World Athletics source)	8 February 2025	Spanish Championships	Madrid, Spain	
400 m	51.04	Juan Cabrera Nchama	4 March 2017	Spanish Junior Championships	Valencia, Spain	
800 m	1:58.19	Benjamín Enzema	9 March 2012	World Championships	Istanbul, Turkey	
1500 m	3:53.07	Benjamín Enzema	18 February 2018		Liévin, France	
3000 m						
60 m hurdles						
High jump						
Pole vault						
Long jump	5.77 m	Norberto Nsue Ondo	7 March 1997	World Championships	Paris, France	
Triple jump	14.47 m	Luis Dyangani Oko	31 January 2015	XXXIV Copa de SM el Rey y SM la Reina de Clubes	San Sebastián, Spain	
Shot put	14.47 m	Luis Dyangani	31 January 2015		San Sebastián, Spain	
Heptathlon						
Heptathlon	60m / Long jump / Shot put / High jump / 60m H / Pole vault / 1000m					
5000 m walk						
4 × 400 m relay						

=== Women ===
Event	Record	Athlete	Date	Meet	Place	Ref.
60 m	7.68	Teresa Mangue Eyene	14 March 2015	Spanish Youth Championships	San Sebastián, Spain	
200 m	24.73	Teresa Mangue Eyene	13 February 2016	Andalusian U-23 Championships	Antequera, Spain	
400 m	59.42	Marlene Mevong	14 February 2009		San Sebastián, Spain	
800 m						
1500 m						
3000 m						
60 m hurdles						
High jump						
Pole vault						
Long jump						
Triple jump	9.92 m	Samira Atomre	16 December 2007		Dijon, France	
Shot put						
Pentathlon						
Pentathlon	60m H / High jump / Shot put / Long jump / 800m					
3000 m walk						
4 × 400 m relay						
