= Equatorial Guinea at the 2011 World Championships in Athletics =

- WA code: GEQ
- National federation: Federación Ecuatoguineana de Atletismo

in Daegu
- Competitors: 0
- Medals: Gold 0 Silver 0 Bronze 0 Total 0

World Championships in Athletics appearances
- 1987; 1991; 1993; 1995; 1997; 1999; 2001; 2003; 2005; 2007; 2009; 2011; 2013; 2015; 2017; 2019; 2022; 2023

Equatorial Guinea did not compete at the 2011 World Championships in Athletics from August 27 to September 4 in Daegu, South Korea.

== Team selection ==
A team of 2 athletes was announced to represent the country in the event due to the preliminary Entry List. However, nobody appeared on the Official Start List.

KEY:	Did not participate	Competed in another event

	Event	Athlete
Men	100 metres	Antimo Oyono
Women	100 metres	Beatriz Mangue
