= Equatorial Guinea at the 2025 World Aquatics Championships =

- Flag of Equatorial Guinea
- World Aquatics code: GEQ
- National federation: Equatorial Guinean Swimming Federation

in Singapore
- Competitors: 1 in 1 sport
- Medals: Gold 0 Silver 0 Bronze 0 Total 0

World Aquatics Championships appearances
- 2019; 2022; 2023; 2024; 2025

Equatorial Guinea is competing at the 2025 World Aquatics Championships in Singapore from 11 July to 3 August 2025.

== Competitors ==
The following is the list of competitors in the Championships.

Sport	Men	Women	Total
Swimming	1	0	1
Total	1	0	1

== Swimming ==
Men

Athlete	Event	Heat		Semifinal		Final	
Athlete	Event	Time	Rank	Time	Rank	Time	Rank
Higinio Ndong Obama	50 m freestyle	DNS					
Higinio Ndong Obama	50 m butterfly	DNS					
