= Equatorial Guinea at the 1988 Summer Olympics =

- IOC code: GEQ
- NOC: Olympic Committee of Equatorial Guinea

in Seoul
- Competitors: 6 in 1 sport
- Flag bearer: Manuel Rondo
- Medals: Gold 0 Silver 0 Bronze 0 Total 0

Summer Olympics appearances (overview)
- 1984; 1988; 1992; 1996; 2000; 2004; 2008; 2012; 2016; 2020; 2024

Equatorial Guinea competed at the 1988 Summer Olympics in Seoul, South Korea. The National Olympic Committee sent 6 competitors (4 men and 2 women) to the Games in one sport.

== Competitors ==
The following is the list of number of competitors in the Games.

Sport	Men	Women	Total
Athletics	4	2	6
Total	4	2	6

== Athletics (track and field) ==
Key
Note–Ranks given for track events are within the athlete's heat only
Q = Qualified for the next round
q = Qualified for the next round as a fastest loser or, in field events, by position without achieving the qualifying target
NR = National record
N/A = Round not applicable for the event
Bye = Athlete not required to compete in round
NM = No mark

Track and road events
Men

Athletes	Events	Round 1		Round 2		Semifinal		Final	
Athletes	Events	Time	Rank	Time	Rank	Time	Rank	Time	Rank
Secundino Borabota	100 metres	11.52	8	did not advance					
Gustavo Envela	200 metres	22.33	5	did not advance					
Gustavo Envela	400 metres	48.11	6	did not advance					
Bernardo Elonga	1500 metres	4:16.40	14	n/a		did not advance			
Manuel Rondo	5000 metres	16:44.13	19	n/a		did not advance			

Women

Athletes	Events	Round 1		Round 2		Semifinal		Final	
Athletes	Events	Time	Rank	Time	Rank	Time	Rank	Time	Rank
Rosa Mbuamangongo	200 metres	31.12	6	did not advance					
Juliana Obiong	400 metres	1:07.58	7	did not advance					
