= Equatorial Guinea at the 2004 Summer Olympics =

- IOC code: GEQ
- NOC: Olympic Committee of Equatorial Guinea

in Athens
- Competitors: 2 in 1 sport
- Flag bearers: Emilia Mikue Ondo (opening); Roberto Mandje (closing)
- Medals: Gold 0 Silver 0 Bronze 0 Total 0

Summer Olympics appearances (overview)
- 1984; 1988; 1992; 1996; 2000; 2004; 2008; 2012; 2016; 2020; 2024

Equatorial Guinea competed at the 2004 Summer Olympics in Athens, which was held from 13 to 29 August 2004. The country's participation at Athens marked its sixth appearance in the Summer Olympics since its début at the 1984 Summer Olympics. The delegation included two athletics competitors: Roberto Mandje and Emilia Mikue Ondo in the long and middle distance disciplines respectively. Mikue Ondo was selected as the flag bearer for the opening ceremony. Both athletes did not advance further than the first round of their respective events with Mandje failing to make the start of the men's 3000 metres steeplechase.

== Background ==
Equatorial Guinea participated in six Summer Games between its début at the 1984 Summer Olympics in Los Angeles, and the 2004 Summer Olympics in Athens. No Equatoguinean athlete has ever won a medal at the Olympic Games. Equatorial Guinea participated in the Athens Summer Games from 13 to 29 August 2004. The two athletes selected to represent Equatorial Guinea in the Athens Games were athletics competitors Roberto Mandje and Emilia Mikue Ondo. Eric Moussambani, who gained international recognition with his performance at the previous Olympics in Sydney in 2000, was denied entry into the Athens Olympics as officials could not find his passport photograph. Mikue Ondo was chosen as the flag bearer for the opening ceremony while Mandje carried it at the closing ceremony.

== Athletics ==
Roberto Mandje was the only male athlete representing Equatorial Guinea at the Athens Olympics. He had not previously competed in any prior Olympic Games. In an interview with BBC Spor prior to the Games, Mandje spoke of the pressure he faced from people in his home country expecting him to do well and wanted to quash comparisons to Moussambani he had been receiving: "I feel pretty ready and we will see how I finish. I hope I don't turn it into a racewalking event!"

He was drawn in the first heat of the men's 1500 metres on 20 August, finishing twelfth out of thirteen competitors, with a time of 4 minutes and 3.37 seconds. Mandje's time set a new national record in the discipline. Overall he finished 37th out of 39 runners who ran the whole heat, (Note: Two runners, Peter Roko Ashak and Samwel Mwera, did not start.) and did not make the semi-finals since only the top five finishers in each heat and the quickest next nine runners could advance to the next round. He was drawn in heat one of the men's 3000 metres steeplechase the following day but was unable to start the discipline.

Competing at her first Olympic Games, Emilia Mikue Ondo was the youngest athlete to represent Equatorial Guinea in Athens at the age of 19. She competed in the women's 800 metres and was drawn in the fourth heat. Mikue Ondo completed the heat in a time of two 2 minutes, 22.88 seconds for seventh and last out of her heat. As the top three runners in each heat and the following six quickest were allowed to go through to the semi-finals, Mikue Ondo's competition ended in the first round since she was 41st out of 42 finishers overall. (Note: One competitor, Anhel Cape, did not finish.)

=== Key ===
- Note–Ranks given for track events are within the athlete's heat only
- DNS = Did not start
- NR = National record
- N/A = Round not applicable for the event

=== Men ===
Athlete	Event	Heat		Semifinal		Final	
Athlete	Event	Result	Rank	Result	Rank	Result	Rank
Roberto Mandje	1500 m	4:03.37 NR	12	Did not advance			
Roberto Mandje	3000 m steeplechase	DNS		—		Did not advance	

=== Women ===
Athlete	Event	Heat		Semifinal		Final	
Athlete	Event	Result	Rank	Result	Rank	Result	Rank
Emilia Mikue Ondo	800 m	2:22.88	7	Did not advance			
