= Equatorial Guinea at the 1996 Summer Olympics =

- IOC code: GEQ
- NOC: Olympic Committee of Equatorial Guinea

in Atlanta
- Competitors: 5 in 1 sport
- Flag bearer: Gustavo Envela
- Medals: Gold 0 Silver 0 Bronze 0 Total 0

Summer Olympics appearances (overview)
- 1984; 1988; 1992; 1996; 2000; 2004; 2008; 2012; 2016; 2020; 2024

Equatorial Guinea was represented at the 1996 Summer Olympics in Atlanta, Georgia, United States by the Olympic Committee of Equatorial Guinea.

In total, five athletes including four men and one woman represented Equatorial Guinea in one sport: athletics.

== Background ==
The Olympic Committee of Equatorial Guinea was formed in 1980 and was recognised by the International Olympic Committee in 1984. Equatorial Guinea made their Olympic debut at the 1984 Summer Olympics in Los Angeles, California, United States, sending a delegation of four athletes. At the 1988 Summer Olympics in Seoul, South Korea, Equatorial sent an increased delegation of six which included their first female Olympic athlete. They sent a record delegation of seven athletes to the 1992 Summer Olympics in Barcelona, Spain. The 1996 Summer Olympics in Atlanta, Georgia, United States marked their fourth appearance at the Olympics. Prior to 1996, Equatorial Guinea had only been represented in the athletics events and they had not won an Olympic medal.

== Competitors ==
In total, five athletes represented Equatorial Guinea at the 1996 Summer Olympics in Atlanta, Georgia, United States in one sport.

Sport	Men	Women	Total
Athletics	4	1	5
Total	4	1	5

== Athletics ==
In total, five Equatoguinean athletes participated in the athletics events – Casimiro Asumu Nze in the men's 400 m and the men's 4 x 100 m relay, Bonifacio Edu in the men's 100 m and the men's 4 x 100 m relay, Gustavo Envela in the men's 200 m and the men's 4 x 100 m relay, Ponciano Mbomio in the men's 4 x 100 m relay and Juliana Obiong in the women's 100 m.

The athletics events took place at the Centennial Olympic Stadium in Atlanta from 26 July to 3 August 1996.

Men

Athletes	Events	Heat Round 1		Heat Round 2		Semifinal		Final	
Athletes	Events	Time	Rank	Time	Rank	Time	Rank	Time	Rank
Bonifacio Edu	100 metres	11.87	104	did not advance					
Gustavo Envela	200 metres	22.09	75	did not advance					
Casimiro Asumu Nze	400 metres	50.14	56	did not advance					
Ponciano Mbomio; Casimiro Asumu Nze; Bonifacio Edu; Gustavo Envela	4 x 100 metres relay	45.63	32	N/A		did not advance			

Women

Athletes	Events	Heat Round 1		Heat Round 2		Semifinal		Final	
Athletes	Events	Time	Rank	Time	Rank	Time	Rank	Time	Rank
Juliana Obiong	100 metres	13.88	55	did not advance					
