= Equatorial Guinea at the 1992 Summer Olympics =

- IOC code: GEQ
- NOC: Olympic Committee of Equatorial Guinea

in Barcelona
- Competitors: 7 in 1 sport
- Medals: Gold 0 Silver 0 Bronze 0 Total 0

Summer Olympics appearances (overview)
- 1984; 1988; 1992; 1996; 2000; 2004; 2008; 2012; 2016; 2020; 2024

Equatorial Guinea competed at the 1992 Summer Olympics in Barcelona, Spain.

== Competitors ==
The following is the list of number of competitors in the Games.

Sport	Men	Women	Total
Athletics	5	2	7
Total	5	2	7

== Athletics (track and field) ==
Key

- Note–Ranks given for track events are within the athlete's heat only
- Q = Qualified for the next round
- q = Qualified for the next round as a fastest loser or, in field events, by position without achieving the qualifying target
- NR = National record
- N/A = Round not applicable for the event
- Bye = Athlete not required to compete in round
- NM = No mark

Track and road events
Men

Athletes	Events	Round 1		Round 2		Semifinal		Final	
Athletes	Events	Time	Rank	Time	Rank	Time	Rank	Time	Rank
Gustavo Envela	100 metres	10.65	4	did not advance					
Juan Vicente Matala	200 metres	DSQ		did not advance					
Eulogio Ngache	400 metres	50.83	8	did not advance					
Emiliano Buale	800 metres	1:58.95	7	n/a		did not advance			
Bernardo Elonga	1500 metres	4:25.78	11	n/a		did not advance			

Women

Athletes	Events	Round 1		Round 2		Semifinal		Final	
Athletes	Events	Time	Rank	Time	Rank	Time	Rank	Time	Rank
Magdalena Ansue	100 metres	DSQ		did not advance					
Ruth Mangue	200 metres	27.65	7	did not advance					
Ruth Mangue	400 metres	1:03.32	7	did not advance					

== Sources ==
- Official Olympic Reports
