= Equatorial Guinea at the 2008 Summer Olympics =

- IOC code: GEQ
- NOC: Olympic Committee of Equatorial Guinea

in Beijing
- Competitors: 3 in 2 sports
- Flag bearer: Emilia Mikue Ondo
- Medals: Gold 0 Silver 0 Bronze 0 Total 0

Summer Olympics appearances (overview)
- 1984; 1988; 1992; 1996; 2000; 2004; 2008; 2012; 2016; 2020; 2024

Equatorial Guinea competed at the 2008 Summer Olympics in Beijing, which was held from 8 to 24 August 2008. The country's participation at Beijing marked its seventh appearance in the Summer Olympics since its début at the 1984 Summer Olympics. The delegation included the sprinter Reginaldo Ndong, middle-distance runner Emilia Mikue Ondo and half-middleweight judoka José Mba Nchama. Ndong and Mikue Ondo qualified for the Games through wildcard places and Mba Nchama entered through his ranking at the 2007 African Judo Championships. Mikue Ondo was chosen as the flag bearer for both the opening and closing ceremonies. Ndong and Mikue Ondo progressed no farther than the first round of their respective events and Mba Nchama was eliminated from contention in the second round of the contest.

== Background ==
Equatorial Guinea participated in seven Summer Games between its début at the 1984 Summer Olympics in Los Angeles and the 2008 Summer Olympics in Beijing. No Equatoguinean athlete has ever won a medal at the Olympic Games. Equatorial Guinea participated in the Beijing Summer Games from 8 to 24 August 2008. The three athletes sent to the Beijing Games were the athletics competitors Reginaldo Ndong and Emilia Mikue Ondo and the judoka José Mba Nchama. The short-distance swimmer Eric Moussambani did not compete at the Games because he reportedly had taken up a coaching role. Mikue Ondo was selected to be the flag bearer for both the opening and closing ceremonies.

== Athletics ==
=== Events ===
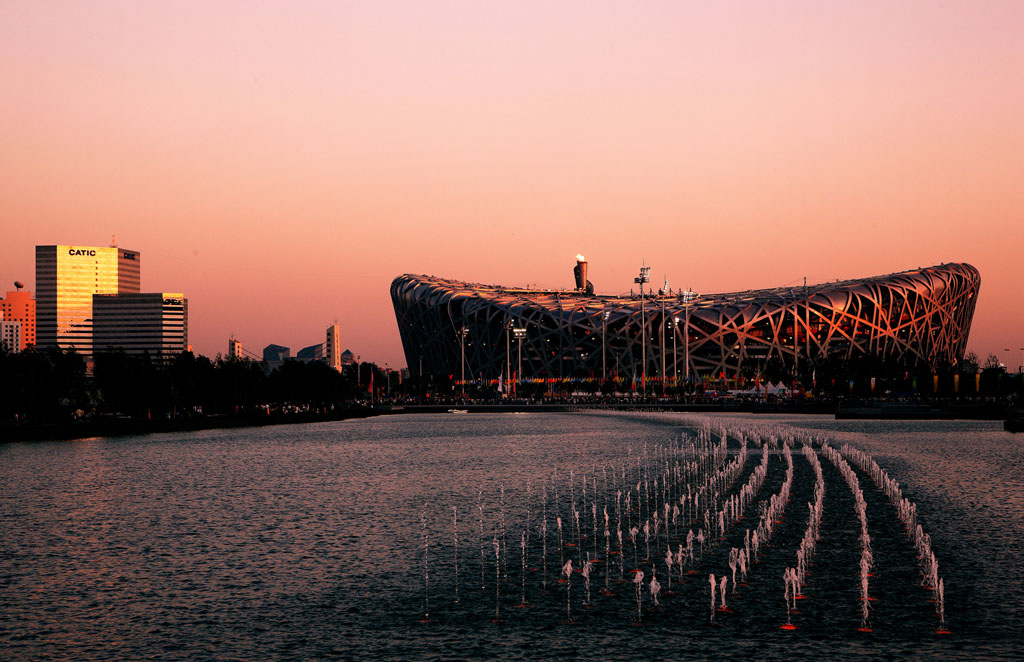
The Beijing National Stadium, where Ndong and Mikue Ondo competed in athletics events.

At the age of 21, Reginaldo Ndong was the youngest athlete to represent Equatorial Guinea at the Beijing Summer Games. He had not entered any previous Olympic Games. Ndong qualified for the Games by using a wildcard since his fastest time during the qualification period of 11.53 seconds, set at the 2007 All-Africa Games, was 1.25 seconds slower than the "B" standard entry time for the men's 100 metres. He was drawn in the seventh heat on 15 August, finishing eighth (and last) out of all competitors, with a time of 11.61 seconds. Overall Ndong placed 79th out of 80 runners and did not progress to the semi-finals as he was 1.15 seconds slower than the slowest three qualifiers.

Competing at her second Olympic Games, Emilia Mikue Ondo was the sole female athlete for Equatorial Guinea at these Games and was 23 at the time of the quadrennial event. She qualified for the Games through a wildcard place because her quickest time during the qualification period of 2 minutes, 15.72 seconds, recorded at the 2007 World Championships in Athletics, was 14.42 seconds slower than the "B" qualifying standard for her event, the women's 800 metres. Mikue Ondo was drawn in heat four on 15 August, and finished sixth (and last) of all the runners who completed the event, with a time of 2 minutes, 20.69 seconds. She finished 39th out of 40 finishers overall, (Note: Three other athletes were disqualified, and one did not finish.) and did not advance into the semi-finals after being 16.84 seconds slower than the slowest qualifier.

Key

- Note–Ranks given for track events are within the athlete's heat only
- Bye = Athlete not required to compete in round

Men

Athlete	Event	Heat		Quarterfinal		Semifinal		Final	
Athlete	Event	Result	Rank	Result	Rank	Result	Rank	Result	Rank
Reginaldo Ndong	100 m	11.61	8	did not advance					

Women

Athlete	Event	Heat		Semifinal		Final	
Athlete	Event	Result	Rank	Result	Rank	Result	Rank
Emilia Mikue Ondo	800 m	2:20.69	6	did not advance			

== Judo ==
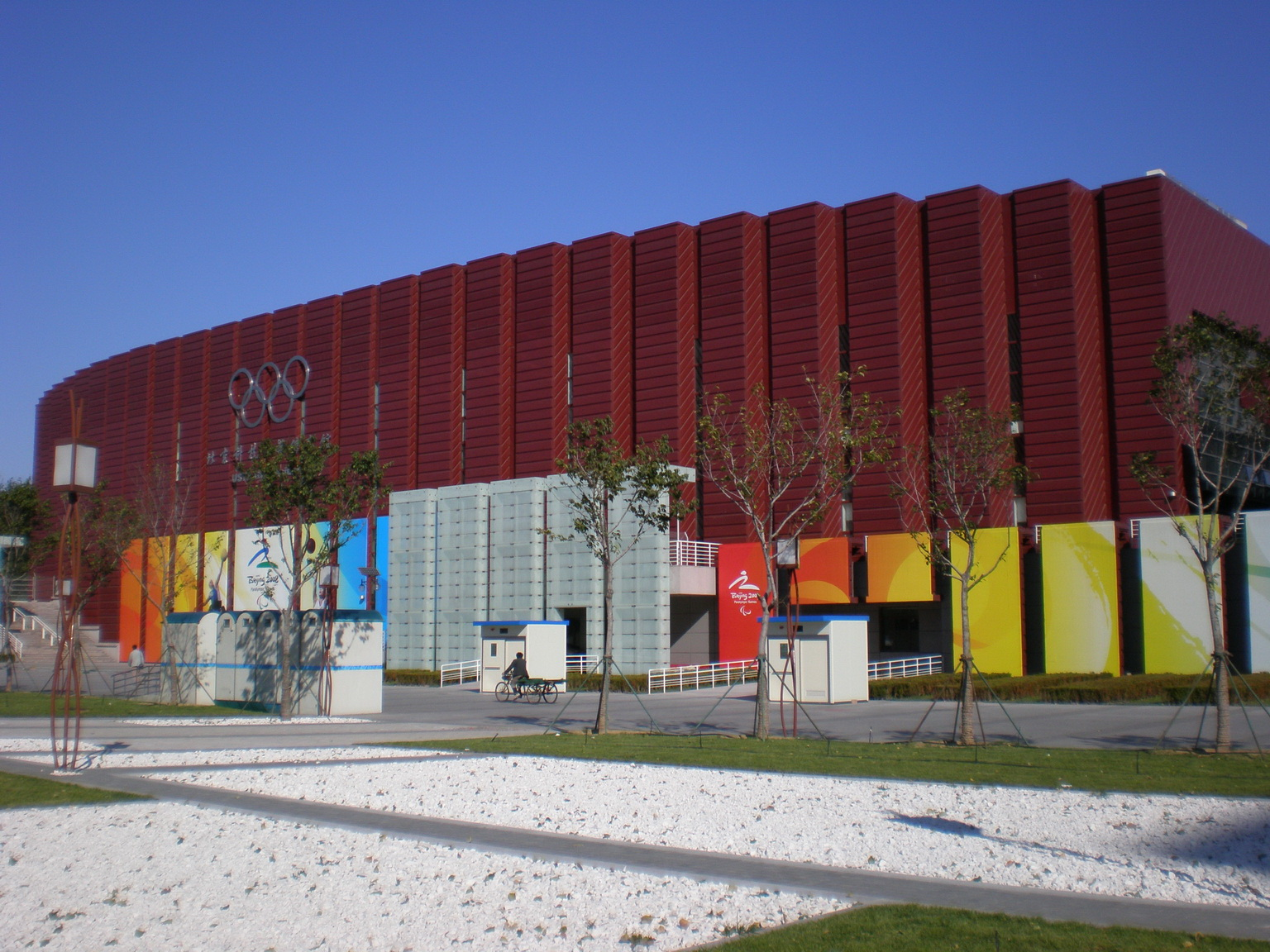
The Beijing Science and Technology University Gymnasium, where Mba Nchama took part in a Judo competition.

José Mba Nchama represented Equatorial Guinea in men's judo. At the time of the Games, he was 42 years old and was the oldest person to represent his country at the Beijing Summer Olympics. Mba Nchama gained qualification for the men's half-middleweight (81 kg) judo competition through his ranking in the 2007 African Judo Championships. He spent time with the Spanish team to prepare himself for the Games. Mba Nchama received a bye for the second preliminary match, before losing out by an automatic ippon and a kata-gatame (seven mat holds) to Srđan Mrvaljević of Montenegro, and therefore that was the end of his competition. After his match, he stated that while he would have preferred to have advanced further in the competition, he did not rule out competing in the 2012 Summer Games in London, "The work, the result and the spirit of the Beijing Games have been amazing, unrepeatable, from the most important to the last detail, although I would have liked to go further in sports."

Athlete	Event	Preliminary	Round of 32	Round of 16	Quarterfinals	Semifinals	Repechage 1	Repechage 2	Repechage 3	Final / BM	
Athlete	Event	Opposition Result	Opposition Result	Opposition Result	Opposition Result	Opposition Result	Opposition Result	Opposition Result	Opposition Result	Opposition Result	Rank
José Mba Nchama	Men's −81 kg	Bye	Mrvaljević (MNE); L 0000–1011	did not advance							
