= Central Africans in the United States =

United States residents or citizens of recent Central African descent and heritage

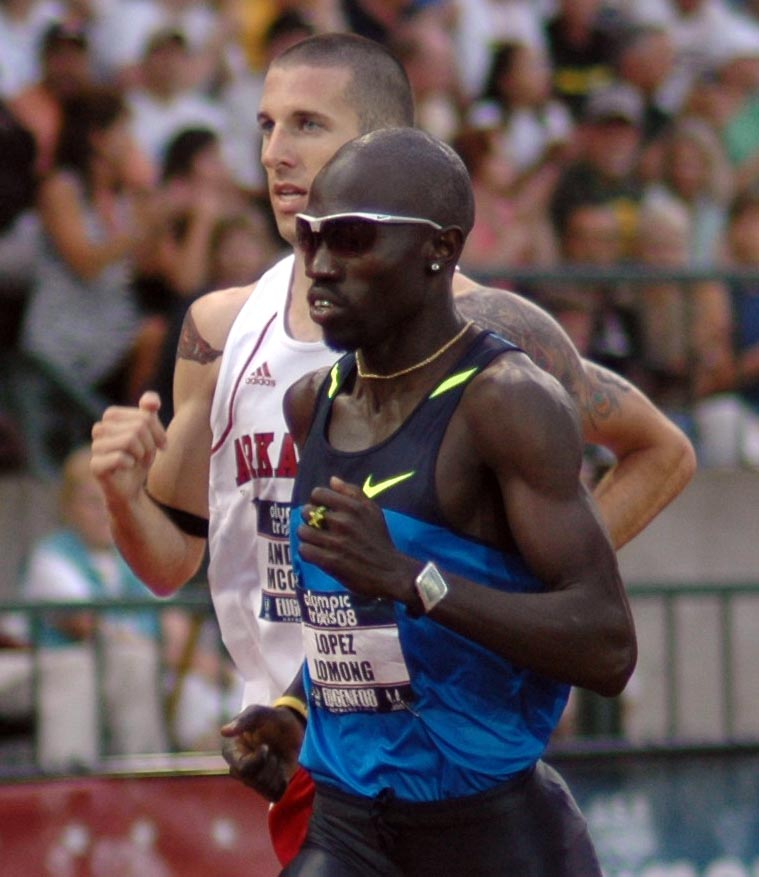
- Lopez Lomong

Languages
- Main American English; French; Portuguese; Spanish; Dinka; Fang

Central Africans in the United States are Americans with ancestry from Central Africa.

They include:

- Cameroonian Americans
- Central African Americans
- Congolese Americans
- Equatoguinean Americans
- Gabonese Americans
- São Toméan Americans

== History ==
Migration from Central Africa to the United States increased during the late twentieth and early twenty-first centuries through employment-based migration, educational opportunities, family reunification, and refugee resettlement. The United States has admitted significant numbers of refugees from Central African countries, particularly the Democratic Republic of the Congo, since the 2000s, with Congolese refugees becoming one of the largest refugee groups resettled in the country during the 2010s.

== Demographics ==
People of Central African origin in the United States include immigrants and descendants from countries such as Cameroon, the Central African Republic, Chad, the Democratic Republic of the Congo, the Republic of the Congo, Equatorial Guinea, Gabon, and São Tomé and Príncipe.

Many Central African immigrants reside in metropolitan areas with established African immigrant communities, including the Washington metropolitan area, New York City, Houston, Minneapolis–Saint Paul, and Dallas–Fort Worth.

== Notable people ==
- Lopez Lomong: South Sudanese-American track and field athlete and former Olympian.
- Serge Ibaka: Congolese-Spanish professional basketball player who spent part of his youth in the Democratic Republic of the Congo.

== See also ==
- Central Africa
