= Equatorial Guinea at the 2000 Summer Olympics =

- IOC code: GEQ
- NOC: Olympic Committee of Equatorial Guinea

in Sydney
- Competitors: 4 in 2 sports
- Flag bearer: Eric Moussambani
- Medals: Gold 0 Silver 0 Bronze 0 Total 0

Summer Olympics appearances (overview)
- 1984; 1988; 1992; 1996; 2000; 2004; 2008; 2012; 2016; 2020; 2024

Equatorial Guinea participated in the 2000 Summer Olympics in Sydney, Australia, which was held from 15 September to 1 October 2000. The country's participation in Sydney marked its fifth appearance in the Summer Olympics since its debut at the 1984 Summer Olympics. The delegation included one middle-distance runner, one short-distance sprinter and two swimmers: José Luis Ebatela Nvo, Mari Paz Mosanga Motanga, Eric Moussambani and Paula Barila Bolopa respectively. All four athletes qualified for the games through wildcard places. Moussambani was selected as the flag bearer for the opening ceremony. The four athletes were unable to advance beyond the first rounds of their respective events, with Moussambani and Bolopa attracting attention for their poor performances, but were applauded by the crowds.

== Background ==
Equatorial Guinea participated in five Summer Olympic Games between its debut at the 1984 Summer Olympics in Los Angeles, United States and the 2000 Summer Olympics in Sydney, Australia. No Equatoguinean athlete has ever won a medal at the Olympic Games. Equatorial Guinea participated in the Sydney Summer Games from 15 September to 1 October 2000. The four athletes who were selected to compete at the Sydney Summer Games were athletics competitors José Luis Ebatela Nvo and Mari Paz Mosanga Motanga and swimmers Eric Moussambani and Paula Barila Bolopa. Along with the four athletes, the team was accompanied by their manager Enrique Roca Nguba and attache Derrick Samuel Heywood. Moussambani was selected as the flag bearer for the opening ceremony.

== Competitors ==
The following is the list of number of competitors in the Games.

Sport	Men	Women	Total
Athletics	1	1	2
Swimming	1	1	2
Total	2	2	4

== Athletics ==
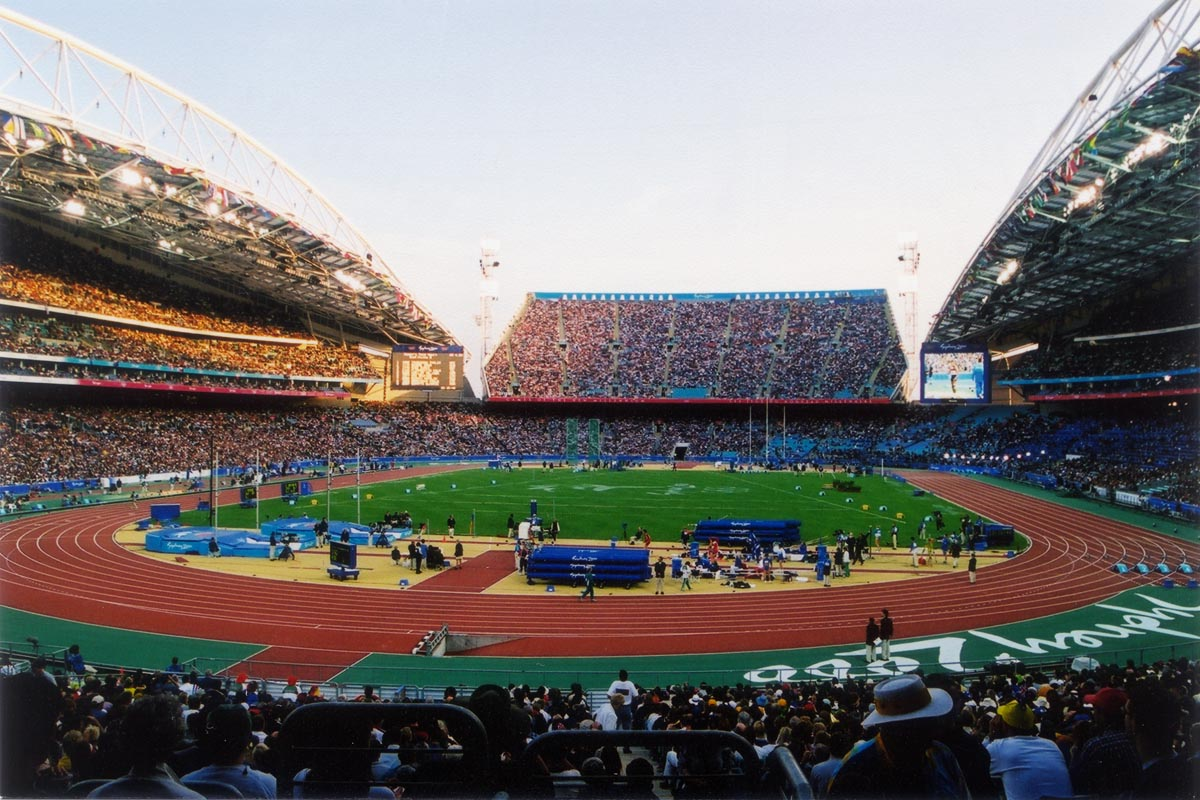
The Sydney Olympic Stadium where Nvo and Motanga competed in athletics events

José Luis Ebatela Nvo was the oldest person to represent Equatorial Guinea at the Sydney Summer Games at the age of 27. He had not participated in any previous Olympic Games. Nvo qualified for the Games through a wildcard place because his fastest time of four minutes and 15.22 seconds, recorded in the Equatorial Guinean capital of Malabo on 27 April 1998, was 35.72 seconds slower than the "B" qualifying standard for his event, the men's 1500 metres. In an interview before the Games he said entering the Olympics was the culmination of his career regardless of his finishing position. Nvo was drawn in the competition's second heat on 25 September, finishing 13th (and last) out of all athletes, with a time of four minutes and 6.14 seconds. He finished 40th overall out of all the finishing runners, (Note: One athlete, Anthony Whiteman, did not finish.) and did not advance to the semi-finals because he was 15.18 seconds slower than the slowest athlete who made the later stages.

At the age of 17, Mari Paz Mosanga Motanga was the youngest person to take part for Equatorial Guinea in the Sydney Olympic Games, and made her first appearance in the quadrennial event. Like Nvo, she qualified for the Games by using a wildcard because her quickest time of 13.62 seconds, set at the 1999 World Youth Championships in Athletics, was 2.02 seconds slower than the "B" qualifying standard for her event, the women's 100 metres. She took part in the contest's first heat in the first round on 23 September, finishing seventh out of eight competitors, with a time of 12.91 seconds. As the first three finishers of each heat and the next two quickest progressed to the next round Motanga was eliminated and placed 75th out of 84 entrants. After her heat ended, Motanga stated that while she would have preferred to have clinched the victory, she had to be realistic and was now able to compare her time with the remainder of the world.

=== Key ===
- Note–Ranks given for track events are within the athlete's heat only
- NR = National record

=== Men ===
Athlete	Event	Heat		Semifinal		Final	
Athlete	Event	Result	Rank	Result	Rank	Result	Rank
José Luis Ebatela Nvo	1500 m	4:06.14	13	did not advance			

=== Women ===
Athlete	Event	Heat		Semifinal		Final	
Athlete	Event	Result	Rank	Result	Rank	Result	Rank
Mari Paz Mosanga Motanga	100 m	12.91	7	did not advance			

== Swimming ==
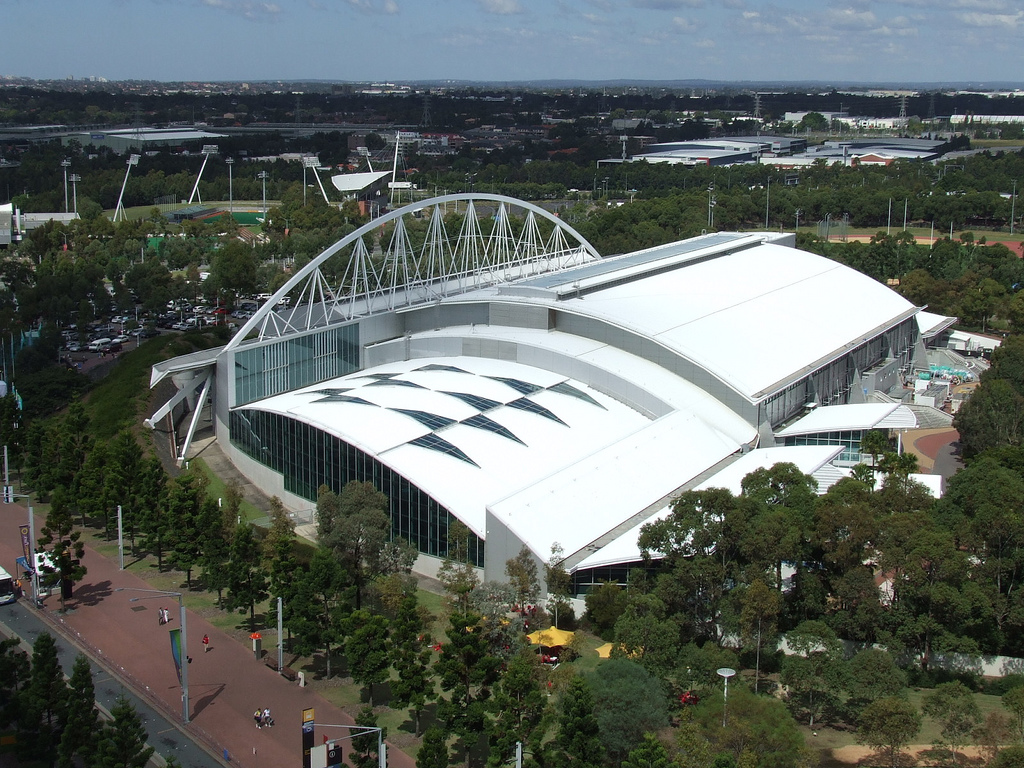
The Sydney Olympic Park Aquatic Centre where Moussambani and Bolopa competed in swimming events.

At the age of 22, Eric Moussambani was the sole male swimmer to compete for Equatorial Guinea at the Sydney Summer Games. He had not taken part in any previous Olympic Games. Moussambani attained qualification to the Games through a wildcard place because he did not meet the minimum qualification standards for the men's 100 metre freestyle, and was the first Equatoguinean athlete to compete in the discipline at an international level. Before the Games Moussambani had never seen a 50-metre (160 ft) long Olympic-size swimming pool. He took up swimming eight months before the Olympics and had practiced in a lake, and later a 20-metre (66 ft) swimming pool in a hotel in Malabo, and trained by himself early in the morning for three days a week. After arriving in Sydney, Moussambani trained with the United States swimming team and received additional assistance from a South African coach in order to improve his technique.

He was drawn in the event's first heat on 19 September, finishing first out of three entered swimmers, with a time of one minute and 52.72 seconds. The time established a new Equatoguinean swimming record in the discipline. (Note: Moussambani's time was 30 seconds slower than Arnold Guttman's 100 metre freestyle winning time at the 1896 Summer Olympics and seven second slower than Pieter van den Hoogenband's time which won him the 200 metre freestyle gold medal.) Moussambani was the sole competing swimmer after the heat's two other competitors were disqualified for false starts. He used a large amount of energy in the first 50 metres, and as his legs stiffened, his pace reduced. Officials decided against retrieving him from the pool after he was observed to sink below the water shortly before finishing and he was cheered by the crowd throughout. Overall Moussambani finished 71st (and last) out of all athletes, (Note: Two swimmers, Karim Bare and Farkhod Oripov, were disqualified.) and did not progress into the semi-finals after finishing one minute and 2.91 seconds slower than the slowest swimmer who made the later rounds. After completing the event, he said that it was "a very special moment" of which he would not forget and the crowd cheering motivated him to finish: "Gold medal is not everything in the Olympics. I am really happy with what happened, it was all worth it. I want to come back next time for the 2004 games in Athens." Moussambani earned admiration from millions of people around the world, received a plethora of publicity for his effort, and was given the nickname "Eric the Eel" by the press.

Paula Barila Bolopa was Equatorial Guinea's only female competitor to participate in swimming at the Sydney Olympic Games and was 20 years old at the time of the quadrennial event. She had not entered any previous Olympic Games. Like Moussambani, Bolopa qualified for the Games as a wildcard because she did not meet the minimum qualification standards for the women's 50 metre freestyle. She began swimming two and a half months before the Games. Bolopa took part in the first heat on 22 September, finishing second out of three entered participants, with a time of one minute and 3.97 seconds. The time set a new record as the slowest for a female athlete in the Olympic history of the women's 50 metre freestyle and was double the slowest time of the fastest overall swimmer in the displicine. She received loud support and encouragement from spectators. Bolopa finished second behind the heat's winner Moe Thu Aung of Myanmar (26.80 seconds) after the third participant Fatema Hameed Gerashi of Bahrain was disqualified for a false start. She finished 73rd and last out of all swimmers, (Note: One competitor, Fatema Hameed Gerashi, was disqualified.) and did not progress into the semi-finals because she was 35.90 seconds slower than the slowest competitor who advanced beyond the first round. After the event, Bolopa said that she was very tired because it was the first time she had swum in an Olympic-sized swimming pool.

=== Men ===
Athlete	Event	Heat		Semifinal		Final	
Athlete	Event	Time	Rank	Time	Rank	Time	Rank
Eric Moussambani	100 m freestyle	1:52.72 NR	1	did not advance			

=== Women ===
Athlete	Event	Heat		Semifinal		Final	
Athlete	Event	Time	Rank	Time	Rank	Time	Rank
Paula Barila Bolopa	50 m freestyle	1:03.97	2	did not advance			
