= Olympic Spirit =

IOC officially sanctioned program

Olympic Spirit is an officially sanctioned programme of the International Olympic Committee. A number of initiatives are underway in Canada (Vancouver hosts the 2010 Olympic Winter Games), Beijing (host of the 2008 Summer Olympics), London (host of the 2012 Summer Olympics), Japan, Asia, the Middle East, Europe and the Americas.

== International Olympic Committee Official Programme ==
The mission of Olympic Spirit is "to build a peaceful and better world in the Olympic Spirit which requires mutual understanding with a spirit of friendship, solidarity and fair play - Olympic Spirit strives to inspire and motivate the youth of the world to be the best they can be through educational and entertaining interactive challenges. Olympic Spirit seeks to instill and develop the values and ideals of Olympism in those who visit and to promote tolerance and understanding in these increasingly troubled times in which we live, to make our world a more peaceful place."

Olympic Spirit "will give Olympic athletes and sports much higher profiles and the increased attention they deserve... People – young and old alike – will be able to experience the sports and the intensity of the competitions personally through interactive exhibits and demonstrations [giving] everyone attending a sincere appreciation for what the athletes experience – and endure. The Canadian Olympic Committee is thrilled to be part of such a fun, exciting and dynamic project."

== General concept ==
More generally, the term "Olympic spirit" is an oft-referred-to but perhaps vaguely defined concept associated with the Olympic Games. Some media equate it with Pierre de Coubertin's statement that "The important thing is not to win, but to take part", and view athletes who try their best but finish last as epitomising the "Olympic spirit". Thus the Agence France-Presse wrote: "True Olympic spirit is often found away from gold medallists with their agents and sponsorship deals -- it is found in its purest sense in those that come last." It cited Eric Moussambani, Paula Barila Bolopa, Abdul Baser Wasiqi, Pyambuugiin Tuul, Charles Olemus, Mala Sakonninhom, Luvsanlkhündegiin Otgonbayar, Mira Kasslin and Samia Hireche as incarnations of the Olympic spirit. In 2000, CNN published an article on Eric Moussambani entitled "Olympic spirit: Swimmer competes for love of sport". In 2008, a press officer with the Chilean Tennis Federation described Nicolás Massú as having "really demonstrated the Olympic spirit: the effort, the struggle, his refusal to give up".
