= Equatorial Guinea at the 2012 Summer Olympics =

- IOC code: GEQ
- NOC: Olympic Committee of Equatorial Guinea

in London
- Competitors: 2 in 1 sport
- Flag bearer: Bibiana Olama
- Medals: Gold 0 Silver 0 Bronze 0 Total 0

Summer Olympics appearances (overview)
- 1984; 1988; 1992; 1996; 2000; 2004; 2008; 2012; 2016; 2020; 2024

Equatorial Guinea competed at the 2012 Summer Olympics in London, which was held from 27 July to 12 August 2012. The country's participation at London marked its eighth appearance in the Summer Olympics since its début at the 1984 Summer Olympics. The delegation included two track and field athletes, Benjamín Enzema and Bibiana Olama who both qualified for the Games via wildcard places because their fastest times did not meet the required qualification standards. Olama was selected as the flag bearer for both the opening and closing ceremonies. Both athletes did not advance beyond the first round of their respective events.

== Background ==
Equatorial Guinea participated in eight Summer Olympic Games between its début at the 1984 Summer Olympics in Los Angeles, United States and the 2012 Summer Olympics in London, England. No Equatoguinean athlete has ever won a medal at the Olympic Games. Equatorial Guinea participated in the London Summer Olympics from 27 July to 12 August 2012. The nation sent two athletes to the London Games: athletics competitors Benjamín Enzema and Bibiana Olama; the latter was chosen to be the flag bearer for both the opening and closing ceremonies. The country's Olympic women's football team was disqualified from their qualification stage after it was discovered that they fielded an ineligible player. The Equatorial Guinea delegation was led by the NOC president Manuel Sabino Asumu Kawan and the country's Ambassador in London, Mari-Cruz Evuna Andeme. The athletes were coached by Jose Moises Bodipo Minter, and the competitors said that despite training being difficult in Equatorial Guinea, they wanted to establish a good reputation for their country.

== Athletics ==
Benjamin Enzema was the only male athlete representing Equatorial Guinea at the London Olympics. He had not previously competed in any previous Olympic Games. Enzema qualified for the Games via a wildcard because his best time of 1 minute, 56.23 seconds, set at the 2012 African Championships in Athletics, was 9.93 seconds slower than the "B" standard entry time for the men's 800 metres. He was drawn in the event's seventh heat on 6 August, finishing seventh out of eight competitors, with a time of 1 minute, 57.47 seconds. Overall, Ezema finished 49th out of 52 athletes, (Note: Two other athletes were disqualified, and one did not start.) and failed to qualify for the semi-finals since he was 11.05 seconds slower than the slowest athlete in his heat who advanced to the later stages.

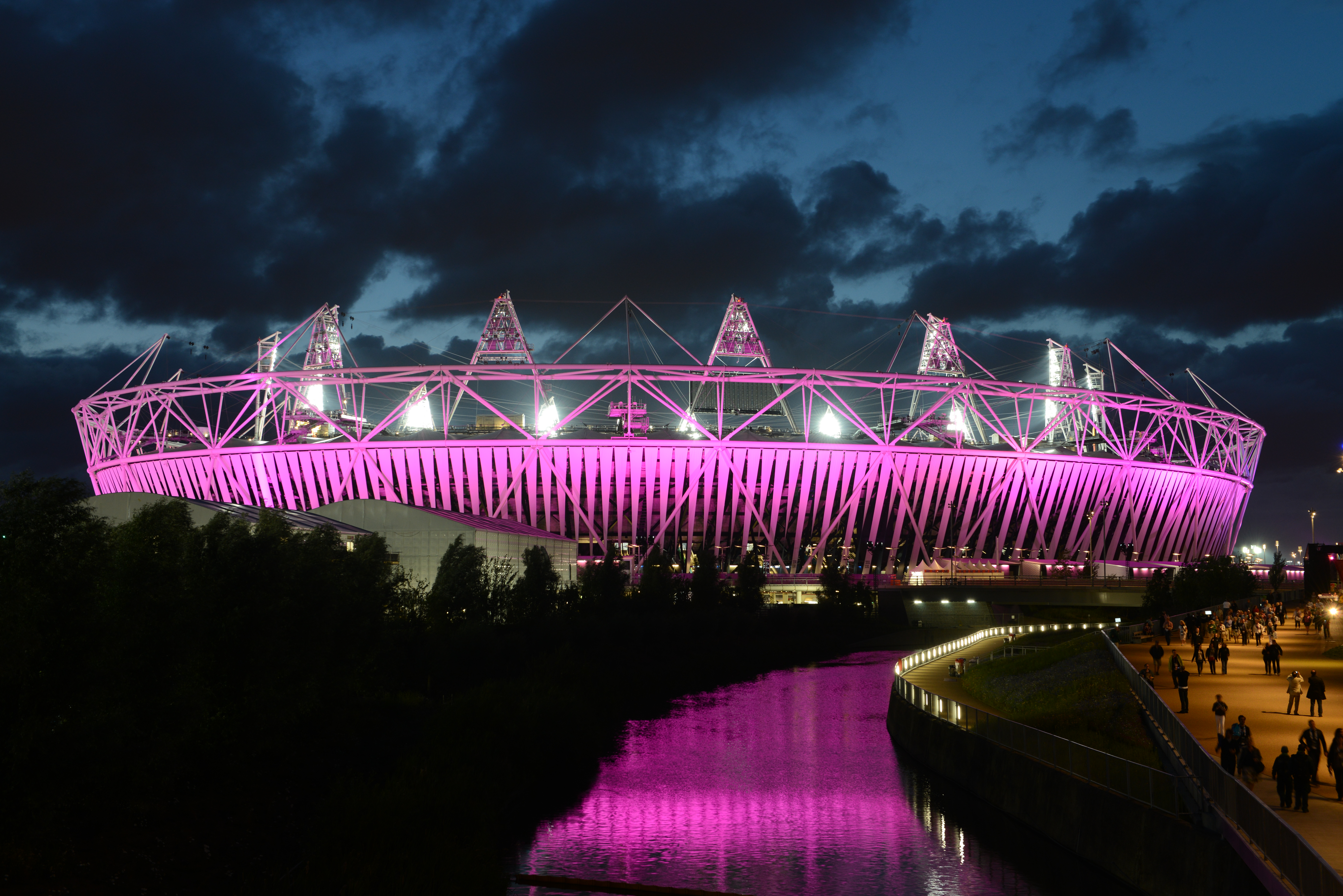
The London Olympic Stadium, where Enzema and Olama competed in track and field events

Competing at her first Olympic Games, Bibiana Olama was the oldest athlete to represent Equatorial Guinea in London at the age of 29. She qualified for the London Olympics because her fastest time of 15.95 seconds, set at the 2010 African Championships in Athletics, was 2.85 seconds slower than the "B" qualifying standard for the women's 100 metres hurdles. Olama competed in the event's sixth (and final) heat on 6 August, finishing ninth (and last) out of all runners, with a time of 16.18 seconds. Her time was her fastest of the 2012 athletic season. Olama finished 46th (and last) out of all athletes, (Note: Two competitors did not start, and two more were disqualified.) and did not advance to the semi-finals because her time was 3.18 seconds slower than the slowest runner in her heat who progressed to the later rounds.

Men

| Athlete | Event | Heat | | Semifinal | | Final | |
| Athlete | Event | Result | Rank | Result | Rank | Result | Rank |
|---|---|---|---|---|---|---|---|
| Benjamín Enzema | 800 m | 1:57.47 | 7 | Did not advance | | | |

Women

| Athlete | Event | Heat | | Semifinal | | Final | |
| Athlete | Event | Result | Rank | Result | Rank | Result | Rank |
|---|---|---|---|---|---|---|---|
| Bibiana Olama | 100 m hurdles | 16.18 SB | 9 | Did not advance | | | |

Key

- Note–Ranks given for track events are within the athlete's heat only
