= Equatorial Guinea at the 2022 World Aquatics Championships =

- Flag of Equatorial Guinea
- FINA code: GEQ
- National federation: Equatorial Guinean Swimming Federation

in Budapest, Hungary
- Competitors: 3 in 1 sport
- Medals: Gold 0 Silver 0 Bronze 0 Total 0

World Aquatics Championships appearances
- 2019; 2022; 2023; 2024

Equatorial Guinea competed at the 2022 World Aquatics Championships in Budapest, Hungary from 18 June to 3 July.

== Swimming ==
Athlete	Event	Heat		Semifinal		Final	
Athlete	Event	Time	Rank	Time	Rank	Time	Rank
Diosdado Miko Eyanga	Men's 100 m freestyle	1:10.26	98	did not advance			
Diosdado Miko Eyanga	Men's 50 m butterfly	DNS					
Higinio Ndong Obama	Men's 50 m freestyle	29.48	89	did not advance			
Higinio Ndong Obama	Men's 50 m breaststroke	DSQ		did not advance			
Rita Acaba Ocomo	Women's 50 m freestyle	43.27	82	did not advance			
Rita Acaba Ocomo	Women's 50 m breaststroke	DSQ		did not advance			
