= Equatorial Guinea at the 2016 Summer Olympics =

- IOC code: GEQ
- NOC: Olympic Committee of Equatorial Guinea

in Rio de Janeiro
- Competitors: 2 in 1 sport
- Flag bearer: Reïna-Flor Okori
- Medals: Gold 0 Silver 0 Bronze 0 Total 0

Summer Olympics appearances (overview)
- 1984; 1988; 1992; 1996; 2000; 2004; 2008; 2012; 2016; 2020; 2024

Equatorial Guinea competed at the 2016 Summer Olympics in Rio de Janeiro, Brazil, which was held from 5 to 21 August 2016. The country's participation at Rio marked its ninth appearance in the Summer Olympics since its début in the 1984 Summer Olympics. The delegation included two track and field athletes, Benjamin Enzema and Reïna-Flor Okori who both qualified for the Games through wildcard places since their fastest times did not meet the required qualification standards, Okori was selected as the flag bearer for the opening and closing ceremonies. Enzema did not advance beyond the qualification round for the men's 800 metres event and Okori was unable to start the women's 100 metre hurdles contest.

== Background ==
Equatorial Guinea participated in nine Summer Games between its début at the 1984 Summer Olympics in Los Angeles, and the 2016 Summer Olympics in Rio de Janeiro. No Equatoguinean athlete has ever won a medal at the Olympic Games. Equatorial Guinea participated in the Rio Summer Games from 5 to 21 August 2016.

The two athletes that were selected to compete in the Rio Games were athletics competitors Benjamín Enzema and Reïna-Flor Okori. Equatorial Guinea was one of several countries who sent a delegation of two athletes in 2016, with only Tuvalu sending a single competitor. Meanwhile, the number of competitors of Equatoguinean descent representing other nations was even higher than the Equatoguinean itself – they were three, all of them with Spain: judoka María Bernabéu, handball player Marta Mangué and athlete Aauri Bokesa.

Along with the two athletes, the country's delegation was led by the vice-president of Equatorial Guinea Teodoro Nguema Obiang Mangue. The country's Olympic women's football team failed to qualify for the Games following a defeat to South Africa on aggregate in a two-leg playoff match in October 2015. Okori was selected as the flag bearer for both the opening and closing ceremonies.

== Athletics (track and field) ==
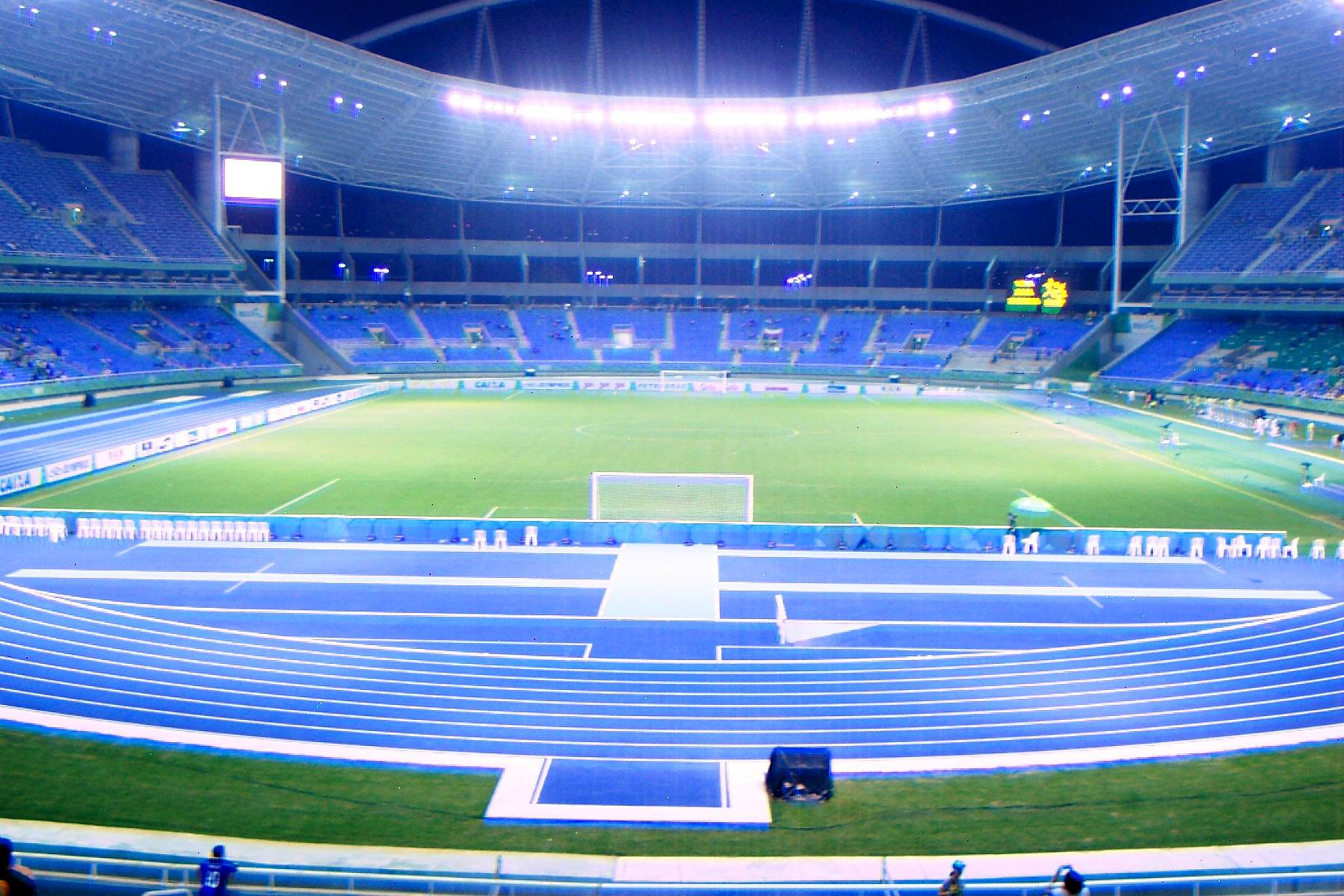
The Estádio Olímpico Nilton Santos, where Enzema competed in track and field events.

Benjamin Enzema was the sole male athlete representing Equatorial Guinea at the Rio Games at age 27. He had previously competed at the 2012 Summer Games. Enzema qualified for the Games via a wildcard as his fastest time of 1 minute, 53.35 seconds, set at the 2015 African Games, was 7.55 seconds slower than the qualifying standard for his event, the men's 800 metres. He was drawn in the third heat on 12 August, finishing eighth out of nine athletes, with a time of 1 minute, 52.14 seconds. Overall, Enzema finished 50th out of 54 runners, (Note: Two other athletes were disqualified, one did not finish and one was unable to start.) and was unable to advance to the later rounds because he finished 7.15 seconds slower than the slowest competitor in his heat who progressed to the second round.

Reïna-Flor Okori, at age 36, was the only Equatoguinean female competitor. She had previously competed at the previous three Summer Games but with the French Olympic team. She was notable for being the flag bearer for the opening and closing ceremonies. Okori qualified for the Games via a wildcard because she had not recorded a qualifying standard time for her event, the women's 100 metre hurdles. She spent time training in Equatorial Guinea and France preparing for the Games. In an interview before the Games Okori said she aimed to reach the final stage of her event and earn Equatorial Guinea's first Olympic gold medal. She was due to compete in the contest's sixth heat on 16 August alongside seven other participants but was unable to start the event because of a ruptured popliteal cyst.

Key

- Note–Ranks given for track events are within the athlete's heat only

Track & road events

Athlete	Event	Heat		Semifinal		Final	
Athlete	Event	Result	Rank	Result	Rank	Result	Rank
Benjamín Enzema	Men's 800 m	1:52.14	8	Did not advance			
Reïna-Flor Okori	Women's 100 m hurdles	DNS		Did not advance			
