= Equatorial Guinea at the 1984 Summer Olympics =

- IOC code: GEQ
- NOC: Olympic Committee of Equatorial Guinea

in Los Angeles
- Competitors: 4 in 1 sport
- Flag bearer: Secundino Borabota
- Medals: Gold 0 Silver 0 Bronze 0 Total 0

Summer Olympics appearances (overview)
- 1984; 1988; 1992; 1996; 2000; 2004; 2008; 2012; 2016; 2020; 2024

Equatorial Guinea competed at the 1984 Summer Olympics in Los Angeles, United States, which were held from 28 July to 12 August. This was the first time the country took part in a Summer Olympics. The delegation consisted of four athletics competitors: sprinters Gustavo Envela and Secundino Borabota, and middle-distance runners Bartolomé Esono Asumu and Diosdado Lozano. All four failed to advance beyond the initial heats in their respective competitions. The best performance came from Envela who placed fifth in the eighth heat of the men's 100 metres.

== Background ==
The Equatoguinean Olympic Committee was formed in 1980 and recognized by the International Olympic Committee (IOC) on 1 January 1984. The 1984 Los Angeles Summer Games were the first Olympics, Summer or Winter, Equatorial Guinea ever participated in after it accepted a formal invitation from the Los Angeles Olympic Organizing Committee. As of the 2018 Winter Olympics in PyeongChang, the country has yet to debut in the Winter Olympics. Equatorial Guinea took part in the 1984 Summer Olympics from 28 July to 12 August. The Equatoguinean delegation to Los Angeles consisted of a group of four athletics competitors: sprinters Gustavo Envela and Secundino Borabota, and middle-distance runners Bartolomé Esono Asumu and Diosdado Lozano. The team was funded by a subsidy from the IOC. Borabota was chosen to be the flag bearer for the opening ceremony.

== Athletics (track and field) ==
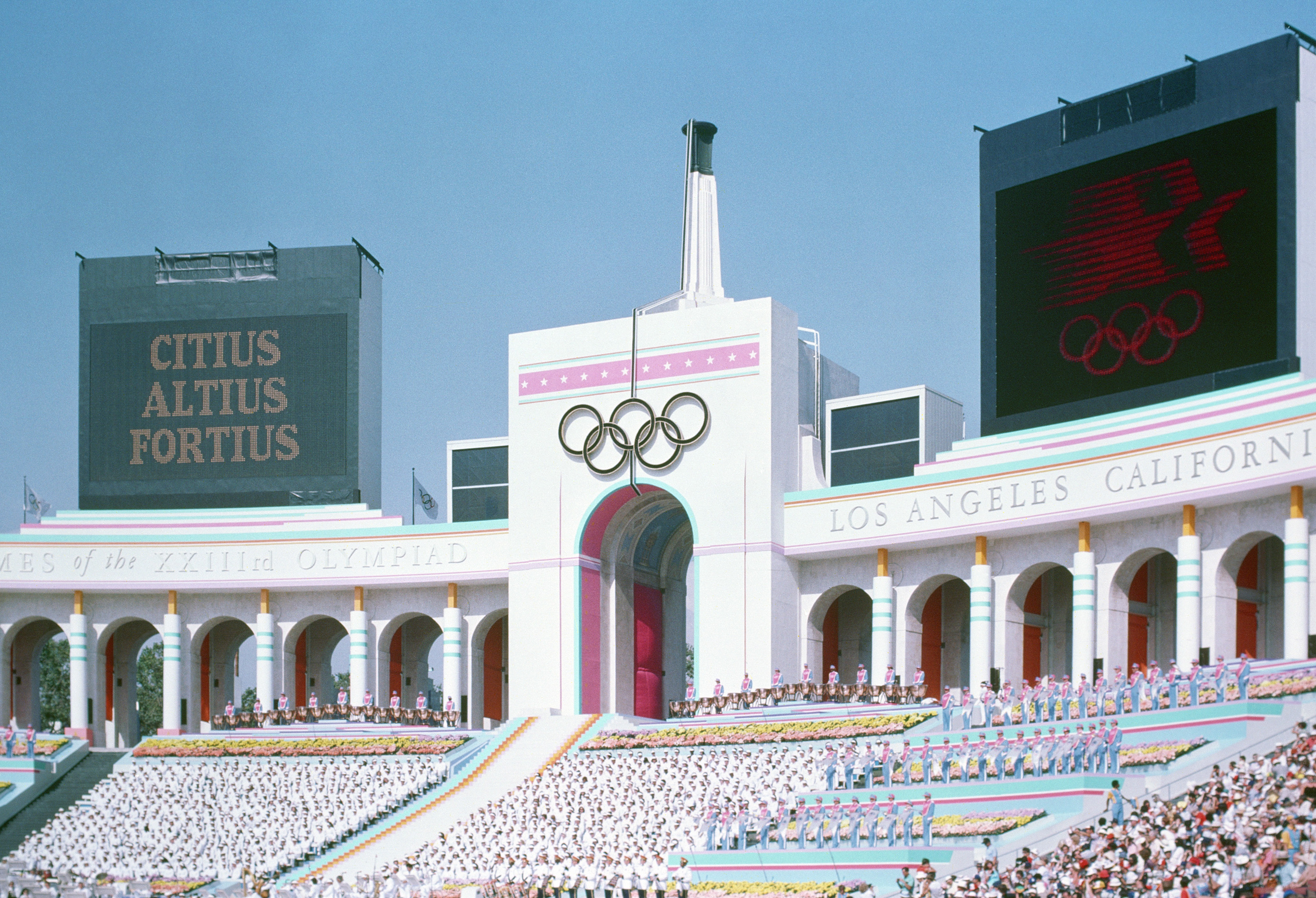
The Los Angeles Memorial Coliseum, where the Equatoguinean delegation competed in athletics competitions.

At the age of 16, Gustavo Envela was the youngest person to represent Equatorial Guinea at the Los Angeles Games. He was drawn to compete in the eighth heat of the first round in the men's 100 metres on 3 August. Envela placed fifth out of eight sprinters with a time of 10.79 seconds. Since the top three in a heat, plus the next six overall fastest athletes progressed to the second round, that was the end of his participation in the men's 100 metres. Three days later, Envela took part in the first round of the men's 200 metres and was assigned heat eight along with seven other runners. He finished this race in a time of 22.14 seconds, which was seventh out of eight competitors. This was not sufficient for Envela to advance to the second round. Envela would go on to compete for Equatorial Guinea in the next three Summer Olympics and became a political activist after retiring.

23 year old Secundino Borabota was the oldest athlete to compete for Equatorial Guinea at the 1984 Los Angeles Summer Olympics. On 4 August, he took part in the first round of the men's 400 metres. Assigned to the third heat and starting from lane two, Borabota, unfamiliar with the rule that all runners had to stay in their lane during the sprint and hurdle races, was observed cutting off Innocent Egbunike of Nigeria on the first turn. While running, Egbunike yelled at Borabota for 100 m (330 ft) before he got by him on the inside line and won the heat. Egbunike subsequently called for officials to disqualify Borabota, which they did. Afterwards, Borabota explained he switched lanes inadvertently because of an injury he sustained and remarked, "Lane one is a good lane." Nevertheless, Borabota represented Equatorial Guinea at the 1988 Summer Olympics.

Bartolomé Esono Asumu was 21 years old at the time of the 1984 Games and was competing in his first Summer Olympics. His only race was the men's 800 metres, which he took part in the first round on 3 August. Asumu finished seventh and last in the seventh heat in a time of two minutes and 17.29 seconds. As the top three from each heat plus the next five fastest from all nine heats advanced to the second round, he was eliminated as his qualifying time was the slowest overall.

Diosdado Lozano was 20 years old at the time of these Summer Games and was making his Olympic debut. His only event was the men's 1500 metres, and on 9 August he was assigned to run in the second round's sixth heat. The top three in a heat, plus the next five overall fastest athletes advanced to the quarterfinals. Lozano finished his heat in a time of four minutes and 34.71 seconds and was eliminated from further contention as it placed him tenth and last of all the finishing runners.

Key

- Note – Ranks given for track events are within the athlete's heat only
- N/A = Round not applicable for the event

Track and road events

| Athletes | Events | Round 1 | | Round 2 | | Semifinal | | Final | |
| Athletes | Events | Time | Rank | Time | Rank | Time | Rank | Time | Rank |
|---|---|---|---|---|---|---|---|---|---|
| Gustavo Envela | 100 metres | 10.79 | 5 | did not advance | | | | | |
| Gustavo Envela | 200 metres | 22.14 | 7 | did not advance | | | | | |
| Secundino Borabota | 400 metres | DSQ | | did not advance | | | | | |
| Bartolomé Esono Asumu | 800 metres | 2:17.29 | 7 | did not advance | | | | | |
| Diosdado Lozano | 1500 metres | N/A | | 4:34.71 | 10 | did not advance | | | |
