= Esono =

Esono is a Fang masculine name. Notable people with the name include:

- Bartolomé Esono Asumu (born 1963), Equatoguinean middle-distance runner
- Ivan Zarandona Esono
- Juan Simeón Esono (born 1983) Equatoguinean former footballer
- Justice Esono (born 1986), Equatoguinean footballer
- Ramón Esono Ebalé (born 1977), Equatoguinean illustrator and comic artist
