= Equatorial Guinea at the 2019 World Aquatics Championships =

- Flag of Equatorial Guinea
- FINA code: GEQ
- National federation: Federación Ecuatoguineana de Natación

in Gwangju, South Korea
- Competitors: 3 in 1 sport
- Medals: Gold 0 Silver 0 Bronze 0 Total 0

World Aquatics Championships appearances
- 2019; 2022; 2023; 2024

Equatorial Guinea competed at the 2019 World Aquatics Championships in Gwangju, South Korea from 12 to 28 July 2019.

== Swimming ==
Equatorial Guinea entered three swimmers.

Men

Athlete	Event	Heat		Semifinal		Final	
Athlete	Event	Time	Rank	Time	Rank	Time	Rank
Diosdado Miko Eyanga	50 m freestyle	31.78	130	did not advance			

Women

Athlete	Event	Heat		Semifinal		Final	
Athlete	Event	Time	Rank	Time	Rank	Time	Rank
Juanita Ndong Eyenga	50 m freestyle	DSQ		did not advance			
Pilar Ndong Mangue	50 m breaststroke	49.32	54	did not advance			
