= Equatorial Guinea at the 2024 World Aquatics Championships =

- Flag of Equatorial Guinea
- FINA code: GEQ
- National federation: Equatorial Guinean Swimming Federation

World Aquatics Championships appearances
- 2019; 2022; 2023; 2024

Equatorial Guinea competed at the 2024 World Aquatics Championships in Doha, Qatar from 2 to 18 February.

== Competitors ==
The following is the list of competitors in the Championships.

Sport	Men	Women	Total
Swimming	1	1	2
Total	1	1	2

== Swimming ==
Equatorial Guinea entered 2 swimmers.

Men

Athlete	Event	Heat		Semifinal		Final	
Athlete	Event	Time	Rank	Time	Rank	Time	Rank
Higinio Ndong Obama	50 metre freestyle	Did not start		Did not advance			
Higinio Ndong Obama	50 metre breaststroke	Did not start		Did not advance			

Women

Athlete	Event	Heat		Semifinal		Final	
Athlete	Event	Time	Rank	Time	Rank	Time	Rank
Rita Acaba Ocomo	50 metre freestyle	Did not start		Did not advance			
Rita Acaba Ocomo	50 metre breaststroke	Did not start		Did not advance			
