= Equatoguinean Americans =

Americans of Equatoguinean birth or descent

Total population
- Less than 300

Languages
- American English, Spanish, Fang, Bube (and other local languages), French, Portuguese

Religion
- Predominantly Roman Catholic, minority Islam

Equatoguinean Americans (Spanish: ecuatoguineo-estadounidenses, estadounidenses de origen ecuatoguineano) are Americans of Equatoguinean descent.

== Demographics ==
Equatoguineans are a small minority in the United States, with less than 300 individuals in 2000.

== Notable people ==
- Bisila Bokoko
- Gus Envela, Jr.
- Gustavo Envela-Makongo, Sr.
- Andrés Malango
- Donato Malango
- Roberto Mandje

== See also ==
- Equatorial Guinea–United States relations
