= FEA =

FEA or Fea may refer to:

== Organizations ==
- Far Eastern Air Transport (ICAO code), a Taiwanese airline
- Fellow of the English Association, a post-nominal from the English Association

=== Education ===
- Fellow of the English Association
- Florida Education Association, in the United States
- Future Educators Association, former name of Educators Rising, US
- School of Economics, Business and Accounting of the University of São Paulo (Portuguese: Faculdade de Economia, Administração e Contabilidade da Universidade de São Paulo, FEA-USP)

=== Sport ===
- Athletics Federation of Equatorial Guinea (Spanish: Federación Ecuatoguineana de Atletismo)
- Ecuadorian Athletics Federation (Spanish: Federación Ecuatoriana de Atletismo)

== Government ==
- Executive Order 8802, also known as the Fair Employment Act, in the US
- Federal Energy Administration, of the US government
- Federal enterprise architecture, the US reference enterprise architecture of a federal government
- Foreign Economic Administration, a US federal agency active during World War II

== People ==
- Carlo Fea (1753–1836), Italian archaeologist
- Leonardo Fea (1852–1903), Italian naturalist
- William Fea (1898–1988), New Zealand rugby union player

== Science and technology ==
- FEA (cable system), a telecommunications cable
- Field emitter array, a particular form of large-area field electron source
- Finite element analysis, a method for solving problems of engineering and mathematical models
- 2-Furylethylamine, a drug related to phenethylamine

== Other uses ==
- Featherstone railway station, in England
- Fire Emblem Awakening, a video game
- French Equatorial Africa, 1910–1958 federation of French colonial possessions
- Fea, in Irish mythology; see Nemain § Kinship
