= Cameroonian Americans =

Americans of Cameroonian birth or descent

Total population
- 16,894 (Cameroonian ancestry or ethnic origin, 2010); 90,749 (Cameroonian-born, 2023)

Regions with significant populations
- Found in Pennsylvania, New York, Chicago, Maryland, Houston, Atlanta, California

Languages
- American English; Cameroonian English; Cameroonian French

Religion
- Odinani, Islam, Christianity and Practitioners of traditional religion of Cameroon.

Related ethnic groups
- Cameroonian people, Nigerian Americans, Congolese Americans, Gabonese Americans, Equatoguinean Americans, African Americans

Cameroonian American (French: Camerouno-Américains) are an ethnic group of Americans of Cameroonian descent. According to the 2010 census, in the United States there were 16,894 Americans of Cameroonian origin. According to the 2023 American Community Survey there are 90,749 Cameroonian-born people living in the United States.

== History ==
The first peoples from the modern Cameroon area to arrive in the United States were enslaved by the British and sold into the British colonies, during the colonial period, as DNA testing suggests. The first documented "enslaved" African, in what was to become the US, probably originated from modern day Cameroon and was imported into the colonial United States to serve as a slave John Punch. Punch arrived in Virginia in about 1640. He is also considered, by some genealogists and historians, to be the first African documented to be enslaved for life in what would eventually become the United States.

According to DNA testing records, the ethnicities of the Cameroonian slaves in the modern United States were those of Tikar, Igbo, Ewondo, Babungo, Bamileke, Bamum, Masa, Mafa, Udemes, Kotoko, Fulani and Hausa from Cameroon; however, many Hausa also came from other places, such as Nigeria. In what is referred to as "the whole of the Americas", we find that the majority of captured Africans, sold to the European slave merchants on the Cameroon coast, came from inland places; where they were captured by other ethnic groups, through the invasions of these zones, and sold to the Europeans. They came from the Batagan, Bassa, and Bulu peoples. So, most of the slaves carried from Bimbia in those years, were from Tikari, Douala-Bimbia, Banyangi and Bakossi. Most of them were Bamileke (who accounted for 62 percent of the people).

Douala was the main location of the trade in slaves, but most of the slaves of modern Cameroon who were delivered to Europeans, regardless of their specific origin, were sold to the Fernando Po slave trade center, and from there the European merchants took them to the Americas.

Most of the slaves regarded as Cameroonian were from the Bight of Biafra, which included the countries of Nigeria (eastern coast), Cameroon, Equatorial Guinea (Bioko Island and Rio Muni), and Gabon (northern coast) "with many of them hailing from the Cameroon itself". These African "captures" arrived in what would be the United States and were sold in Virginia, which had 60% of the slaves of the eastern region of the future United States. 34% of the Africans arriving in Virginia came from the Bight of Biafra. Virginia and surrounding colonies held 30,000 slaves hailing from the Bight. Normally, the slaves from Cameroon were bought cheap, because they preferred to die rather than accept slavery. However, many captured Cameroonians were sold up the river to areas like Sierra Leona and Angola, where they were forcibly shipped to the United States.

The first Cameroonians who voluntarily arrived in the US immigrated to this country in the 1960s, pursuing educational opportunities which were lacking in their own country. During the 1990s many other Cameroonians immigrated as political refugees, fleeing political turmoil. To avoid imprisonment, torture and political repression, many citizens decided to emigrate.

Most Cameroonian immigrants who arrived in the United States were licensed professionals since they were the ones most likely to obtain visas. It is easier for licensed professionals to obtain visas than any other group in Cameroon. Many of them had criticized the government, making them more vulnerable to political repression. Thus, the majority of Cameroonians who settled permanently in the United States were doctors, engineers, nurses, pharmacists, and computer programmers. There are also many Cameroonians who are blue collar workers.

== Demographics ==
According to the census of 2010, in the United States there 16,894 known Americans of Cameroonian origin. In addition, according to the 2007–2011 American Community Survey there are 33,181 Cameroonian-born living in the United States. The Cameroonian immigrants have communities in places such as Ohio, New York City, San Diego, Illinois, Houston (Texas) and Pittsburgh (Pennsylvania). The Cameroonian community of Pittsburgh is considered to be one of the better organized African communities in the city. The largest Cameroonian-American community exists in Maryland, particularly in Prince George's County and Montgomery County.

According to 2015–2019 estimates from the American Community Survey via the Migration Policy Institute website, the total number of Cameroonian immigrants in the USA is 60,100. The top counties of settlement for which more than 1,000 are present were as follows:

1) Prince George's County, MD --------------- 8,600

2) Montgomery County, MD ------------------- 5,400

3) Harris County, TX ------------------------------- 3,300

4) Franklin County, OH ----------------------------- 1,800

5) Los Angeles County, CA --------------------- 1,700

6) Dallas County, TX ------------------------------- 1,500

7) Tarrant County, TX --------------------------- 1,100

8) Collin County, TX -------------------------------- 1,100

9) Baltimore County, MD ------------------------ 1,100

== Activism ==
Cameroonians have been active in activism movements in the United States. One notable example is the set of political movements in favor of Cameroon, developed in Chicago. In 1991, Cameroonians from that city were held in the outside wing of the Social Democratic Front from Cameroon in support of political pluralism. After his success in Chicago, the SDF party eventually established several subsidiaries in other US cities. The group managed to raise funds to support the political movement in Cameroon. It lobbied the US Senate and United Nations to stop the advance of the sale of weapons to the government of Cameroon, i.e. to prevent the sale of arms from continuing exerting between this government and the US government. Soon after, another group of Cameroonians of Chicago, mainly francophone, organized a wing of the Cameroon People's Democratic Movement, driving their own campaign to support the government of Cameroon.

== Organizations ==
There are many Cameroonian organizations in the US. Among these is the American Association of Cameroonians (Amacam). It promotes friendship between the Cameroonians and develop of appropriate measures to improve their rights, developing the potential of Cameroonians in US and in Cameroon in all areas of the economic, cultural, social, academic, or help to the US.

Another organization is CAMSOLA, an organization, located in Southern California, which recognizes those Cameroonians and Cameroonian-American individuals, groups or businesses that have influenced in the Cameroonian immigrant community and the general populace in Southern California.

The organization teaches aspects of life in Cameroon and connects Cameroonian-Americans living in California with Cameroon. Furthermore, CAMSOLA premiered in 2011 the Scholarship Fund Youth Development and Youth Leadership Club in Los Angeles. While most of the organization's members are native Cameroonians, the club has also tried to assist African Americans who trace some of their origins to Cameroon.

Cameroon Group USA (CAMGUSA) is an organization form by members of the various cultural groups in Los Angeles. The association tries, among other things, relate and encourage respect among all Cameroonians living in the metropolitan area of Los Angeles and California, teaches them to respect the laws of the State and the United States of America, helps individuals and families need, helps communities, government agencies, social groups and various associations in the United States and other countries, working with them to improve the lives of Cameroon in particular and humanity in general and participate in charitable activities of other organizations.

The organization Cameroon American Community of Houston (CAMCOH), established in Houston, Texas, have as goal, among other things, encourages the creation of Sustainable Networks and Communication among the Cameroonians in the city, propels to Cameroonian immigrants to emigrate in Houston by the Guidance and Council, empowers youth through Programs for Children and Youth Educational Activities, defends the needs of Cameroonians in Houston and creates and manages the Community Center.

The Association of Cameroonians, founded in Illinois, is an association aimed to help and lend assistance to Cameroonians in the state, regardless of their political leanings. Moreover, the association also represents the Cameroonians in the government of Chicago, the largest city in the state. The community also commemorates annual celebrations, including Cameroonian Independence Day, celebrated on May 20.

The Cameroonian Community in Pittsburgh (CCP) teaches and promotes the culture, customs and values of Cameroon, especially for non-Cameroonians. It does this through solidarity and tradition. The organization also promotes educational opportunities, employment, business and training for Cameroonians.

== Notable people ==
- Anthony Anderson, American actor, comedian, writer, and game show host
- Erykah Badu, American singer-songwriter, record producer and actress
- Don Cheadle, American actor, author, director, producer and writer
- Ebro Darden, American media executive and radio personality
- Taraji P. Henson, American actress and art collector
- Quincy Jones, American music producer
- Spike Lee, American film director, producer, screenwriter, actor, and professor
- Flying Lotus, American hip hop producer
- Imbolo Mbue, Cameroonian-born American novelist and short-story writer
- Patrice Nganang, Cameroonian-born American writer, poet and teacher
- Papoose, American rapper
- Sheryl Lee Ralph, American actress, singer, author, and activist
- Condoleezza Rice, American diplomat, political scientist, civil servant, and professor who served as the 66th United States Secretary of State
- Tasha Smith, American actress, director and producer
- Wanda Sykes, American stand-up comedian, actress, and writer
- Blair Underwood, American actor
- Jessica Williams, American actress and comedian
- Vanessa A Williams, American actress and producer
- Oprah Winfrey, American talk show host, television producer, actress, author, and media proprietor

== See also ==
- Cameroon–United States relations
