= Evuna Andeme =

Evuna Andeme is a surname. Notable people with the surname include:

- Mari-Cruz Evuna Andeme, Equatoguinean ambassador to the United Kingdom from 2012, sister of Miguel Ntutumu
- Miguel Ntutumu Evuna Andeme, Equatoguinean ambassador to the United States from 2015, brother of Mari-Cruz
