= Equatorial Guinea at the Olympics =

- IOC code: GEQ
- NOC: Olympic Committee of Equatorial Guinea
- Medals: Gold 0 Silver 0 Bronze 0 Total 0

Summer appearances
- 1984; 1988; 1992; 1996; 2000; 2004; 2008; 2012; 2016; 2020; 2024

Equatorial Guinea first participated at the Olympic Games in 1984, and has sent athletes to compete in every Summer Olympic Games since then. The nation has never participated in the Winter Olympic Games.

As of 2024, no athlete from Equatorial Guinea has ever won an Olympic medal. The nation's most famous Olympic athlete is Eric Moussambani, who achieved some international notoriety for his exceptionally slow performance in swimming at the 2000 Summer Olympics.

The National Olympic Committee for Equatorial Guinea was created in 1980 and recognized by the International Olympic Committee in 1984.

== Medal tables ==
=== Medals by Summer Games ===
Games	Athletes	Gold	Silver	Bronze	Total	Rank
1984 Los Angeles	4	0	0	0	0	–
1988 Seoul	6	0	0	0	0	–
1992 Barcelona	7	0	0	0	0	–
1996 Atlanta	5	0	0	0	0	–
2000 Sydney	4	0	0	0	0	–
2004 Athens	2	0	0	0	0	–
2008 Beijing	3	0	0	0	0	–
2012 London	2	0	0	0	0	–
2016 Rio de Janeiro	2	0	0	0	0	–
2020 Tokyo	3	0	0	0	0	–
2024 Paris	3	0	0	0	0	–
2028 Los Angeles	future event					
2032 Brisbane	future event					
Total		0	0	0	0	–

== See also ==
- List of flag bearers for Equatorial Guinea at the Olympics
- Category:Olympic competitors for Equatorial Guinea
