= Coat of arms of Equatorial Guinea =

- Armiger: Republic of Equatorial Guinea
- Adopted: 21 August 1979
- Crest: Six gold six-pointed stars, which represent the mainland and the islands
- Torse: None
- Shield: Argent, a Silk cotton tree proper
- Supporters: None
- Compartment: None
- Motto: Unidad, Paz, Justicia (Spanish: "Unity, Peace, Justice")
- Order: None

The national coat of arms of Equatorial Guinea (Escudo de Guinea Ecuatorial; Armoiries de la Guinée équatoriale; Brasão de armas da Guiné Equatorial) was adopted on 21 August 1979.

This coat of arms shows a grey shield, which contains a silk cotton tree. This represents the location where the first treaty was signed between Portugal and the local ruler. Over the shield, there is 6 six-pointed stars, representing the mainland and the five main islands.

== Motto ==
Underneath the shield is the national motto of Equatorial Guinea, Unidad, Paz, Justicia ("Unity, Peace, Justice"). The motto was adopted in 1968. During the dictatorship of Francisco Nguema (1972–79) the arms and motto were changed, a combination of different tools and swords with a cock overall, and motto on two stripes, in the middle of the arms Trabajo (work), and below Unidad, Paz, Justicia, but the original 1968 coat of arms' motto was restored afterward.

== Historical coats of arms ==
Coat of arms of the Portuguese Gulf of Guinea Territories, then Spanish Guinea, now Equatorial Guinea

Coat of arms of the Spanish Río Muni colony

Coat of arms from 1978 to 1979

== See also ==
- Flag of Equatorial Guinea
