= Casimiro Asumu Nze =

Equatoguinean sprinter

Personal information
- Nationality: Equatoguinean
- Born: 4 March 1975 (age 51)

Sport
- Sport: Sprinting
- Event: 400 metres

Casimiro Asumu Nze (born 4 March 1975) is an Equatoguinean sprinter. He competed in the men's 400 metres at the 1996 Summer Olympics.
