= Bonifacio Edu =

Equatoguinean sprinter

Bonifacio Edu Ndong (born 3 June 1969) is a former Equatoguinean sprinter who competed in the men's 100m competition at the 1996 Summer Olympics. He recorded an 11.87, not enough to qualify for the next round past the heats. He also ran for the Equatoguinean 4 × 100 m relay team, which finished 5th in its heat with a time of 45.63.
