= Bibiana Olama =

Equatoguinean athlete (born 1982)

Bibiana Martina Olama
Personal information
- Full name: Bibiana Martina Olama Mangue
- Born: 2 December 1982 (age 43) Equatorial Guinea

Bibiana Martina Olama Mangue (born 2 December 1982) is an Equatorial Guinean former athlete. She competed at the 2012 Summer Olympics in the 100 metres hurdles event. She was flag bearer for the Equatorial Guinea team. She also competed in heptathlons.

Olympic Games
Preceded by Emilia Mikue Ondo	Flagbearer for Equatorial Guinea; London 2012	Succeeded by Reïna-Flor Okori
