= Gustavo Envela-Makongo Sr. =

Equatoguinean diplomat

Gustavo B. Envela-Makongo Sr.
- Born: June 26, 1926; Bolondo, Spanish Guinea
- Died: July 25, 2005 (aged 79); Salem, Oregon, U.S.
- Occupation: Diplomat
- Known for: First Ambassador of Equatorial Guinea to the United Nations
- Office: Ambassador of Equatorial Guinea to the United Nations
- Predecessor: Position established
- Children: Gus Envela Jr. and others

Rev. Gustavo B. Envela-Makongo Sr. (June 26, 1926 – July 25, 2005) was Equatorial Guinea's first ambassador to the United Nations. He resigned in 1970 due to dissent with government policy on free speech and human rights. With escalating political unrest Envela and his family fled into exile in the United States and settled in Salem, Oregon.

Envela worked for the State of Oregon and helped raise his daughter and five sons.

In the year 2000, one of his sons, Stanford University alumnus Gus Envela Jr., announced that he would run for president of Equatorial Guinea.

Envela was born in Bolondo, Spanish Guinea on June 26, 1926. He died in Salem, Oregon on July 25, 2005, at the age of 79.
