= Gabonese Americans =

Americans of Gabonese birth or descent

Américains gabonais (French)

Total population
- Less than 600

Regions with significant populations
- New York; Massachusetts; Pennsylvania; Delaware; Maryland; Georgia; Florida; Kentucky; Minnesota; Louisiana; Oklahoma; Texas; Washington; Colorado; California

Languages
- French; English

Religion
- Christianity; Islam; Bwiti; Animism

Related ethnic groups
- African Americans

Gabonese Americans are Americans of Gabonese descent.

== U.S.-Gabon Relations ==
The United States established diplomatic relations with Gabon in 1960 following Gabon’s independence from France. Relations between the United States and Gabon are excellent. The United States applauds Gabon’s efforts to take bold steps to root out corruption and to reform the judiciary and other key institutions to promote respect for human rights. Gabon and the United States are working to diversify and strengthen Gabon’s economy, expand bilateral trade, increase security in the Gulf of Guinea, and combat wildlife trafficking.

Bilateral Economic Relations Gabon’s oil-reliant economy shows signs of recovering from its downturn due to COVID-19 and the decline in oil prices and demand. Gabon’s middle-income status limits the amount of U.S. assistance available. The government is focused on economic diversification, most notably by expanding the agribusiness and tourism sectors. Most foreign investment, including U.S. investment, is concentrated in the oil and extractive sectors. Gabon is eligible for preferential trade benefits under the African Growth and Opportunity Act (AGOA). U.S. exports to Gabon include machinery, agricultural products, vehicles, and optical and medical instruments. U.S. imports from Gabon include crude oil, manganese ores, agricultural products, and wood. In Fiscal Year 2021, exports from the United States to Gabon totaled $77.3 million.

The majority of Gabonese immigrants to the United States, if not all, arrived for educational purposes. There are about 250 Gabonese students in American colleges and universities.

== Notable people ==
- Samuel L. Jackson, of Gabonese origin & dual Gabonese-American citizenship
- Christelle Avomo
- Aida Touré

== See also ==
- Gabon–United States relations
- Gabonese French
