= Manuel Rondo =

Equatoguinean long-distance runner

Personal information
- Full name: Manuel Rondo Roku
- Nationality: Equatoguinean
- Born: 25 May 1967 (age 59)

Sport
- Sport: Long-distance running
- Event: 5000 metres

Manuel Rondo Roku (born 25 May 1967) is an Equatoguinean long-distance runner. He competed in the men's 5000 metres at the 1988 Summer Olympics.

Olympic Games
Preceded by Secundino Borabota	Flagbearer for Equatorial Guinea; Seoul 1988	Succeeded by Ruth Mangue
