= Aïda Touré =

Gabonese artist, Sufi poet, painter, and composer

Aïda Touré is a Gabonese artist, Sufi poet, painter, and composer.

== Biography ==
Touré was born in Gabon to a Gabonese mother and a Malian father, who was also Muslim. She later attended high school in France, where she generated a distinct interest across the arts. In 1995, she moved to New York City to study music. During this creative journey, she felt pulled toward the practice of Islam which was to have a profound impact on the nature of her creations. Sufism, the inner dimension of Islam, inspired her to produce poetic works of a spiritual nature.

She released her first collection of Sufi poetry entitled Unmanifest Poems in 2000. In 2001, she published The Sublime Sphere. This was followed up in 2003 by another collection of poems, Nocturnal Light. In 2005, Touré professed to be overcome with images of ineffable beauty. This prompted her to take up painting to convert the spirituality in her poems into a visual landscape of beauty. She has referred to this artwork as Visual Sufi Poetry.

Touré exhibited her artwork in many of the major cities throughout the United States and back in her native Gabon. She has appeared in magazines internationally. Most of her paintings are owned privately, mainly in the US, France, Gabon, and Mali.

In February 2015, Touré had her second exhibition in New York titled "Luminous Dark Matter" to celebrate Black History month

In 2017 she was selected by OkayAfrica as a woman to watch.

In 2018, she published a new poetry book titled "Cosmicity"

In September 2021 she launched her own NFT portfolio and started selling her artworks as NFTs
