= Secundino Borabota =

Equatoguinean sprinter

Personal information
- Full name: Secundino Borabota Epacua
- Nationality: Equatoguinean
- Born: 21 February 1961 (age 65)

Sport
- Sport: Sprinting
- Events: 100 metres, 200 metres, 400 metres

Secundino Borabota Epacua (born 21 February 1961) is an Equatoguinean sprinter. He would be part of the first delegation of Equatorial Guinea at the Olympics, after the nation had made its debut at the 1984 Summer Olympics. There, he was designated as the flagbearer for the nation at the Parade of Nations. He would compete in the men's 400 metres though would be disqualified in his round.

After the 1984 Summer Games, he would compete in the men's 200 metres at the 1987 World Championships in Athletics; he would not advance further. He made his second Olympic appearance at the 1988 Summer Olympics. Borabota competed in the men's 100 metres and placed last in his round; he did not advance further.

== Biography ==
Secundino Borabota Epacua was born on 21 February 1961. Equatorial Guinea would make their debut at the Olympic Games at the 1984 Summer Olympics in Los Angeles, United States. Borabota would be part of the delegation and was designated as the flagbearer for the nation at the 1984 Summer Olympics Parade of Nations during the opening ceremony.

Borabota would compete in the heats of the men's 400 metres on 4 August. He would compete in the third heat against seven other athletes, though he would eventually be disqualified and unranked. After the 1984 Summer Games, he would compete at the 1987 World Championships in Athletics in Rome, Italy. Borabota would compete in the heats of the men's 200 metres on 1 September. He would compete against six other people in his heat and recorded a time of 23.66 seconds, placing last. He would not advance further.

He would compete at his second games for the nation at the 1988 Summer Olympics in Seoul, South Korea. He competed in the heats of the men's 100 metres on 23 September. He would compete in the eleventh heat against seven other athletes. He would place last with a time of 11.52 seconds.

Olympic Games
Preceded by First	Flagbearer for Equatorial Guinea; Los Angeles 1984	Succeeded by Manuel Rondo
