= Juan Simeón Esono =

Equatoguinean footballer

Bohobo
Personal information
- Full name: Juan Simeón Esono
- Date of birth: 24 June 1983 (age 43)
- Place of birth: Malabo, Equatorial Guinea
- Position: Striker

Senior career*
Years	Team	Apps	(Gls)
2002–2008	CD Elá Nguema		
2009–2010	Deportivo Mongomo		

International career
2002–2009	Equatorial Guinea	5	(0)
2009	Equatorial Guinea B	2	(1)
- * Club domestic league appearances and goals

Juan Simeón Esono (born 24 June 1983) is an Equatoguinean former footballer who played as a striker. He is nicknamed Bohobo.

== Career ==
Bohobo began his career with CD Elá Nguema in 2002, before moving to Deportivo Mongomo in 2009.

=== International career ===
Bohobo earned five international caps for Equatorial Guinea between 2002 and 2009, including one FIFA World Cup qualifier.

Also, Boboho had two B matches against Liberia and Ivory Coast in 2009.

== Presumed death ==
On 19 December 2010, Polish media announced that Bohobo had died in a car crash in Cameroon, alongside his sister Teclaireille Bille, also a footballer. However, Equatoguinean media denied this information, and released a statement from the player Pierre Désiré Colday who said that "Bohobo is not the brother of Bille and he was not on the trip".
