= Athletics Federation of Equatorial Guinea =

Sports governing body in Equatorial Guinea

- Federación Ecuatoguineana de Atletismo
- Sport: Athletics
- Abbreviation: FEA
- Founded: 1979
- Affiliation: IAAF
- Affiliation date: 1986
- Regional affiliation: CAA
- Headquarters: Malabo
- President: Manuel Sabino Asumu Cawan
- Secretary: Jorge Manuel Borabota Upinda
- (Equatorial Guinea)

The Athletics Federation of Equatorial Guinea (Spanish: Federación Ecuatoguineana de Atletismo, FEA) is the governing body for the sport of athletics in Equatorial Guinea. Current president is Manuel Sabino Asumu Cawan.

== History ==
FEA was founded in 1979, and was affiliated to the IAAF in the year 1986.

== Affiliations ==
- International Association of Athletics Federations (IAAF)
- Confederation of African Athletics (CAA)
- Asociación Iberoamericana de Atletismo (AIA; Ibero-American Athletics Association)

Moreover, it is part of the following national organisations:

- Olympic Committee of Equatorial Guinea (COGE; Spanish: Comité Olímpico de Guinea Ecuatorial)

== National records ==
FEA maintains the national records.
