= Alba Mbo Nchama =

Equatoguinean sprinter (born 2003)

Personal information
- Nationality: Equatorial Guinea
- Born: Alba Rosana Mbo Nchama; 13 February 2003 (age 23) Malabo, Equatorial Guinea

Sport
- Sport: Track and Field
- Events: 100 metres, 200 metres

Alba Rosana Mbo Nchama (born 13 February 2003) is an Equatorial Guinean sprinter. A national champion, she represented her country at the 2020 Summer Olympics.

== Personal life ==
A two-time national champion, Nchama emulated her mother, who was also a national champion in the 100m and 200m.

== Career ==
Competing at the Athletics at the 2020 Summer Olympics – Women's 100 meters, she finished seventh in the first preliminary heat, running a time of 13.36, which was a new personal best.

Olympic Games
Preceded by Reïna-Flor Okori	Flag bearer for Equatorial Guinea; 2020 Tokyo with Benjamín Enzema	Succeeded by Sefora Ada Eto; Higinio Ndong Obama
