= José Mba Nchama =

Equatoguinean judoka

Personal information
- Nationality: Equatorial Guinea
- Born: 17 October 1965 (age 60)
- Weight: 81 kg (179 lb)

Sport
- Sport: Judo
- Event: 81 kg

José Mba Nchama (born October 17, 1965) is an Equatoguinean judoka, who played for the half-middleweight category. At age forty-two, Nchama made his official debut for the 2008 Summer Olympics in Beijing, where he competed in the men's half-middleweight class (81 kg). He received a bye for the second preliminary match, before losing out by an automatic ippon and a kata-gatame (seven mat holds) to Montenegro's Srđan Mrvaljević.
