= Ruth Mangue =

Equatoguinean athlete (born 1975)

Personal information
- Nationality: Equatorial Guinean
- Born: Ruth Mangue Nve; 23 June 1975 (age 50)

Sport
- Sport: Sprinting
- Event: 200 metres

Ruth Mangue Nve (born 23 June 1975) is an Equatorial Guinean sprinter. She competed in the women's 200 metres at the 1992 Summer Olympics.

Olympic Games
Preceded by Manuel Rondo	Flagbearer for Equatorial Guinea; Barcelona 1992	Succeeded by Gustavo Envela
