= Reïna-Flor Okori =

Equatoguinean hurdler (born 1980)

Reina-Flor Okori
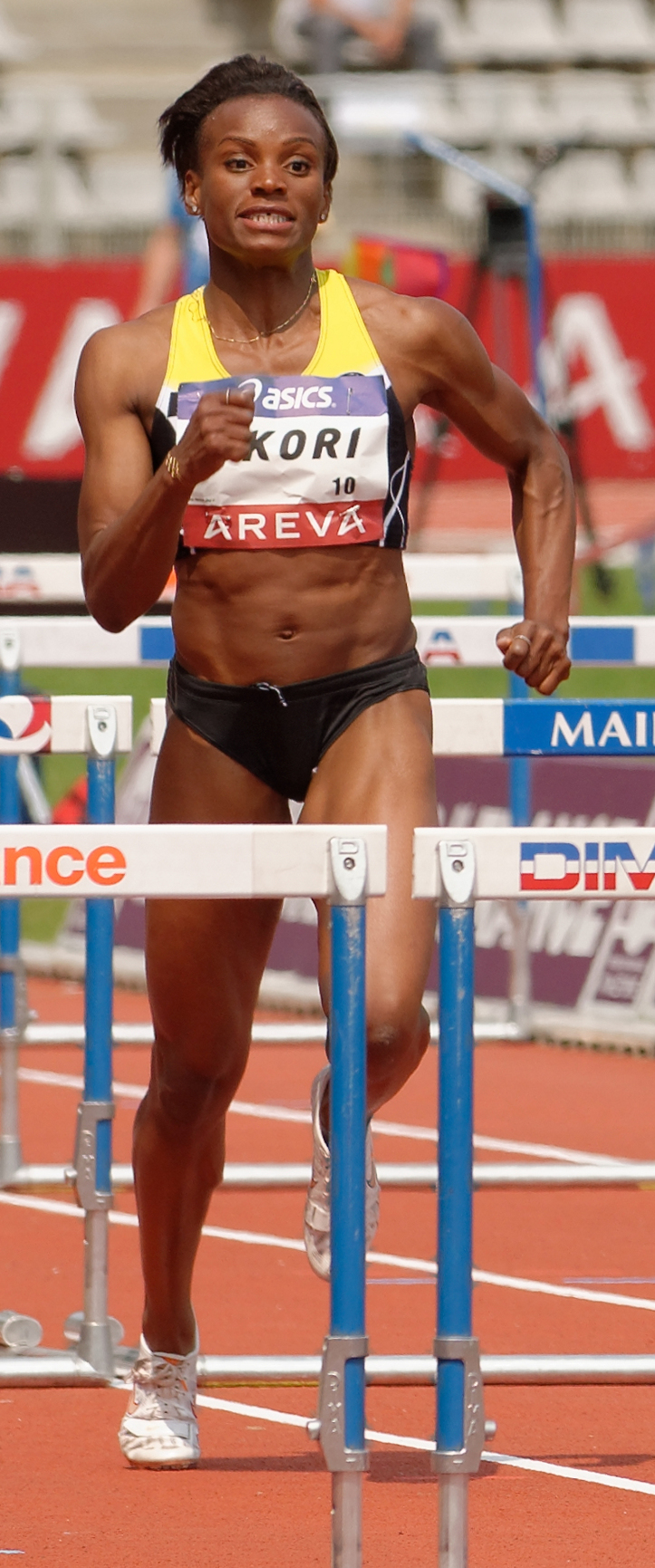
- Okori at the 2013 World Championships

Personal information
- Nationality: Equatoguinean; French
- Born: Reina-Flor Okori Makendengue; 2 May 1980 (age 46) Libreville, Gabon
- Height: 1.63 m (5 ft 4 in)
- Weight: 56 kg (123 lb)

Sport
- Country: Equatorial Guinea (2016); France (before 2016)
- Sport: Athletics (track and field)
- Event: 100 m hurdles
- Club: Doubs Sud Athlétisme
- Coached by: Patricia Girard

Reina-Flor Okori Makendengue (born 2 May 1980) is an Equatoguinean former track and field athlete who specialised in the 100 metres hurdles. She is a four-time Olympian with over 20 years on the track representing France and Equatorial Guinea. In 2015, she took allegiance back to Equatorial Guinea, represented her country for the 2016 Olympic Games, and became a flag bearer.

== Early life ==
Okori was born in Libreville, Gabon to Equatoguinean parents, exiles due to the political persecution during the dictatorship of Francisco Macías Nguema.

== Career ==
As a junior, Okori finished tenth in long jump at the 1996 World Junior Championships and won the 1999 European Junior Championships in 100 meters hurdles.

Okori finished fifth at the 2001 Summer Universiade and sixth at the 2007 European Indoor Championships. She competed at the 2004 Olympics, the 2005 European Indoor Championships, the 2005 World Championships and the 2006 European Championships, the 2013 European indoor championship in Goteborg and world outdoor world championships in Moscou reaching the semi-finals.

At the 2008 Olympics, Okori reached the semi-finals of the 100 metres hurdles. She repeated this feat at the 2012 Summer Olympics, but was disqualified in the semi-finals. She was the flag bearer of Equatorial Guinea at the 2016 Olympics, where she was going to represent the African country before finally retiring from athletics.

== Prize list ==
- 10 selections for French Elite Teams (as of 1/1/07)
- (gold) French Champion 2004 at 100 m hurdles in 12.71 s (+2,1 m/s)
- (gold) French Champion 2008 at 100 m hurdles in 12.78 s
- (gold) European Junior Champion 1999 at 100 m hurdles in 13.16 s
- (silver) Vice-champion of France 2005 at 100 m hurdles in 12.75 s (+0,9 m/s)
- (silver) Vice-champion of France 2006 at 100 m hurdles in 12.99 s (+0,7 m/s)
- (silver) Vice-champion of France 2012 at 100 m hurdles in 12.97 s (+1,3 m/s)
- (gold) Champion of France 2012 at 60 m hurdles Indoors in 8.08 s
- 1st in final of DécaNation 2006 in 12.87 s
- 6th in semi-final of 100 m hurdles at the 2004 Athens Olympic Games in 12.81 s
- 4th in final of 100 m hurdles at the 2005 Mediterranean Games in 13.20 s
- 6th in semi-final of the 100 m hurdles at the 2005 World Championships in 12.99 s
- 5th in semi-final of the 100 m hurdles at the 2006 European Championships in 13.08 s

== Personal bests ==
Records personnels
Event	Performance	Location	Date
100 m hurdles	12 s 65	Montgeron	11 May 2008

== Personal life ==
Okori's paternal grandfather was a Nigerian Igbo emigrant to the then Spanish Guinea. The rest of her grandparents were Equatoguinean Ndowé – her two grandmothers belonged to the Kombe tribe and her maternal grandfather belonged to the Bapuku tribe.

Olympic Games
Preceded by Bibiana Olama	Flagbearer for Equatorial Guinea; 2016 Rio de Janeiro	Succeeded by Alba Mbo Nchama Benjamín Enzema
