= Bartolomé Esono Asumu =

Equatoguinean middle-distance runner

Personal information
- Nationality: Equatoguinean
- Born: 25 May 1963 (age 63)

Sport
- Sport: Middle-distance running
- Event: 800 metres

Bartolomé Esono Asumu (born 25 May 1963) is an Equatoguinean middle-distance runner. He competed in the men's 800 metres at the 1984 Summer Olympics.
