= José Luis Ebatela Nvo =

Equatoguinean middle-distance runner

Personal information
- Nationality: Equatoguinean
- Born: 29 October 1972 (age 53)

Sport
- Sport: Middle-distance running
- Event: 1500 metres

José Luis Ebatela Nvo (born 29 October 1972) is an Equatoguinean middle-distance runner. He competed in the men's 1500 metres at the 2000 Summer Olympics. He won many national championships.
