= Paula Barila Bolopa =

Equatoguinean swimmer (born 1979)

Paula Barila
Personal information
- Full name: Paula Barila Bolopa
- Date of birth: 12 October 1979 (age 47)
- Place of birth: Baney, Equatorial Guinea

Senior career*
Years	Team	Apps	(Gls)
- E Waiso Ipola
- * Club domestic league appearances and goals

Paula Barila Bolopa (born 12 October 1979), nicknamed 'The Crawler', is an Equatoguinean former footballer and swimmer. She was one of two Equatorial Guinean swimmers to compete at the 2000 Summer Olympics in Sydney, the other being Eric Moussambani.

== Biography ==
Originally a footballer who played for women's first division side E Waiso Ipola, she was submitted to a swimming trials to participate at the 2000 Olympic Games and was selected after a month and a half of training.

Following Moussambani's struggling but courageous performance in the men's 100 metres freestyle event, the media turned their attention to his female compatriot. According to The Telegraph, "the spectator gallery was almost full as the news spread that a female Eric was making an appearance." A correspondent for The Times reported:

"Paula Barila Bolopa, still dripping wet from her swim, was under siege. Tape recorders were being thrust in her face and an interpreter was translating her comments from Spanish for American television stations. Somebody passed her a mobile phone so she could talk live to a radio presenter in Madrid and when she was asked whether she had signed any autographs since fame embraced her, she furrowed her brow in indignation. "Muchos," she said. She and Celebrity had quickly become fast friends."

Barila Bolopa competed in the women's 50 metres freestyle, and finished last in her heat with a time of 01:03.97, which was double the second-worst time, and reportedly the slowest time in Olympic history for that event. She received loud support and encouragement from spectators.

Barila Bolopa gained entry to the Olympics without meeting the minimum qualification requirements via a wildcard draw designed to encourage participation by developing countries without expensive training facilities. Equatorial Guinea only had two pools, neither of them Olympic-sized, and she had never swum in a 50-metre pool before. After the race, she commented: "It's the first time I've swam [sic] 50 metres. It was further than I thought. I was very tired."

The BBC commented: "Bolopa and Moussambani have become two of the stars of the Sydney Olympics much like Eddie "the Eagle" Edwards became a hero at the 1988 Calgary Olympics for his brave but laughable attempts at ski-jumping." The Telegraph likewise commented that Barila had "recapture[d] the spirit of Eddie the Eagle". The Agence France-Presse reported that she had "gained Olympic hero status", and commented: "She brought out the spectators' affection for a courageous, have-a-go hero who dared to compete knowing she would probably be the worst-ever Olympian in that event."

Barila worked as a supermarket cashier at the time of the Games.

== See also ==
- List of uncompetitive athletes
