= Mari Paz Mosanga Motanga =

Equatoguinean sprinter

Personal information
- Nationality: Equatoguinean
- Born: 16 October 1982 (age 43)

Sport
- Sport: Sprinting
- Event: 100 metres

Mari Paz Mosanga Motanga (born 16 October 1982) is an Equatoguinean sprinter. She competed in the women's 100 metres at the 2000 Summer Olympics.
