= Bernardo Elonga =

Equatoguinean middle-distance runner

Personal information
- Full name: Bernardo Elonga Molico
- Nationality: Equatoguinean
- Born: 22 February 1961 (age 64)

Sport
- Sport: Middle-distance running
- Event: 1500 metres

Bernardo Elonga Molico (born 22 February 1961) is an Equatoguinean middle-distance runner. He competed in the 1500 metres at the 1988 Summer Olympics and the 1992 Summer Olympics. He later was the trainer for Olympic swimmer Paula Barila Bolopa.
