= Mari-Cruz Evuna Andeme =

Equatoguinean politician and diplomat

Mari-Cruz Evuna Andeme is a politician and diplomat from Equatorial Guinea, serving as Secretary of State for International Organizations. She served from 1 July 2012 to July 2018 as the country's ambassador to the United Kingdom. As of December 2020 the ambassadorship was vacant.

Her father Alejandro Evuna Asangono Owono served as the Equatoguinean Minister to the Presidency in charge of Missions, and her brother Miguel Ntutumu Evuna Andeme was appointed as Equatorial Guinea's ambassador to the United States on 23 February 2015. She is a university graduate and speaks four languages.

She joined the diplomatic service in 1996 with a post in the Embassy to the United States. Before her posting to the United Kingdom she was Chargé d'affaires in the Embassy to Belgium with additional responsibility for Denmark, Norway, Luxembourg, the Netherlands, Sweden and the European Union. From 2008 to 2012 she worked on Equatorial Guinea's Economic Partnership Agreement (EPA) with the European Union, and from 2007 to 2012 she was a member of the Communications department of the national congress of the Democratic Party of Equatorial Guinea (PDG).

In 2014 she gave a speech to the Conservative Foreign and Commonwealth Council in which she introduced her country, describing it as "one of the fastest developing countries in Africa and indeed the world".
