= Juliana Obiong =

Equatoguinean sprinter (born 1966)

Juliana Nsang
Personal information
- Nationality: Equatorial Guinean
- Born: Juliana Nsang Obiang; 23 May 1966 (age 59)

Sport
- Sport: Sprinting
- Event: 100 metres

Juliana Nsang Obiang (born 23 May 1966) is an Equatorial Guinean sprinter. She competed in the women's 100 metres at the 1996 Summer Olympics. She was the first woman to represent Equatorial Guinea at the Olympics.
