= Marlene Mevong Mba =

Equatoguinean athlete

Personal information
- Born: 29 April 1990 (age 36)

Sport
- Country: Equatorial Guinea
- Sport: Athletics
- Event: 100 metres

Marlene Mevong Mba (born 29 April 1990) is an Equatoguinean sprinter. She competed in the 100 metres at the 2015 World Championships in Beijing without advancing from the first round.

== International competitions ==
Year	Competition	Venue	Position	Event	Notes
Representing Equatorial Guinea
2013	Jeux de la Francophonie	Nice, France	10th (h)	200 m	26.00
2014	World Indoor Championships	Sopot, Poland	42nd (h)	60 m	8.05
2015	World Championships	Beijing, China	50th (h)	100 m	12.56

== Personal bests ==
Outdoor

- 100 metres – 12.35 (+1.8 m/s, Barcelona 2015)
- 200 metres – 25.26 (+0.2 m/s, Zaragoza 2013)

Indoor

- 60 metres – 7.99 (Zaragoza 2008)
- 200 metres – 25.85 (San Sebastián 2008)
