= Emilia Mikue Ondo =

Equatoguinean middle-distance runner

Personal information
- Nationality: Equatoguinean
- Born: 20 December 1984 (age 41)
- Height: 1.60 m (5 ft 3 in)
- Weight: 63 kg (139 lb)

Sport
- Country: Equatorial Guinea
- Sport: Athletics
- Event: 800 metres

Achievements and titles
- Personal best: 800 m: 2:15.72 (2007)

Emilia Mikue Ondo (born 20 December 1984) is an Equatoguinean middle-distance runner. She set a personal best time of 2:15.72 for the 800 metres at the 2007 IAAF World Championships in Osaka, Japan. She is also a two-time flag bearer for Equatorial Guinea (2004 and 2008) at the Olympic opening ceremonies.

At age nineteen, Mikue Ondo made her official debut for the 2004 Summer Olympics in Athens, where she competed in the women's 800 metres. She finished seventh in the fourth heat of the event by sixteen seconds behind Kenya's Faith Macharia, with her slowest possible time of 2:22.88.

At the 2008 Summer Olympics in Beijing, Mikue Ondo competed again for the second time in the women's 800 metres. She ran in the fourth heat, against six other athletes, including former Olympic champion Maria Mutola of Mozambique. She finished the race in sixth place by twenty seconds behind Grenada's Neisha Bernard-Thomas, with a time of 2:20.69. Mikue Ondo, however, failed to advance into the semi-finals, as she placed thirty-ninth overall, and was ranked farther below three mandatory slots for the next round. She was eventually upgraded to a higher overall position when Croatia's Vanja Perišić had been disqualified for failing the doping test.

Olympic Games
Preceded by Eric Moussambani	Flagbearer for Equatorial Guinea; Athens 2004; Beijing 2008	Succeeded by Bibiana Olama
