= Roberto Mandje =

Equatoguinean athlete (born 1982)

Personal information
- Nationality: American (current), Equatorial Guinean (current)
- Born: Roberto Mandje; 7 March 1982 (age 44) Barcelona, Spain
- Height: 1.83 m (6 ft 0 in)
- Weight: 68 kg (150 lb)

Sport
- Country: Equatorial Guinea
- Sport: Middle-distance running

Roberto Mandje (born 7 March 1982) is an Olympic middle-distance and long-distance runner. Born in Spain, to Equatorial Guinean parents, Roberto lived in Barcelona until the age of 5, when he and his mother moved to Equatorial Guinea. After his mother remarried, Roberto's name was changed to Roberto Caracciolo. His stepfather, a diplomat, moved the family to several countries around Africa.

Following his parents' divorce, Roberto and his mother relocated to New York, where he attended high school and college. Mandje ran the steeplechase for the University of Albany track and field team.

In 2004, Mandje qualified for the 1500m and 3000m steeplechase, representing Equatorial Guinea at the Athens Olympic Games. During the first-round heat of the 1500m, which included world record-holder Hicham El Guerrouj of Morocco (the eventual Olympic champion), Roberto was tripped early in the race. Despite injuring his ankle, he finished in a time of 4:03.37. Unfortunately, the injury forced him to withdraw from the 3000-meter steeplechase.

From 2004 to 2016, Mandje competed professionally in track, road and trail races in the United States, Africa and Europe.

Mandje now works as a running and sports marketing consultant, coach, and celebrity trainer. Notably, he paced YouTuber Casey Neistat to a sub-3-hour marathon in December 2023 and guided Lil Nas X to complete his first half marathon in 2024.

Roberto is fluent in Spanish, French, English and German.

Personal bests:

1500m — 4:00.33 (Ninove, BEL), 11 AUG 2007

3000m SC — 9:04.54 (Los Angeles, CA, USA), 7 JUN 2008
