= Higinio Ndong Obama =

Equatoguinean swimmer (born 1998)

Higinio Ndong
Personal information
- Full name: Higinio Ndong Obama Nkara
- Born: 19 September 1998 (age 28) Mbom-Esisis, Niefang, Equatorial Guinea
- Height: 1.69 m (5 ft 7 in)

Sport
- Country: Equatorial Guinea
- Sport: Swimming
- Strokes: Freestyle
- Club: Malabo Swimming Club
- Coach: Florencio Engono

Higinio Ndong Obama Nkara (born 19 September 1998) is an Equatoguinean swimmer. He competed at the 2024 Summer Olympics and served as his country's co-flag bearer at the opening ceremony.

== Biography ==
Ndong was born on 19 September 1998 in the village of Mbom-Esisis, located in Niefang District, Centro Sur Province, Equatorial Guinea. He grew up in the country and became a competitive swimmer in 2013. A member of the Malabo Swimming Club, and coached by Florencio Engono, he regularly competed in short-distance events – including the 50 metres in freestyle, breaststroke and butterfly stroke, and in the 100 metres in freestyle. He won the gold medal at the district championships in 2019.

Ndong was selected to make his international debut at the 2021 FINA World Swimming Championships (25 m), although he ended up being a non-starter in both his scheduled events, the 50m and 100m freestyle. He competed at the 2022 African Swimming Championships as one of only two Equatoguineans. He also participated at the 2022 World Aquatics Championships in the 50m freestyle, being unable to advance past his heat with a time of 29.48 seconds, although a personal best. He competed for Equatorial Guinea at the 2023 African Games, hosted in Accra, and set a personal best time in the 50m butterfly at 32.54s, only eight-hundredths of a second slower than the national record, although he placed fourth in his heat and failed to advance.

Ndong was selected for the 2024 World Aquatics Championships, although he was a non-starter in both events he was chosen for, and was selected for the 2024 African Swimming Championships in four events. In July 2024, he received a universality selection to participate at the 2024 Summer Olympics, being one of only three Equatoguineans invited and the only swimmer. Along with Sefora Ada Eto, Ndong served as the co-flag bearer for his country at the opening Olympic ceremony. At the Olympics, he competed in the 50m freestyle event as part of heat two. He placed third in his heat with a time of 28.42, setting a personal best and the national record, although he failed to advance to the semifinals.

Olympic Games
| Preceded by Benjamín Enzema; Alba Mbo Nchama | Flag bearer for Equatorial Guinea; 2024 Paris with Sefora Ada Eto | Succeeded by Incumbent |
