= Eric Moussambani =

Equatoguinean swimmer (born 1978)

Personal information
- Full name: Eric Moussambani Malonga
- Born: 31 May 1978 (age 48) Malabo, Equatorial Guinea

Sport
- Country: Equatorial Guinea
- Sport: Swimming
- Events: 50 m freestyle; 100 m freestyle

Achievements and titles
- Personal bests: 50 m freestyle: 27.9s NR (2004); 100 m freestyle: 52.18s NR (2006)

Eric Moussambani Malonga (born 31 May 1978) is an Equatoguinean swimmer. Nicknamed Eric the Eel by the media, Moussambani gained brief international fame following his appearance at the 2000 Summer Olympics. Moussambani, who had never seen an Olympic-sized (50-metre [160 ft]) swimming pool before, swam his heat of the 100 metre freestyle on 19 September in a time of 1:52.72. This was the slowest time in Olympic history by far, and Moussambani had trouble finishing the race, but he won his heat after both his competitors were disqualified due to false starts. Although Moussambani's time was still too slow to advance to the next round, he set a new personal best and an Equatoguinean national record. Moussambani eventually lowered his national record to 57 seconds, almost halving the time of his Olympic performance. He later became the coach of the national swimming squad of Equatorial Guinea.

In 2006, Moussambani achieved his personal best for the 100 metre of 52.18 at a meet in Germany, more than 60 seconds faster than his 2000 Olympic race and 5.78 seconds behind the current world record of 46.40, set by Pan Zhanle at the Paris 2024 Olympic Games.

== Career ==
Moussambani gained entry to the Olympics without meeting the minimum qualification requirements via a wildcard draw designed to encourage participation by developing countries lacking full training facilities. Pieter van den Hoogenband won in a time of 48.30 seconds (setting a world record of 47.84 in the semi-finals); Moussambani took more than twice that time to finish (1:52.72). "The last 15 metres were very difficult", Moussambani said. Because the other two swimmers in his heat made false starts and were thus disqualified, he won the heat unopposed.

Before coming to the Olympics, Moussambani had never seen a 50-metre-long (160 ft) Olympic-size swimming pool. He took up swimming eight months before the Olympics and had practiced in a lake, and later a 12-metre-long (39 ft) swimming pool in a hotel in Malabo, that he was given access to only between 5 and 6 am.

Moussambani's performance generated spectator and media interest in Paula Barila Bolopa, the only other Equatoguinean swimmer at the 2000 Summer Olympics. Bolopa competed in the women's 50 metres freestyle event, struggling to finish the race with a time of 1:03.97. In setting a record for the slowest time in Olympic history for that event, she also achieved major celebrity status.

In 2001, Moussambani competed in the 50 metres freestyle at the 2001 World Aquatics Championship in Fukuoka, Japan, finishing 88th out of 92 athletes. He set a new Equatorial Guinean record for the distance. He was the first male athlete in the nation's history ever to participate in the event.

Despite eventually lowering his personal best in the 100 metres freestyle to under 57 seconds, Moussambani was denied entry into the 2004 Olympic Games due to a visa error. He did not take part in the 2008 Summer Olympics. In March 2012 he was appointed coach of the national swimming squad of Equatorial Guinea.

== Similarly acclaimed athletes ==
Some other athletes at the 2000 Olympics were compared to Moussambani, with Sports Illustrated compiling a list of "Worst Performances by Non-Equatorial Guineans" that included Mariana Canillas, Eka Purnama Indah, Martinho de Araujo, Sirivanh Ketavong, and Jean Patrick Aladd Sahajasein.

In subsequent Olympic Games, international media occasionally referred to Moussambani's potential successors—athletes who might record poor times. Before the 2008 Summer Olympics, media in several countries—including Australia, Denmark, Canada, New Zealand and the United Kingdom—suggested that Stany Kempompo Ngangola, a swimmer from DR Congo, would be the Olympics' next "Eric the Eel". The media also described ni-Vanuatu sprinter Elis Lapenmal and Palestinian swimmer Hamza Abdu as "potential successors to Moussambani". During the Games, Cook Islands swimmer Petero Okotai compared himself to "Eric the Eel" upon recording a disappointing time in his event. In the 2016 Olympic Games, Ethiopian swimmer Robel Habte was dubbed "Robel the Whale" after finishing half a lap behind his competitors in the 100-metre freestyle.

During the 2009 IAAF World Championships, various media around the world, including La Nación and The Daily Telegraph, described American Samoan sprinter Savannah Sanitoa as "the new Eric 'the Eel' Moussambani". London 2012 Olympic rower Hamadou Djibo Issaka of Niger was compared to Moussambani for his times of 8:25.56 in the men's single sculls qualifying heat and 9:07.99 in the E Semi-finals. Both times were over a minute off the next closest competitor in each race. Moussambani's exploits also triggered comparisons to the 1988 Winter Olympics, when both British ski-jumper Eddie the Eagle and the Jamaican bobsled team became objects of interest and amusement due to their improbable participation in their sports.

== See also ==
- Nasra Ali Abukar
- Rachael Gunn
- List of uncompetitive athletes

Olympic Games
Preceded by Gustavo Envela	Flagbearer for Equatorial Guinea; Sydney 2000	Succeeded by Emilia Mikue Ondo
