= Gus Envela Jr. =

Equatoguinean sprinter and actor

- Born: Gustavo Bodjedi Envela Mahua; Bata, Equatorial Guinea
- Education: Douglas McKay High School
- Occupations: Actor, politician, sprinter
- Father: Gustavo Envela

Gustavo Bodjedi Envela Mahua, known as Gus Envela Jr., is an Equatorial Guinean actor, politician and former sprinter, currently based in Washington, D.C., United States.

== Background and early life ==
Envela's father, Gustavo Envela-Makongo Sr., resigned as Equatorial Guinea's first ambassador to the United Nations in 1970 due to clashes with the Equatorial Guinean government. In 1970 the family, due to escalating political unrest in their native country, fled into exile and settled in Salem, Oregon.

Growing up in Salem, Envela gained notoriety at an early age as a standout sprinter, setting several national age-group records. He attended Waldo Middle School and Douglas McKay High School. While at McKay, he set state records in the 100 (10.49 seconds), 200 (21.33) and the 400 meter dashes (46.78), and took first place in the state meet in each of those events from 1984 to 1986.

== Sporting distinctions ==
Envela went on to run for Stanford University during his freshman year of college.

=== Record participant in the Olympics as sprinter ===
Additionally, after becoming the first athlete to compete in the Olympic games for Equatorial Guinea in 1984, he went on to compete in a total of 4 games – 1984, 1988, 1992, and 1996 – setting a record for appearances in the Olympics by a sprinter.

== Political and other activities ==
After graduating from Stanford in 1990, instead of pursuing professional sports, he set his eyes on running for president of his native Equatorial Guinea with hopes of establishing freedom of speech, raising the standard of living and education.

Envela scheduled his Washington agenda with the help of lobbyist and onetime deputy Senate legal counsel, Robert Kelley. In addition, Envela sought the advice of James Carville, ex-Clinton Administration advisor. He also worked with Warren Weinstein who was once with the United States Agency for International Development. Envela has recently been a consultant for Africa Global, a Washington, D.C.–based organization whose past clients include the current Dictator-President of Equatorial Guinea, Teodoro Obiang Nguema Mbasogo.

Envela currently lives in Mt. Lebanon, Pennsylvania, where he is president of Voice of Democracy. He and his wife Tomiko have two children including a daughter, their first born, Misako, as well as their second born Malaya. Misako is a senior in high school and is active in track like her father. Although his political aspirations seem to have been postponed, he has managed to hold his own in Hollywood with cameo roles in movies such as Sgt. Bilko and an appearance on the TV game show Wheel of Fortune.

He speaks native Fang with Spanish and English as his second languages.

Olympic Games
Preceded by Ruth Mangue	Flagbearer for Equatorial Guinea; Atlanta 1996	Succeeded by Eric Moussambani
