= Flag of Equatorial Guinea =

Republic of Equatorial Guinea
- Use: National flag and ensign
- Proportion: 2:3
- Adopted: 12 October 1968; 58 years ago (Note: Briefly replaced by a flag with a different coat of arms from 1978 to 21 August 1979, during the presidency of Francisco Macías Nguema.)
- Design: A horizontal tricolour of green, white, and red with a blue isosceles triangle based at the hoist and the coat of arms of Equatorial Guinea centered on the white band

The national flag of Equatorial Guinea is a horizontal tricolour of green, white, and red with a blue isosceles triangle based at the hoist and the coat of arms of Equatorial Guinea centered on the white band. The flag without the coat of arms was raised upon the country's independence from Spain on 12 October 1968. While both the flag and coat of arms were adopted at independence, the coat of arms was added to the flag later on. The coat of arms and accordingly the national flag were briefly changed from 1978 to 21 August 1979, during the presidency of Francisco Macías Nguema.

== Design and symbolism ==
The flag is a horizontal tricolour with green, white, and red bands, and a blue isosceles triangle based at the hoist. The white band is charged in the center with the coat of arms of Equatorial Guinea, a grey shield with a silk-cotton tree, the national motto in Spanish, and six six-pointed stars representing the country's five islands and continental territory. According to local legend, indigenous and Spanish representatives signed their first treaty under a silk-cotton tree, hence its centering on the flag.

According to American vexillologist Whitney Smith, the blue triangle represented the ocean connecting different parts of Equatorial Guinea, while green symbolised the country's vegetation, white symbolised peace, and red symbolised the blood shed for independence.

== History ==
When Equatorial Guinea gained its independence from Spain on 12 October 1968, it adopted its current coat of arms and raised a green, white, and red tricolour with a blue triangle at the hoist. The coat of arms was added to the flag sometime afterwards. In 1978, President Francisco Macías Nguema changed his nation's coat of arms to one consisting of a sword, a dagger, an axe, a club, a hoe, and a pickaxe, crowned with a chicken and surrounded by banderoles with the national motto. Macías Nguema was overthrown by his nephew Teodoro Obiang Nguema Mbasogo on 21 August 1979, and Equatorial Guinea's national symbols were reverted back to those before Macías Nguema's rule.

Flag used in Equatorial Guinea during Spanish colonisation (1785–1931)

Flag of Equatorial Guinea hoisted at independence on 12 October 1968

Flag of Equatorial Guinea from 1978 to 21 August 1979
