= Benjamín Enzema =

Equatoguinean athlete (born 1989)

Personal information
- Full name: Benjamín Manuel Enzema Owono
- Born: 25 March 1989 (age 37) Akoga, Equatorial Guinea

Benjamín Manuel Enzema Owono (born 25 March 1989) is an Equatorial Guinean athlete. In the 1500 m event at the 2009 World Championships in Berlin, he set a personal best time of 4:13.17. At the 2012 IAAF World Indoor Championships in Istanbul, Enzema set a new national record time in the 800 m with a 1:58.19. Three months later, at the 2012 African Championships in Porto-Novo, Benin, he shaved a further 1.9 seconds off the record, lowering it to 1:56.29.

He competed in the 800 m event at the 2012 Summer Olympics but was eliminated in the first round.

At the 2020 Summer Olympics, he competed in the men's 1500m event.

== Personal bests ==
- 800m - 1:51.54 (Cergy-Pontoise, France) 20 June 2017
- 1500m - 3:46.14 (Kortrijk, Belgium) 14 July 2018
- 3000m - 8:24.48 (Angoulême, France) 1 June 2018
- 5000m - 14:18.46 (Blois, France) 23 June 2018
- Marathon - 2:23:28 (Annecy, France) 14 Apr 2019

Olympic Games
Preceded by Reïna-Flor Okori	Flag bearer for Equatorial Guinea; 2020 Tokyo with Alba Mbo Nchama	Succeeded by Sefora Ada Eto; Higinio Ndong Obama
