= Olympic Committee of Equatorial Guinea =

National Olympic Committee

- Country/Region: Equatorial Guinea
- Code: GEQ
- Created: 1980
- Recognized: 1984
- Continental Association: ANOCA
- Headquarters: Malabo, Equatorial Guinea
- President: Manuel Sabino Asumu Cawan
- Secretary General: Pedro-Mabale Fuga Afang

The Olympic Committee of Equatorial Guinea (Spanish: Comité Olímpico de Guinea Ecuatorial; IOC code: GEQ) is the National Olympic Committee representing Equatorial Guinea.

== See also ==
- Equatorial Guinea at the Olympics
