= Olds-Robb Recreation-Intramural Complex =

Recreation center in Ypsilanti, Michigan

Coordinates: 42.2508°N 83.6247°W

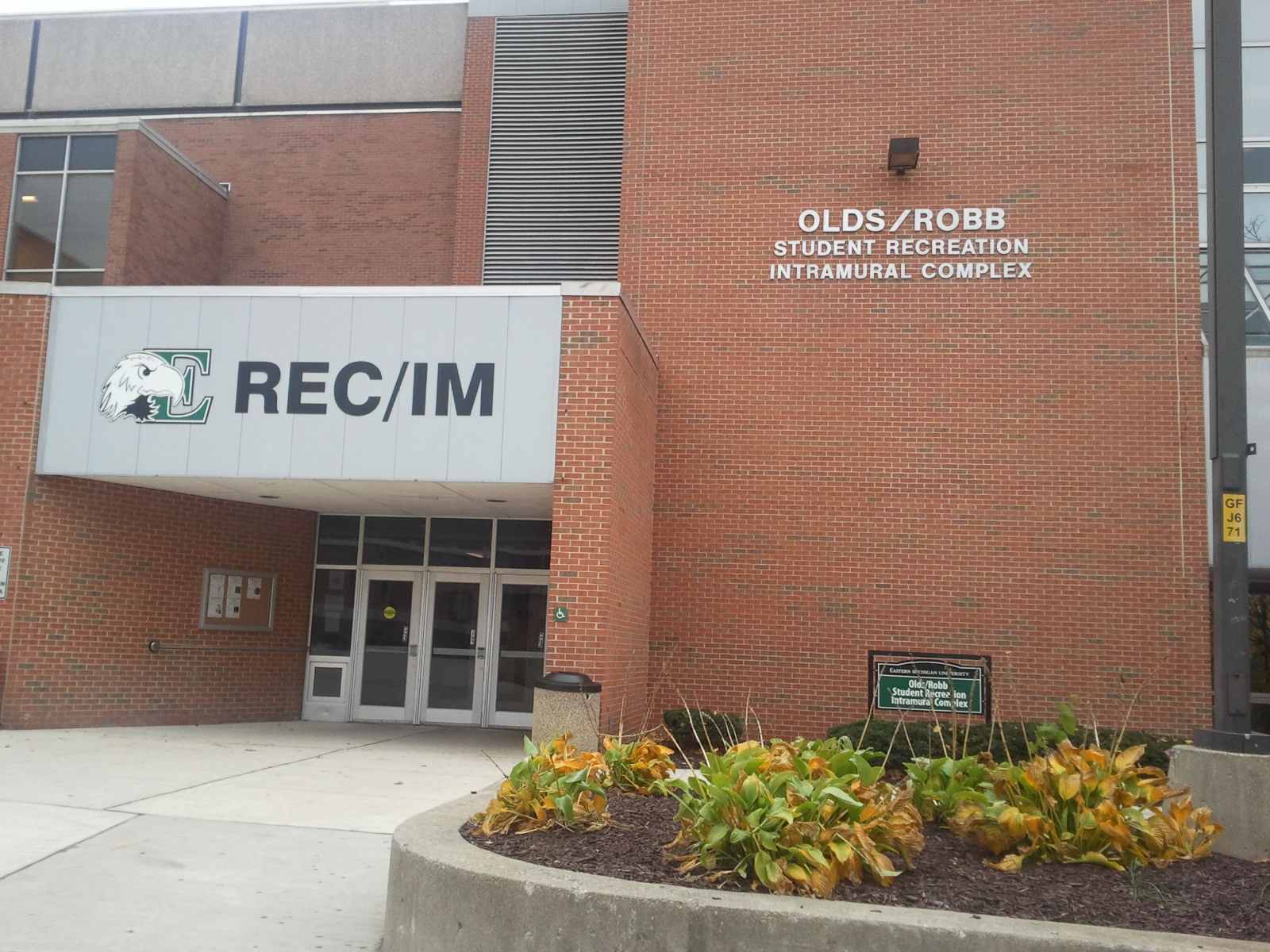
The Emu Rec/Im building

The Olds-Robb Recreation-Intramural Complex is Eastern Michigan University's recreation center. The Olds-Robb Rec/IM encompasses several buildings on campus. The Olds-Robb Student Recreation/Intramural Complex (commonly called "the Rec/IM"), which opened in 1982, contains an indoor track, two weight rooms, and a whirlpool, as well as Jones Natatorium, Big Bob's Lake House (used by many student organizations for events, near the center of campus on university park) and a picnic area between the Rec/IM building and Downing Hall. The Rec/IM is also attached to Bowen Field House.

== History ==
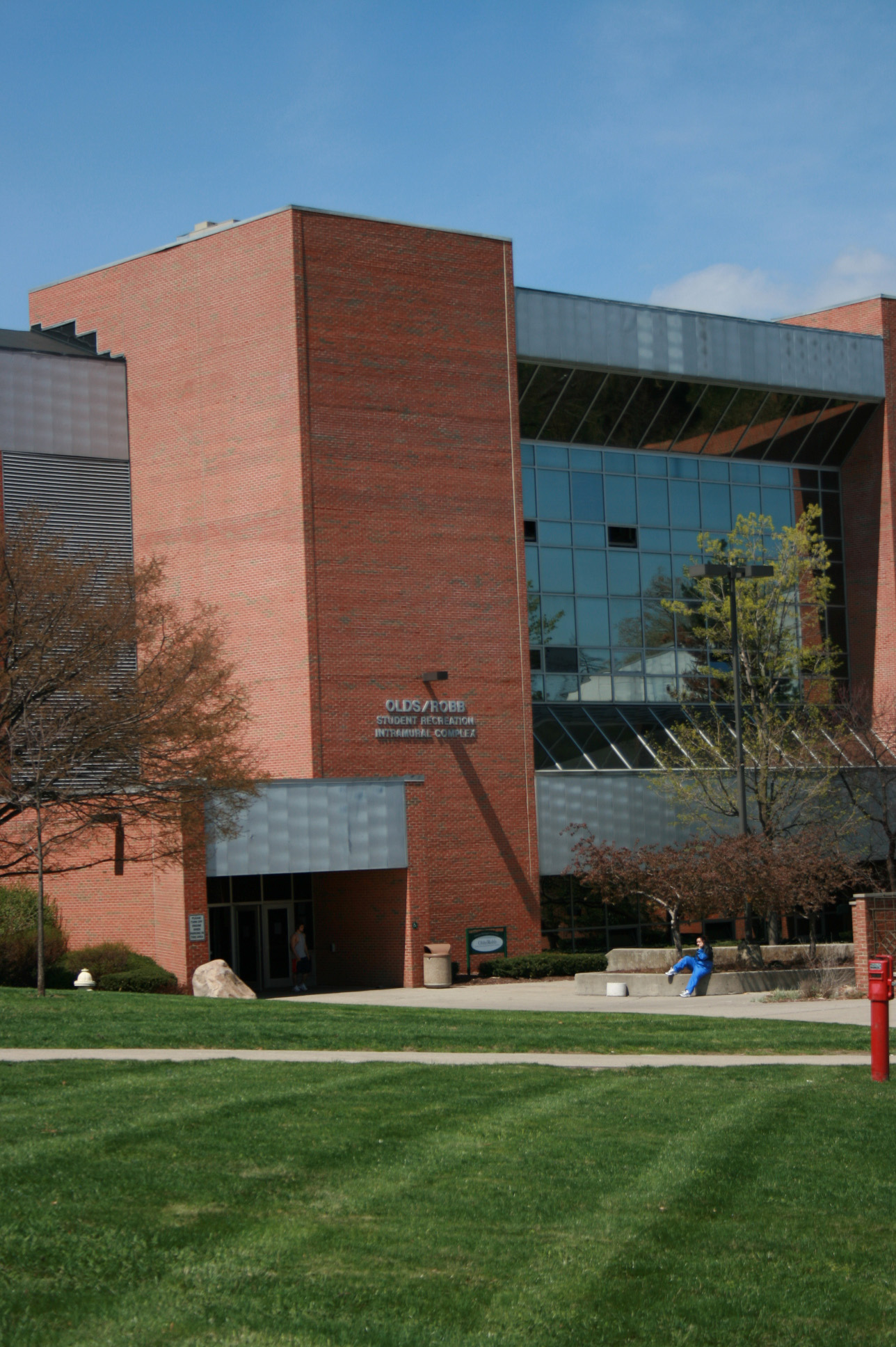
REC IM alternate view

The building was first called the Lloyd W. Olds Rec/IM. It was named for Lloyd W. Olds, who graduated from Eastern Michigan University in 1916. After receiving his PhD, he returned to the university, and he joined the Department of Physical Education. He coached the Eastern Michigan University track team, and also founded Eastern Michigan's most praised Intramural program during the 1920s. Olds also, originated the idea of a striped shirt for intramural officials.

When the building was first built in 1982 it contained the largest indoor swimming pool in the state. The pool varied between 3 and 17 feet in depth. it was named after EMU swim coach Michael H. Jones. Michael coached with the EMU swim team from 1956 until he retired in 1988. The Jones Pool is an Olympic-sized 50M pool with spring (1M and 3M) and platform (5M, 7M, and 10M) diving boards. It is the home to the EMU Swimming and Diving teams and numerous state and local swimming and diving competitions.

The Building was remodeled in 1991 to include an aerobics studio, a second weight room, a new wrestling/combative room and food concessions. In 1992, there was construction on the outside of the building to make an Outdoor recreational facility. The facility added Board of Regents member Dr. Richard Robb's name to the building at this time. Robb supported Olds, and included/ contributed University Park, which was the Recreation Center's Outdoor facility. University park contains two lighted basketball courts, two lighted volleyball courts, a six-foot-deep lake with two fountains, and Big Bob's Lake House. In 1993, the Recreation Center was named Olds-Robb Recreation-Intramural Complex.

== Building ==
The building was built by the architect Ralph Calder and Associates from Detroit, Michigan and was opened in 1982. The style of the architecture is Post modern architecture. The building itself is five stories high, and it is connected to a building called Warner, where the club pool is located. The building also contains racquetball courts, aerobics studios, basketball courts, an indoor running track and conference rooms.

=== Lake House ===
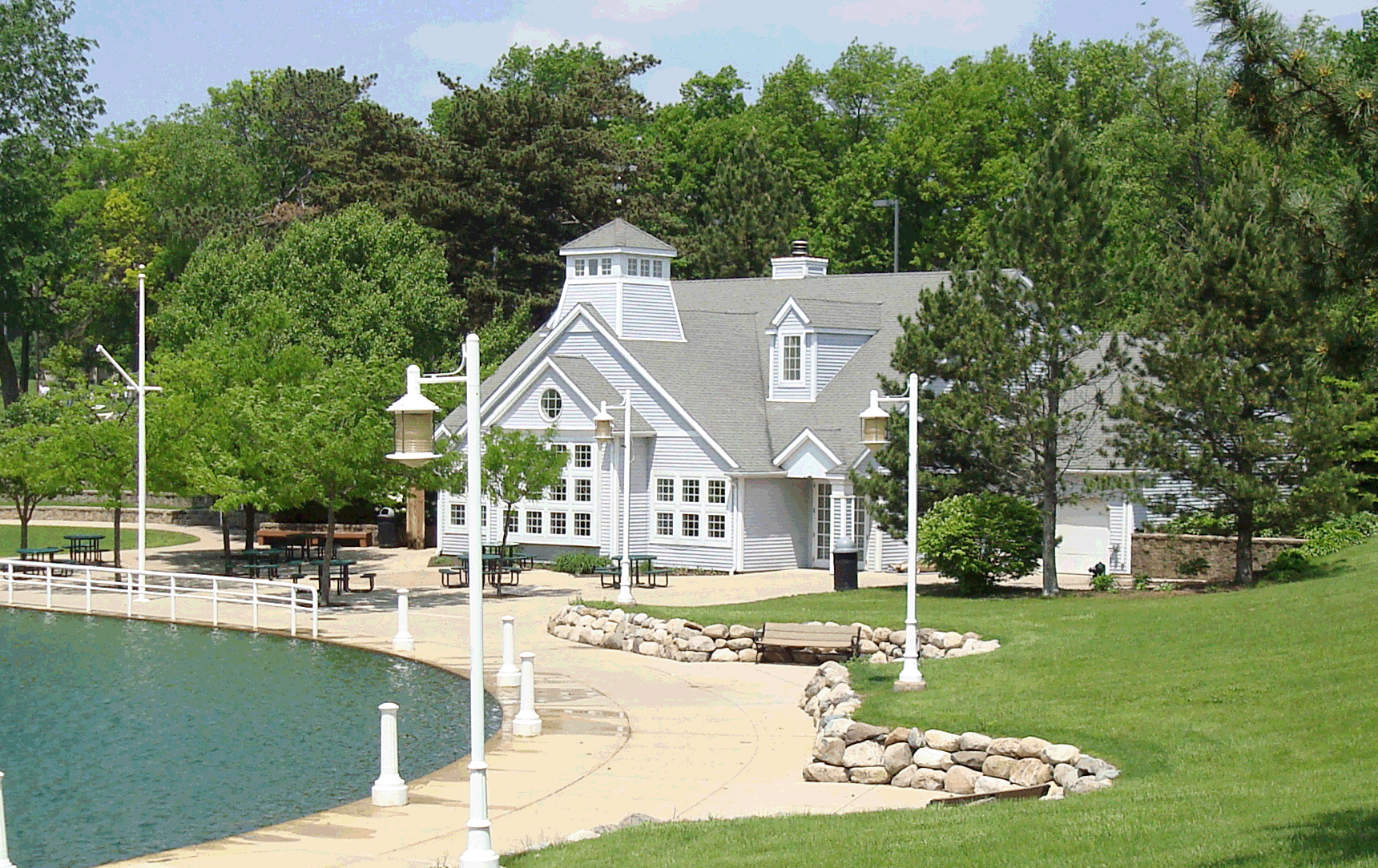
Lake House on University Park

The Lake House on located on University Park near the Student Center, an 800-seat outdoor amphitheater and the Rec/IM. Students refer to the building as "Big Bob's Lake House" after long-time former Rec/IM Director Bob England. The Lake House is maintained by the Rec/IM. During the school year the building is used by various student organizations especially during the fall semester. In addition, the lake house is used for large events such as Relay For Life. During the winter months, students can rent ice skates to use on the frozen pond. The area near the Lake House includes volleyball courts, running trails, and a picnic area with horseshoe pits. The lake house and pond were constructed in 1992.

=== Bowen Field House ===
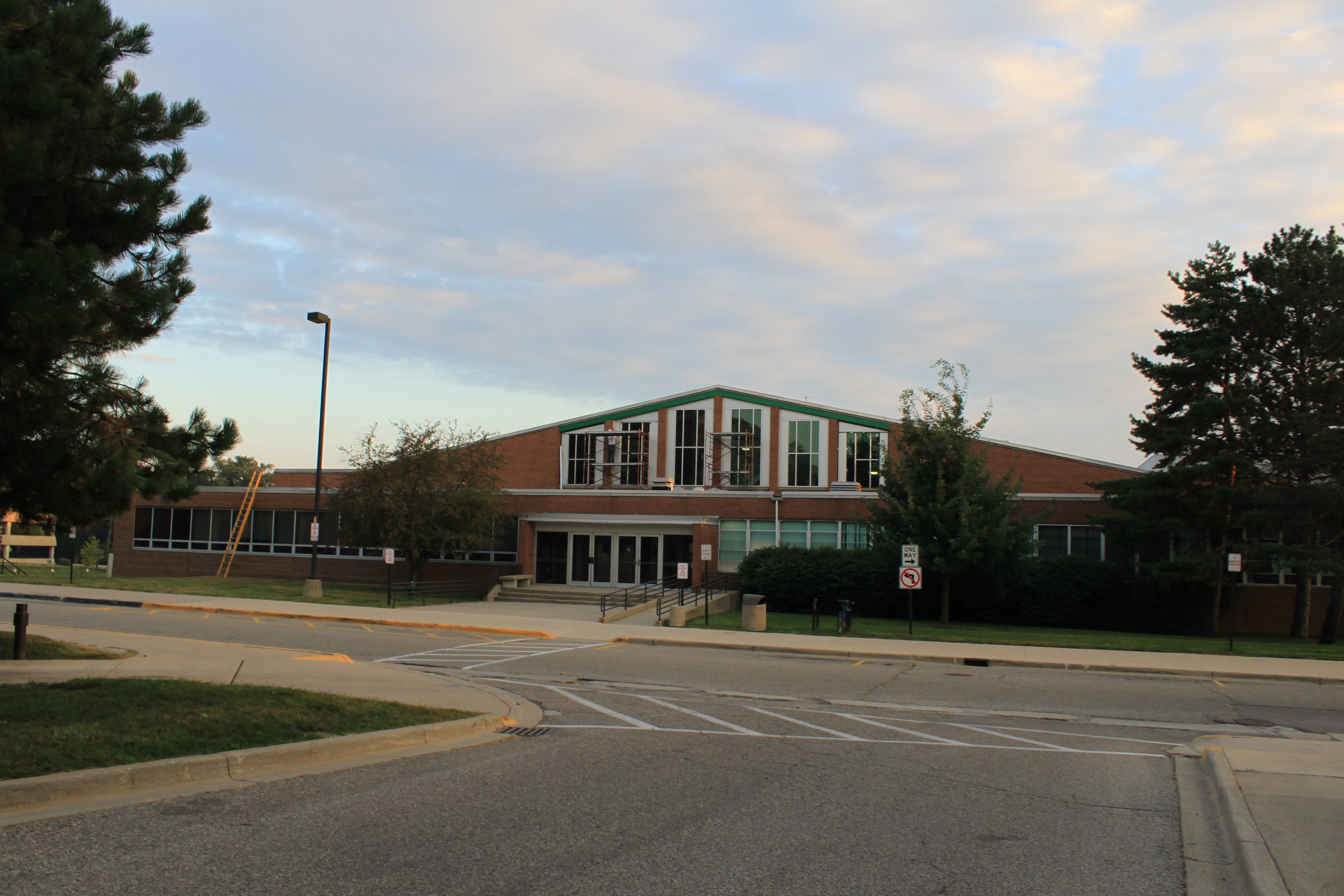
Bowen Field House

Bowen Field House is a multi-purpose arena in Ypsilanti, Michigan and is attached to Olds-Robb Rec IM. It opened in 1955 and currently serves as the home of Eastern Michigan Eagles track and field, Eastern Michigan Eagles wrestling, and Eastern Michigan Eagles gymnastics.
