= Athletics at the 1979 Pan American Games – Men's 800 metres =

Men's 800 metres at the 1979 Pan American Games
- Venue: Estadio Sixto Escobar
- Dates: 7–9 July
- Winning time: 1:46.3

Medalists
Gold medal	James Robinson	United States
Silver medal	Alberto Juantorena	Cuba
Bronze medal	Agberto Guimarães	Brazil

The men's 800 metres sprint competition of the athletics events at the 1979 Pan American Games took place on 7,8 and 9 July at the Estadio Sixto Escobar. The defending Pan American Games champion was Luis Medina of Cuba.

== Records ==
Prior to this competition, the existing world and Pan American Games records were as follows:

World record	Sebastian Coe (GBR)	1:42.33	Oslo, Norway	July 5, 1979
Pan American Games record	Ronnie Ray (USA)	1:47.98	Mexico City, Mexico	1975

== Results ==
KEY:	WR	World Record	GR	Pan American Record

=== Heats ===
Rank	Heat	Name	Nationality	Time	Notes
1	1	James Robinson	United States	1:50.9	Q
2	1	Christian Molina	Chile	1:51.1	Q
2	2	Alberto Juantorena	Cuba	1:51.1	Q
2	2	Michael Watson	Bermuda	1:51.1	Q
5	1	Alberto Lopes	Brazil	1:51.2	Q
6	1	Víctor Ramos	Puerto Rico	1:51.2	Q
7	1	Leandro Civil	Cuba	1:51.2	Q
8	2	Doug Wournell	Canada	1:51.7	Q
9	1	Omar Amdematten	Argentina	1:51.8	q
9	3	Owen Hamilton	Jamaica	1:51.8	Q
11	2	Francisco Solis	Dominican Republic	1:52.0	Q
12	3	Mike White	United States	1:52.1	Q
13	2	Gustavo Rivera	Puerto Rico	1:52.2	Q
14	3	Agberto Guimarães	Brazil	1:53.1	Q
15	3	Emilio Ulloa	Chile	1:53.3	Q
16	3	Gerold Pawirodikromo	Suriname	1:54.2	Q
17	2	Rigoberto Meléndez	Honduras	2:01.9	
18	2	Alexander Bridges	Antigua and Barbuda	2:02.2	

=== Semifinals ===
Rank	Heat	Name	Nationality	Time	Notes
1	1	Owen Hamilton	Jamaica	1:48.3	Q
2	1	James Robinson	United States	1:48.4	Q
3	1	Agberto Guimarães	Brazil	1:48.8	Q
4	1	Emilio Ulloa	Chile	1:48.8	q
5	1	Leandro Civil	Cuba	1:49.0	q
6	1	Michael Watson	Bermuda	1:49.4	
7	1	Gerold Pawirodikromo	Suriname	1:50.7	
8	2	Alberto Juantorena	Cuba	1:50.9	Q
9	2	Christian Molina	Chile	1:51.1	Q
10	2	Doug Wournell	Canada	1:51.1	Q
11	2	Mike White	United States	1:51.1	
12	1	Víctor Ramos	Puerto Rico	1:51.5	
13	2	Omar Amdematten	Argentina	1:52.0	
14	2	Alberto Lopes	Brazil	1:52.5	
15	2	Francisco Solis	Dominican Republic	1:52.7	
16	2	Gustavo Rivera	Puerto Rico	1:52.9	

=== Final ===
Rank	Name	Nationality	Time	Notes
1st place, gold medalist(s)	James Robinson	United States	1:46.3	GR
2nd place, silver medalist(s)	Alberto Juantorena	Cuba	1:46.4	
3rd place, bronze medalist(s)	Agberto Guimarães	Brazil	1:46.8	
4	Owen Hamilton	Jamaica	1:47.3	
5	Emilio Ulloa	Chile	1:49.2	
6	Leandro Civil	Cuba	1:49.5	
7	Doug Wournell	Canada	1:50.0	
8	Christian Molina	Chile	1:51.7	
