= Eastern Michigan Eagles track and field =

American college track and field team

- University: Eastern Michigan University
- Head coach: Sterling Roberts (men); Chris Best (women)
- Conference: MAC
- Location: Ypsilanti, Michigan
- Outdoor track: Olds/Marshall/Parks Track
- Nickname: Eagles
- Colors: Green and white

The Eastern Michigan Eagles track and field team is the track and field program that represents Eastern Michigan University. The Eagles compete in NCAA Division I as a member of the Mid-American Conference. The team is based in Ypsilanti, Michigan, at the Olds/Marshall/Parks Track.

The program is coached by Sterling Roberts (men) and Chris Best (women). The track and field program officially encompasses four teams because the NCAA considers men's and women's indoor track and field and outdoor track and field as separate sports.

Hurdler Hayes Jones won an Olympic gold medal in the 110 m hurdles in 1964 and a bronze in 1960 following winning both the 220 yards hurdles and the sprint hurdles for Eastern Michigan at the 1959 NCAA Track and Field Championships. 1976 Olympic 100 m champion Hasley Crawford also competed for the Eagles, winning the 60 yards at the 1975 NCAA Division I Indoor Track and Field Championships and 100 yards at the 1975 NCAA Division I Outdoor Track and Field Championships. 800 m NCAA champion Earl Jones won the 1984 Olympic bronze medal over the same distance, while Eagles sprinters Savatheda Fynes and Clement Chukwu both won Olympic gold medals in relays at the 2000 Summer Olympics. In 2026, EMU distance medley relay All-American Jasmine Jones won a bronze medal in the two-woman bobsleigh event at the 2026 Winter Olympics.

== Postseason ==
=== AIAW ===
The Eagles have had four AIAW All-Americans finishing in the top six at the AIAW indoor or outdoor championships.

AIAW All-Americans
Championships	Name	Event	Place
1978 Indoor	Athlen Bowles	60 yards	3rd
1978 Indoor	Karen McDougall	600 yards	3rd
1979 Indoor	Ann Meacham	Long jump	3rd
1979 Indoor	Cheryl Williams	Long jump	5th
1981 Indoor	Ann Meacham	Long jump	6th

=== NCAA ===
As of August 2025, a total of 48 men and 13 women have achieved individual first-team All-American status for the team at the Division I men's outdoor, women's outdoor, men's indoor, or women's indoor national championships (using the modern criteria of top-8 placing regardless of athlete nationality).

First team NCAA All-Americans
Team	Championships	Name	Event	Place	Ref.
Men's	1928 Outdoor	Leroy Potter	Mile run	2nd	
Men's	1931 Outdoor	Bob Arnold	400 meters	4th	
Men's	1931 Outdoor	Gene Beatty	220 yards hurdles	6th	
Men's	1932 Outdoor	Bob Arnold	400 meters	3rd	
Men's	1932 Outdoor	Gene Beatty	400 meters hurdles	1st	
Men's	1932 Outdoor	Jim McKinley	Pole vault	2nd	
Men's	1933 Outdoor	Ray Lowry	Pole vault	5th	
Men's	1934 Outdoor	William Zepp	3000 meters	2nd	
Men's	1934 Outdoor	Ray Lowry	Pole vault	3rd	
Men's	1935 Outdoor	William Zepp	3000 meters	3rd	
Men's	1936 Outdoor	William Hawthorne	Long jump	8th	
Men's	1940 Outdoor	Tom Quinn	3000 meters	4th	
Men's	1941 Outdoor	Whitey Hlad	110 meters hurdles	4th	
Men's	1941 Outdoor	Whitey Hlad	220 yards hurdles	5th	
Men's	1942 Outdoor	Whitey Hlad	220 yards hurdles	5th	
Men's	1949 Outdoor	Al Pingel	Mile run	7th	
Men's	1954 Outdoor	Duane Root	110 meters hurdles	7th	
Men's	1959 Outdoor	Hayes Jones	220 yards hurdles	1st	
Men's	1959 Outdoor	Hayes Jones	110 meters hurdles	1st	
Men's	1960 Outdoor	Mauri Jormakka	3000 meters steeplechase	3rd	
Men's	1966 Indoor	Terry Ivorman	800 meters	5th	
Men's	1966 Indoor	Bill Barrett	Pole vault	4th	
Men's	1970 Indoor	James Grant	400 meters	5th	
Men's	1971 Indoor	Wayne Seiler	1000 meters	5th	
Men's	1971 Outdoor	Gordon Minty	5000 meters	4th	
Men's	1972 Indoor	Gary Collins	4 × 400 meters relay	4th	
Men's	1972 Indoor	Ian Hall	4 × 400 meters relay	4th	
Men's	1972 Indoor	Willie Sims	4 × 400 meters relay	4th	
Men's	1972 Indoor	Stan Vinson	4 × 400 meters relay	4th	
Men's	1972 Outdoor	Gordon Minty	10,000 meters	2nd	
Men's	1974 Indoor	Stan Vinson	600 yards	1st	
Men's	1974 Indoor	Gordon Minty	5000 meters	4th	
Men's	1974 Outdoor	Gordon Minty	5000 meters	8th	
Men's	1975 Indoor	Hasely Crawford	55 meters	1st	
Men's	1975 Indoor	Stan Vinson	600 yards	1st	
Men's	1975 Indoor	Jim Deren	Mile run	4th	
Men's	1975 Outdoor	Hasely Crawford	100 meters	1st	
Men's	1976 Indoor	Mike Arnold	Distance medley relay	4th	
Men's	1976 Indoor	Jeff Dils	Distance medley relay	4th	
Men's	1976 Indoor	Dave Burkhart	Distance medley relay	4th	
Men's	1976 Indoor	Jim Deren	Distance medley relay	4th	
Men's	1978 Indoor	Jeff Dils	400 meters	5th	
Men's	1978 Indoor	Craig Gully	4 × 800 meters relay	5th	
Men's	1978 Indoor	Jerry Wojtala	4 × 800 meters relay	5th	
Men's	1978 Indoor	Roger Jones	4 × 800 meters relay	5th	
Men's	1978 Indoor	Maurice Weaver	4 × 800 meters relay	5th	
Men's	1979 Indoor	Jeff Dils	400 meters	4th	
Men's	1979 Indoor	Craig Gully	Distance medley relay	4th	
Men's	1979 Indoor	Billy Ray	Distance medley relay	4th	
Men's	1979 Indoor	Maurice Weaver	Distance medley relay	4th	
Men's	1979 Indoor	Roger Jones	Distance medley relay	4th	
Men's	1979 Outdoor	Jeff Dils	400 meters hurdles	4th	
Men's	1982 Indoor	Mike Calhoun	Distance medley relay	5th	
Men's	1982 Indoor	Chris Lezovich	Distance medley relay	5th	
Men's	1982 Indoor	Dan Shamiyeh	Distance medley relay	5th	
Men's	1982 Indoor	Erik Henriksen	Distance medley relay	5th	
Men's	1983 Outdoor	Earl Jones	1500 meters	2nd	
Men's	1984 Indoor	Joe Codrington	Distance medley relay	1st	
Men's	1984 Indoor	Erik Frederick	Distance medley relay	1st	
Men's	1984 Indoor	Dan Sahmiyeh	Distance medley relay	1st	
Men's	1984 Indoor	Earl Jones	Distance medley relay	1st	
Men's	1984 Outdoor	Earl Jones	800 meters	2nd	
Men's	1985 Indoor	Earl Jones	800 meters	1st	
Men's	1985 Outdoor	Earl Jones	800 meters	1st	
Men's	1985 Outdoor	Earl Jones	1500 meters	6th	
Men's	1986 Outdoor	Mark Smith	3000 meters steeplechase	4th	
Men's	1988 Outdoor	Don Johns	10,000 meters	2nd	
Men's	1988 Outdoor	Chuck Wilson	4 × 400 meters relay	5th	
Men's	1988 Outdoor	Dazel Jules	4 × 400 meters relay	5th	
Men's	1988 Outdoor	Willie Jenkins	4 × 400 meters relay	5th	
Men's	1988 Outdoor	Carl Johnson	4 × 400 meters relay	5th	
Women's	1988 Outdoor	Donna Donakowski	3000 meters	6th	
Men's	1989 Indoor	Mark Daily	800 meters	3rd	
Men's	1990 Indoor	Dazel Jules	200 meters	6th	
Men's	1990 Indoor	Mark Daily	800 meters	2nd	
Women's	1990 Outdoor	Mireille Sankatsing	800 meters	6th	
Men's	1991 Indoor	Chuck Wilson	400 meters	3rd	
Men's	1991 Indoor	Mark Daily	800 meters	2nd	
Women's	1991 Indoor	Mireille Sankatsing	800 meters	2nd	
Men's	1991 Outdoor	Chuck Wilson	400 meters	3rd	
Men's	1991 Outdoor	Tommy Asinga	800 meters	2nd	
Women's	1991 Outdoor	Mireille Sankatsing	800 meters	4th	
Men's	1992 Indoor	Tommy Asinga	800 meters	6th	
Men's	1992 Indoor	Dominic Middleton	5000 meters	6th	
Women's	1992 Indoor	Mireille Sankatsing	800 meters	1st	
Women's	1992 Outdoor	Mireille Sankatsing	800 meters	4th	
Men's	1993 Indoor	Tommy Asinga	800 meters	4th	
Men's	1993 Indoor	Carl Lowe	4 × 800 meters relay	1st	
Men's	1993 Indoor	Paul McMullen	4 × 800 meters relay	1st	
Men's	1993 Indoor	Greg Rhymer	4 × 800 meters relay	1st	
Men's	1993 Indoor	Tommy Asinga	4 × 800 meters relay	1st	
Women's	1993 Indoor	Joy Inniss	Triple jump	5th	
Men's	1993 Outdoor	Paul McMullen	1500 meters	8th	
Men's	1994 Indoor	Tiberia Patterson	55 meters hurdles	4th	
Men's	1994 Indoor	Greg Rhymer	800 meters	6th	
Men's	1994 Indoor	Tommy Asinga	800 meters	8th	
Men's	1994 Indoor	Paul McMullen	Mile run	4th	
Men's	1994 Indoor	Tommy Asinga	Distance medley relay	7th	
Men's	1994 Indoor	Carl Lowe	Distance medley relay	7th	
Men's	1994 Indoor	Jason Boothroyd	Distance medley relay	7th	
Men's	1994 Indoor	Paul McMullen	Distance medley relay	7th	
Women's	1994 Indoor	Joy Inniss	Triple jump	7th	
Men's	1994 Outdoor	Tommy Asinga	800 meters	4th	
Men's	1994 Outdoor	Paul McMullen	1500 meters	4th	
Men's	1995 Indoor	Paul McMullen	Mile run	3rd	
Men's	1995 Indoor	Jeff Beyst	Distance medley relay	2nd	
Men's	1995 Indoor	Kerch Patterson Jr.	Distance medley relay	2nd	
Men's	1995 Indoor	Jason Boothroyd	Distance medley relay	2nd	
Men's	1995 Indoor	Paul McMullen	Distance medley relay	2nd	
Women's	1995 Indoor	Sevatheda Fynes	55 meters	2nd	
Men's	1995 Outdoor	Paul McMullen	1500 meters	2nd	
Women's	1995 Outdoor	Sevatheda Fynes	100 meters	2nd	
Women's	1995 Outdoor	Sevatheda Fynes	200 meters	1st	
Men's	1996 Indoor	Kealoha Stokes	Distance medley relay	3rd	
Men's	1996 Indoor	Kerch Patterson Jr.	Distance medley relay	3rd	
Men's	1996 Indoor	Jason Boothroyd	Distance medley relay	3rd	
Men's	1996 Indoor	Ben Reese	Distance medley relay	3rd	
Men's	1997 Indoor	Clement Chukwu	400 meters	2nd	
Men's	1997 Indoor	Ben Reese	Mile run	6th	
Men's	1997 Indoor	Mike Franko	Distance medley relay	7th	
Men's	1997 Indoor	Fabian Rollins	Distance medley relay	7th	
Men's	1997 Indoor	Derrick Jackson	Distance medley relay	7th	
Men's	1997 Indoor	Ben Reese	Distance medley relay	7th	
Men's	1997 Outdoor	Clement Chukwu	400 meters	2nd	
Men's	1997 Outdoor	Ben Reese	1500 meters	3rd	
Men's	1998 Indoor	Clement Chukwu	400 meters	5th	
Men's	1998 Indoor	Fabian Rollins	400 meters	6th	
Women's	1998 Indoor	Jenell Ali	55 meters	5th	
Men's	1998 Outdoor	Clement Chukwu	400 meters	4th	
Men's	1998 Outdoor	Jamie Nieto	High jump	6th	
Men's	1999 Indoor	Clement Chukwu	200 meters	2nd	
Men's	1999 Indoor	Jamie Nieto	High jump	3rd	
Men's	1999 Outdoor	Clement Chukwu	400 meters	1st	
Women's	1999 Outdoor	Carrie Gould	10,000 meters	4th	
Men's	2000 Indoor	Ben Reese	Mile run	3rd	
Women's	2000 Indoor	Domtila Mwei	Mile run	8th	
Women's	2001 Indoor	Hanna Palamaa	Pole vault	6th	
Women's	2001 Outdoor	Domtila Mwei	1500 meters	8th	
Men's	2002 Outdoor	Jordan Desilets	3000 meters steeplechase	5th	
Men's	2002 Outdoor	Boaz Cheboiywo	10,000 meters	1st	
Men's	2003 Indoor	Boaz Cheboiywo	3000 meters	5th	
Men's	2003 Indoor	Boaz Cheboiywo	5000 meters	2nd	
Men's	2003 Outdoor	Jordan Desilets	3000 meters steeplechase	2nd	
Women's	2003 Outdoor	Brit Klanert	Javelin throw	4th	
Men's	2004 Indoor	Jordan Desilets	Mile run	7th	
Men's	2004 Outdoor	Jordan Desilets	3000 meters steeplechase	1st	
Men's	2004 Outdoor	Gavin Thompson	10,000 meters	8th	
Women's	2005 Outdoor	Lela Nelson	Long jump	3rd	
Women's	2005 Outdoor	Lela Nelson	Heptathlon	1st	
Men's	2007 Outdoor	Corey Notwtizke	3000 meters steeplechase	5th	
Men's	2009 Outdoor	Josh Karanja	3000 meters steeplechase	6th	
Men's	2014 Indoor	Max Babits	Pole vault	5th	
Women's	2014 Indoor	Sarah Chauchard	Pentathlon	6th	
Men's	2014 Outdoor	Donald Scott	Triple jump	6th	
Women's	2014 Outdoor	Sarah Chauchard	Heptathlon	5th	
Men's	2015 Indoor	Donald Scott	Triple jump	2nd	
Men's	2015 Outdoor	Donald Scott	Triple jump	3rd	
Men's	2016 Indoor	Anthony Jones	Weight throw	7th	
Women's	2017 Indoor	Jordann McDermitt	5000 meters	6th	
Women's	2017 Outdoor	Alsu Bogdanova	5000 meters	2nd	
Women's	2018 Indoor	Alsu Bogdanova	Distance medley relay	7th	
Women's	2018 Indoor	Jasmine Jones	Distance medley relay	7th	
Women's	2018 Indoor	Jenna Wyns	Distance medley relay	7th	
Women's	2018 Indoor	Natalie Cizmas	Distance medley relay	7th	
Men's	2021 Indoor	Baldvin Magnusson	3000 meters	7th	
Men's	2022 Indoor	Taige Bryant	Weight throw	6th	
Men's	2023 Indoor	Newlyn Stephenson	Weight throw	7th	

== See also ==
- Category:Eastern Michigan Eagles men's track and field athletes (22)
- Category:Eastern Michigan Eagles women's track and field athletes (7)
