= Bowen Field House =

Multi-purpose arena at Eastern Michigan University

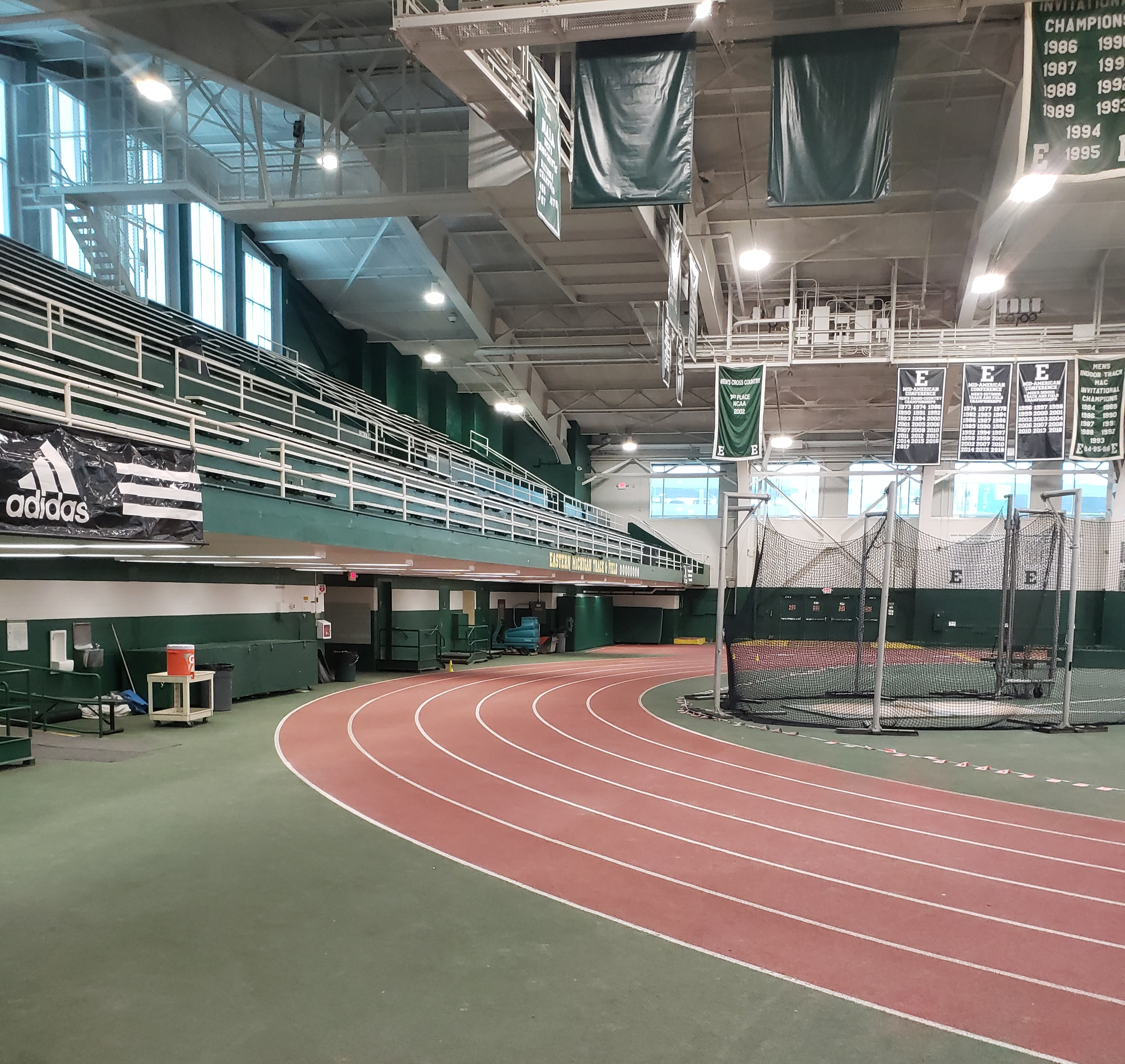
- Interior view in January 2019
- Interactive map of Bowen Field House
- Address: Ypsilanti, Michigan; United States
- Coordinates: 42.250020°N 83.625940°W
- Owner: EMU
- Operator: EMU Athletics
- Capacity: 6,000
- Type: Arena
- Current use: Track and field Wrestling

Construction
- Opened: 1955; 71 years ago
- Expanded: 1982
- Cost: $1.25 million ($15 million in 2025 dollars)

Tenants
- Eastern Michigan Eagles (NCAA) teams: track and field; gymnastics; wrestling (1956–2018); men's basketball (1955–1997); women's basketball (1977–1997)

Website
- emueagles.com/bowen-field-house

Bowen Field House is a 6,000-seat multi-purpose arena in Ypsilanti, Michigan on the Eastern Michigan University campus. It opened in 1955 and was home to the Eastern Michigan Eagles men's and women's basketball teams until the Convocation Center opened in 1997. It currently serves as the home of Eastern Michigan Eagles track and field, Eastern Michigan Eagles wrestling, and Eastern Michigan Eagles gymnastics.

== Overview ==
The last regular season basketball game at the Field House was against the University of Toledo on February 25, 1998, though EMU hosted Toledo again three days later in the Field House in the opening round of the Mid-American Conference tournament that year. EMU brought basketball back to the Field House in November 2013, where the men's team played local rival Concordia University as well as Robert Morris, while the women's team hosted Butler.

On December 4, 1995, during halftime of a basketball game against San Francisco State, more than 50 EMU students took the court for an hour to protest the arrest a month earlier of a black student by a white police officer at a residence hall. Approximately 1,300 spectators were ushered out of the Field House, and the second half of the game was played in the empty arena.

On Thursday, October 31, 1996, President Bill Clinton used a conference on women and business and a speech at the Field House to announce the expansion of a Small Business Administration program to help women.
