= Athletics at the 1984 Summer Olympics – Men's 800 metres =

Men's 800 metres at the Games of the XXIII Olympiad
- Venue: Los Angeles Memorial Coliseum
- Dates: 3 August 1984 (heats); 4 August 1984 (quarter-finals); 5 August 1984 (semi-finals); 6 August 1984 (final)
- Competitors: 69 from 55 nations
- Winning time: 1:43.00 OR

Medalists
1st place, gold medalist(s)		Joaquim Cruz; Brazil
2nd place, silver medalist(s)		Sebastian Coe; Great Britain
3rd place, bronze medalist(s)		Earl Jones; United States

The men's 800 metres event at the 1984 Summer Olympics in Los Angeles took place between 3 and 6 August. Sixty-nine athletes from 55 nations competed. The maximum number of athletes per nation had been set at 3 since the 1930 Olympic Congress. The event was won by 0.64 seconds by Joaquim Cruz of Brazil, the nation's first medal in the men's 800 metres. Sebastian Coe of Great Britain repeated his silver-medal performance from 1980, the eighth man to win two medals in the event.

== Summary ==
With four notable front runners in the race the battle to the break was important. Edwin Koech on the far outside and Joaquim Cruz went out hard around the first turn, with Earl Jones and Johnny Gray to the inside. Cruz, Jones and Gray converged at the same spot, Gray getting the short end of the stick and suddenly losing ground to the back of the field, then Koech converged from the outside, closing the door on Cruz and Jones, with Cruz edging ahead of Jones as contact was made causing Cruz to jump 200 metres into the race. The lead group was marked by British rivals, defending champion Steve Ovett and world record holder Sebastian Coe. They held that order through the next 200 metres, only upset by Gray long striding along the outside up to Coe's shoulder. Gray's added speed seemed to force the leaders to run faster to stay ahead of him, while Ovett withered out the back of the field. With 200 to go Gray seemed to tighten up, frustrated that his hard effort only netted him fifth place. Through the turn, Cruz inched closer to Koech, still marked by Coe and Jones. When Cruz pounced coming off the turn, Koech wilted, outside of him Coe and Jones were in a shoulder to shoulder sprint battle. Cruz had won the war, sprinting away to a clear 5 metre victory. Coe was able to make a slight gain on Jones to take silver. Jones still held off a late charge by Billy Konchellah for bronze.

== Background ==
This was the 20th appearance of the event, which is one of 12 athletics events to have been held at every Summer Olympics. Three of the top four men from 1980 returned: gold medalist Steve Ovett and silver medalist Sebastian Coe of Great Britain, as well as fourth-place finisher Agberto Guimarães of Brazil. Coe (the world record holder) was a favorite, along with Guimarães's countryman Joaquim Cruz. Ovett had a respiratory illness and, while still strong in the event, was not at peak power.

Of the 55 nations represented, 20 had never had a competitor in the men's 800 metres before: Antigua and Barbuda, the British Virgin Islands, Ecuador, Equatorial Guinea, the Gambia, Grenada, Jordan, Mozambique, Nepal, Niger, Oman, Paraguay, Rwanda, San Marino, the Seychelles, the Solomon Islands, Swaziland, the United Arab Emirates, North Yemen, and Zimbabwe all appeared in the event for the first time. Great Britain made its 19th appearance, most among all nations, having had no competitors in the event only in the 1904 Games in St. Louis.

== Competition format ==
For only the second time, the 800 metres was run over four rounds (the first was in 1960); the number of runners had increased to 69 from 41 in 1980. The "fastest loser" system introduced in 1964 was used for the first round. There were nine first-round heats, each with 7 or 8 athletes; the top three runners in each heat as well as the next five fastest overall advanced to the semifinals. There were four quarterfinals, each of 8 athletes; the top four runners in each advanced to the semifinals. There were two semifinals with 8 athletes each; the top four runners in each semifinal advanced to the eight-man final.

== Records ==
Prior to the competition, the existing World and Olympic records were as follows.

World record	Sebastian Coe (GBR)	1:41.73	Florence, Italy	10 June 1981
Olympic record	Alberto Juantorena (CUB)	1:43.50	Montreal, Canada	25 July 1976

In the final Joaquim Cruz set a new Olympic record at 1:43.00.

== Schedule ==
All times are Pacific Daylight Time (UTC−7)

Date	Time	Round
Friday, 3 August 1984	16:40	Round 1
Saturday, 4 August 1984	17:40	Quarterfinals
Sunday, 5 August 1984	18:05	Semifinals
Monday, 6 August 1984	17:50	Final

== Results ==
=== Round 1 ===
Rank	Heat	Athlete	Nation	Time	Notes
1	5	Joaquim Cruz	Brazil	1:45.66	Q
2	2	Sebastian Coe	Great Britain	1:45.71	Q
3	2	Omer Khalifa	Sudan	1:45.81	Q
4	2	Colomán Trabado	Spain	1:46.00	Q
5	2	Riccardo Materazzi	Italy	1:46.03	q
6	9	Billy Konchellah	Kenya	1:46.27	Q
7	5	Steve Ovett	Great Britain	1:46.66	Q
8	8	Juma Ndiwa	Kenya	1:46.73	Q
9	2	Marcus O'Sullivan	Ireland	1:46.85	q
10	8	William Wuycke	Venezuela	1:46.88	Q
11	1	Babacar Niang	Senegal	1:46.90	Q
12	1	Abdi Bile	Somalia	1:46.92	Q
13	3	Owen Hamilton	Jamaica	1:46.95	Q
14	9	Peter Elliott	Great Britain	1:46.98	Q
15	1	Donato Sabia	Italy	1:47.04	Q
16	7	Edwin Koech	Kenya	1:47.11	Q
17	9	José Luíz Barbosa	Brazil	1:47.12	Q
18	6	Johnny Gray	United States	1:47.19	Q
19	8	Mohamed Alouini	Tunisia	1:47.20	Q
20	6	Pat Scammell	Australia	1:47.24	Q
21	1	Sotirios Moutsanas	Greece	1:47.32	q
22	6	Marco Mayr	Switzerland	1:47.36	Q
23	6	Ahmed Belkessam	Algeria	1:47.51	q
24	7	Hans-Peter Ferner	West Germany	1:47.55	Q
25	9	Bruce Roberts	Canada	1:47.56	q
26	5	Oslen Barr	Guyana	1:47.65	Q
27	7	Agberto Guimarães	Brazil	1:47.72	Q
28	8	Simon Hoogewerf	Canada	1:47.74	
29	4	Earl Jones	United States	1:47.75	Q
30	4	Faouzi Lahbi	Morocco	1:47.81	Q
31	7	Mark Handelsman	Israel	1:47.90	
32	3	Moussa Fall	Senegal	1:47.91	Q
33	3	John Marshall	United States	1:47.99	Q
34	5	Benjamín González	Spain	1:48.01	
35	4	Philippe Dupont	France	1:48.09	Q
36	1	Joseph Ramotshabi	Botswana	1:48.17	
37	5	Batulamai Rajakumar	Malaysia	1:48.19	
38	3	Jama Aden	Somalia	1:48.64	
39	2	Archfell Musango	Zambia	1:48.84	
40	4	Axel Harries	West Germany	1:48.92	
41	8	Taplumanei Jonga	Zimbabwe	1:49.59	
42	3	Peter Pearless	New Zealand	1:49.95	
43	5	Isaac Ganunga	Malawi	1:51.25	
44	6	Meesaq Rizvi	Pakistan	1:51.29	
45	9	Charles Borromeo	India	1:51.52	
46	9	Dale Jones	Antigua and Barbuda	1:51.52	
47	1	André Titos	Mozambique	1:51.73	
48	5	Francisco Figueredo	Paraguay	1:52.22	
49	1	Samuel Sawny	Grenada	1:53.08	
50	8	Charlie Oliver	Solomon Islands	1:53.22	
51	7	Jerry Molyneaux	British Virgin Islands	1:53.23	
52	7	Jean-Marie Rudasingwa	Rwanda	1:53.23	
53	5	Siegfried Cruden	Suriname	1:53.31	
54	4	Mouteb Al-Faouri	Jordan	1:53.89	
55	2	Leopoldo Acosta	Ecuador	1:54.06	
56	3	Alberto López	Guatemala	1:54.19	
57	6	William Amakye	Ghana	1:54.80	
58	4	Ibrahim Aziz	United Arab Emirates	1:54.86	
59	9	Peter Ceesay	The Gambia	1:55.35	
60	9	Ousman Miangoto	Chad	1:56.02	
61	1	Jodha Gurung	Nepal	1:56.72	
62	2	Manlio Molinari	San Marino	1:57.09	
63	8	Barakat Al-Sharji	Oman	2:00.38	
64	6	Philip Sinon	Seychelles	2:04.89	
65	8	Abdul Al-Ghadi	North Yemen	2:05.90	
66	7	Bartolomé Esono Asumu	Equatorial Guinea	2:17.29	
—	3	Vusie Dlamini	Swaziland	DSQ	
—	4	Kim Bok-joo	South Korea	DSQ	
—	7	Moussa Daweye	Niger	DSQ	

=== Quarterfinals ===
==== Quarterfinal 1 ====
Rank	Athlete	Nation	Time	Notes
1	Edwin Koech	Kenya	1:44.74	Q
2	Donato Sabia	Italy	1:44.90	Q
3	Agberto Guimarães	Brazil	1:45.18	Q
4	Peter Elliott	Great Britain	1:45.49	Q
5	Faouzi Lahbi	Morocco	1:45.67	
6	Babacar Niang	Senegal	1:45.71	
7	Sotirios Moutsanas	Greece	1:46.34	
—	Colomán Trabado	Spain	DNF	

==== Quarterfinal 2 ====
Rank	Athlete	Nation	Time	Notes
1	Billy Konchellah	Kenya	1:46.15	Q
2	Omar Khalifa	Sudan	1:46.33	Q
3	Sebastian Coe	Great Britain	1:46.75	Q
4	José Luíz Barbosa	Brazil	1:46.87	Q
5	John Marshall	United States	1:47.18	
6	Riccardo Materazzi	Italy	1:47.90	
7	Ahmed Belkessam	Algeria	1:48.11	
8	Marco Mayr	Switzerland	1:48.30	

==== Quarterfinal 3 ====
Rank	Athlete	Nation	Time	Notes
1	Joaquim Cruz	Brazil	1:44.84	Q
2	Steve Ovett	Great Britain	1:45.72	Q
3	Johnny Gray	United States	1:45.82	Q
4	William Wuycke	Venezuela	1:46.17	Q
5	Abdi Bile	Somalia	1:46.49	
6	Owen Hamilton	Jamaica	1:46.74	
7	Pat Scammel	Australia	1:47.90	
8	Bruce Roberts	Canada	1:49.72	

==== Quarterfinal 4 ====
Rank	Athlete	Nation	Time	Notes
1	Earl Jones	United States	1:45.44	Q
2	Hans-Peter Ferner	West Germany	1:45.52	Q
3	Juma Ndiwa	Kenya	1:45.59	Q
4	Moussa Fall	Senegal	1:45.71	Q
5	Mohamed Alouini	Tunisia	1:45.78	
6	Marcus O'Sullivan	Ireland	1:46.21	
7	Oslen Barr	Guyana	1:46.97	
8	Philippe Dupont	France	1:48.95	

=== Semifinals ===
==== Semifinal 1 ====
Rank	Athlete	Nation	Time	Notes
1	Joaquim Cruz	Brazil	1:43.82	Q
2	Edwin Koech	Kenya	1:44.12	Q
3	Earl Jones	United States	1:44.51	Q
4	Steve Ovett	Great Britain	1:44.81	Q
5	Omar Khalifa	Sudan	1:44.87	
6	Moussa Fall	Senegal	1:45.03	
7	William Wuycke	Venezuela	1:47.32	
—	Peter Elliott	Great Britain	DNF	

==== Semifinal 2 ====
Rank	Athlete	Nation	Time	Notes
1	Sebastian Coe	Great Britain	1:45.51	Q
2	Billy Konchellah	Kenya	1:45.67	Q
3	Johnny Gray	United States	1:45.82	Q
4	Donato Sabia	Italy	1:45.96	Q
5	Hans-Peter Ferner	West Germany	1:46.16	
6	Agberto Guimarães	Brazil	1:46.65	
7	Juma Ndiwa	Kenya	1:48.06	
8	José Luíz Barbosa	Brazil	1:48.70	

=== Final ===
Rank	Athlete	Nation	Time	Notes
1st place, gold medalist(s)	Joaquim Cruz	Brazil	1:43.00	OR
2nd place, silver medalist(s)	Sebastian Coe	Great Britain	1:43.64	
3rd place, bronze medalist(s)	Earl Jones	United States	1:43.83	
4	Billy Konchellah	Kenya	1:44.03	
5	Donato Sabia	Italy	1:44.53	
6	Edwin Koech	Kenya	1:44.86	
7	Johnny Gray	United States	1:47.89	
8	Steve Ovett	Great Britain	1:52.28	

== See also ==
- 1982 Men's European Championships 800 metres (Athens)
- 1983 Men's World Championships 800 metres (Helsinki)
- 1984 Men's Friendship Games 800 metres (Moscow)
- 1986 Men's European Championships 800 metres (Stuttgart)
