= Chuck Wilson (sprinter) =

American sprinter

Personal information
- Born: June 5, 1968 (age 58) Detroit, Michigan, United States

Sport
- Sport: Track and field
Medal record
Representing United States
Summer Universiade
Gold medal – first place	1991 Sheffield	4x400 m relay

Chuck Wilson (born June 5, 1968) is an American retired sprinter.

Wilson attended Benedictine High School in Detroit, Michigan.

Wilson ran for the Eastern Michigan Eagles track and field team from 1988 to 1992. He was first an All-American at the 1988 NCAA Division I Outdoor Track and Field Championships, running on the 5th-place 4 × 400 m team.

Wilson qualified for the individual 400 m at the 1990 NCAA Division I Outdoor Track and Field Championships but placed 6th in his semi-final and did not advance.

In 1991, Wilson placed 3rd in the 400 m at the 1991 NCAA Division I Indoor Track and Field Championships and 1991 NCAA Division I Outdoor Track and Field Championships. He qualified for the 4 × 400 m relay at the 1991 World University Games, where he led off the winning U.S. team to the gold medal in 3:03.65 minutes.

In 2008, Wilson was inducted into the Eastern Michigan Eagles hall of fame.
