= Jordan Desilets =

American steeplechase runner (born 1980)

Personal information
- Born: 5 December 1980
- Height: 175 cm (5 ft 9 in)
- Weight: 64 kg (141 lb)

Sport
- Country: United States
- Sport: Athletics
- Events: 3000 meters steeplechase Marathon

Achievements and titles
- Personal best: 3000 m s'chase: 8:24.62 (2004)
Medal record
Men's athletics
Representing the United States
NACAC Under-25 Championships
Gold medal – first place	2002 San Antonio	3000 m s'chase

Jordan Desilets (born December 5, 1980) is an American steeplechase and long-distance runner. Representing the Eastern Michigan Eagles track and field team, he won the 3000 meters steeplechase at the 2004 NCAA Division I Outdoor Track and Field Championships. Earlier, he won a gold medal in the steeplechase at the 2002 NACAC Under-25 Championships in Athletics. He later transitioned to the marathon, winning the 2010 Detroit Free Press Marathon.

== Career ==
Desilets competed for Lake Orion High School in Michigan. He was Michigan High School Athletic Association cross country state runner-up in 1997 and took third place in 1998.

From 1999 to 2004, Desilets ran for the Eastern Michigan Eagles track and field team. He was runner-up in the 2001 Mid-American Conference steeplechase and won the 2002 Penn Relays steeplechase, becoming the second athlete from Eastern Michigan to win a Penn Relays race. He finished 5th in the steeplechase at the 2002 NCAA Division I Outdoor Track and Field Championships and went on to compete at the 2002 USA Outdoor Track and Field Championships, placing 13th in the finals. He qualified to represent the United States at the 2002 NACAC Under-25 Championships in Athletics, winning the gold medal in the steeplechase.

The following year, Desilets was runner-up in the steeplechase at the 2003 NCAA Division I Outdoor Track and Field Championships in a personal record time of 8:29.44. He finished 6th in the 3000 m steeplechase at the 2003 USA Outdoor Track and Field Championships.

In 2004, Desilets broke the four-minute mile barrier at the Meyo Invitational, running 3:59.83 on an oversized indoor track. He finished 7th in the mile at the 2004 NCAA Division I Indoor Track and Field Championships. Outdoors, Desilets won his first national title in the steeplechase at the 2004 NCAA Division I Outdoor Track and Field Championships. He ran at the 2004 United States Olympic trials but failed to make the team, placing 6th in the finals. Following his performance, he said his next goal was to make the U.S. team at the 2008 Olympics.

Desilets placed 25th in the 4 km race at the 2005 USA Cross Country Championships, and he qualified for but did not start the steeplechase at the 2005 USA Outdoor Track and Field Championships. At the 2006 USA Outdoor Track and Field Championships, he qualified for the steeplechase finals but again did not start. At his second Olympic qualification attempt at the 2008 United States Olympic trials, Desilets finished 8th in the finals and did not make the U.S. team.

Desilets won his marathon debut at the 2010 Detroit Free Press Marathon, running 2:28:30 and winning a US$1,500 prize. He was 54th at the 2013 Chicago Marathon.

== Personal life ==
Desilets is from Pinckney, Michigan and lived in Brighton, Michigan in preparation for his Boston Marathon debut. He worked for running website RunSignup.

In 2018, Desilets was inducted into the Eastern Michigan Eagles hall of fame.
