= Eagle Crest Resort (Ypsilanti, Michigan) =

Resort

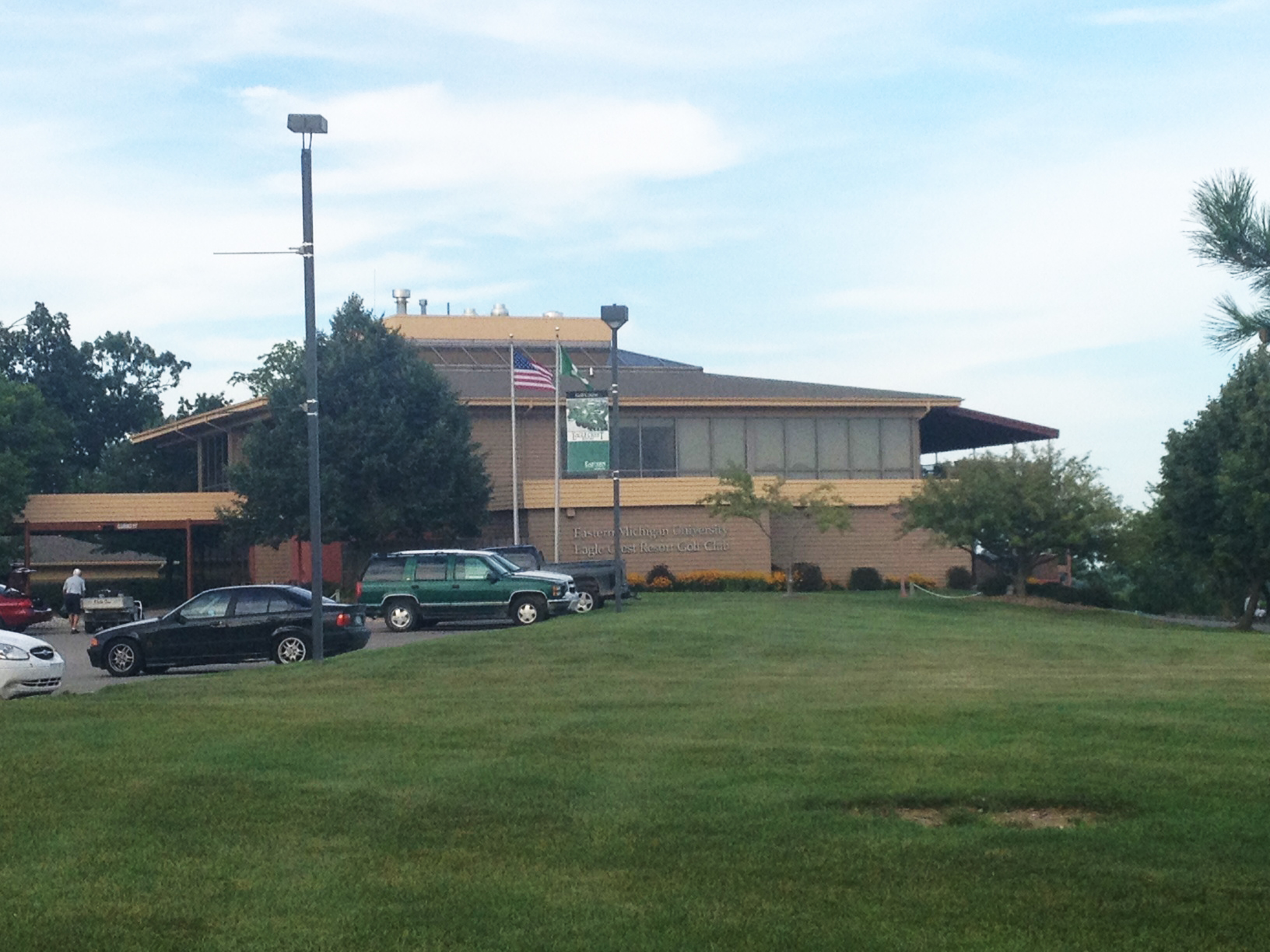
- Eagle Crest golf course facing Ford Lake
- Interactive map of Eagle Crest Resort
- 42°13′28.236″N 83°36′46.5768″W

Club information
- Location: 1275 S Huron St; Ypsilanti, Michigan, United States
- Established: 1989
- Owner: Eastern Michigan University
- Total holes: 18
- Website: Eagle Crest Resort

Eagle Crest Golf Course
- Designed by: Karl V. Litten
- Par: 72
- Length: 6750 yards

Eagle Crest Resort is located in Ypsilanti, Michigan, located in the southeast part of the state. The resort consists of the Ann Arbor Marriott Ypsilanti at Eagle Crest, Eastern Michigan University's Eagle Crest Conference Center and Eagle Crest Golf Club. The facility was built in 1989. In 2006, Golf Digest gave the golf course a 4 out of 5 star rating.

== Facility ==
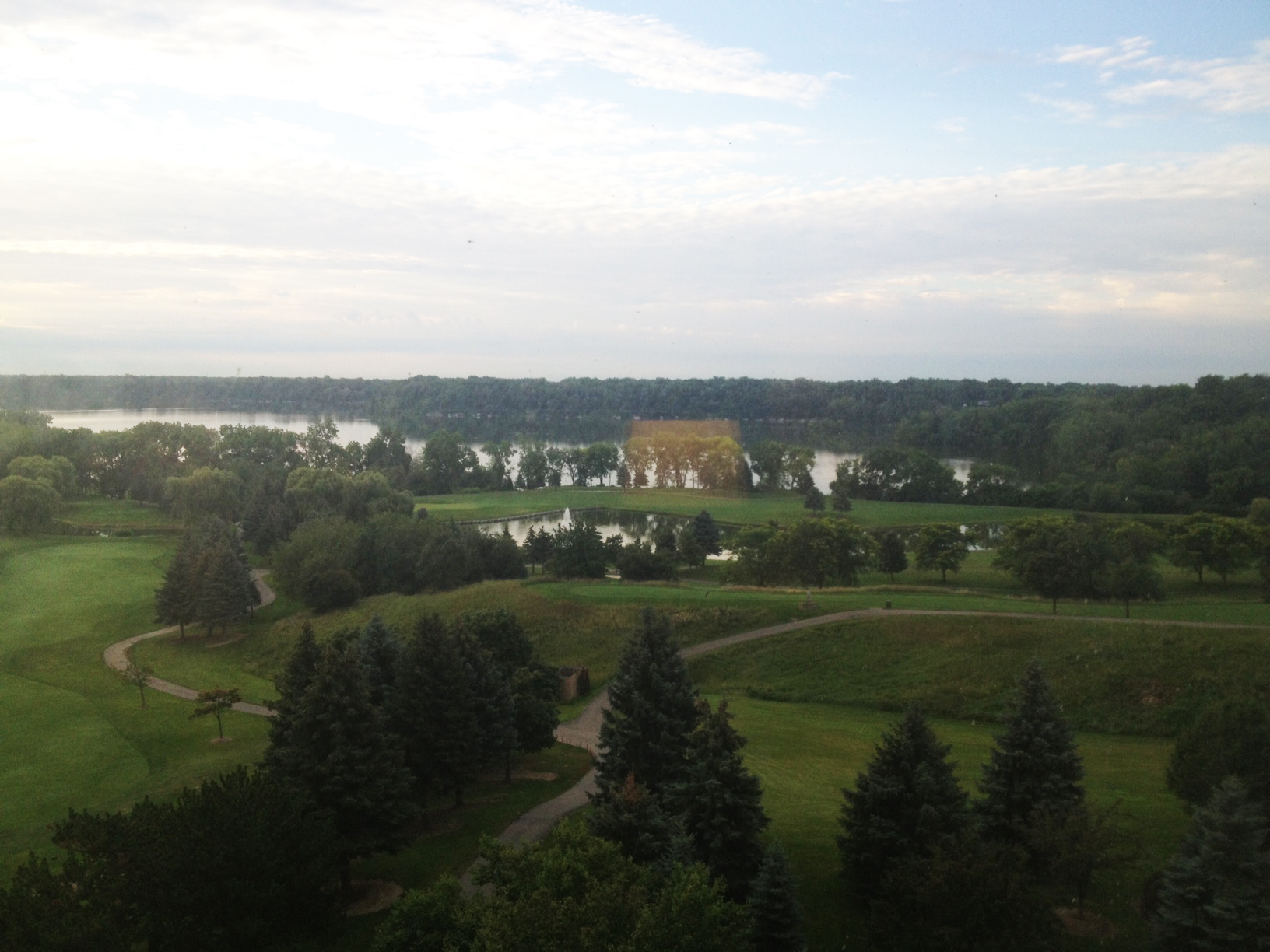
Eagle Crest Golf Resort In Ypsilanti Michigan

The resort is 137 acres located adjacent to Ford Lake. The resort is just off Interstate 94 in Ypsilanti. The facility was built in 1989 and is designed by Karl V. Litten. The facility is broken down into three parts hotel, conference center and a golf course. The facility also has a jogging trail and tennis courts. The tennis courts is used by Eastern Michigan Woman's Tennis. As well, the golf course is home to EMU Men's and Women's Golf. The conference center is owned by Eastern Michigan University has 27,000 square feet (2,500 m^{2}) of meeting space. The resort is also part of the International Association of Conference Centers, IACC.

== Hotel ==
The hotel has 235 rooms. The hotel is not run by Eastern Michigan University but by Marriott International. The hotel's name is The Ann Arbor Marriott Ypsilanti at Eagle Crest. The hotel went through a multimillion-dollar renovation in 2008.

== Golf Course ==
The 18-hole course is 6,750 yards total in length and is a par 72 course. The course has a parkland style and a bent fairway grass. The course is only open between March and November. In 2006, the course was given a 4 star rating out of 5 by Golf Digest.

== See also ==
- Eastern Michigan Eagles
