= Fabian Rollins =

Barbadian sprinter

Personal information
- Nationality: Barbadian
- Born: 4 January 1976 (age 50)

Sport
- Sport: Sprinting
- Event: 400 metres

Fabian Rollins (born 4 January 1976) is a Barbadian sprinter. He competed in the men's 400 metres at the 2000 Summer Olympics.

Rollins was an All-American sprinter for the Eastern Michigan Eagles track and field team, finishing 6th in the 400 m at the 1998 NCAA Division I Indoor Track and Field Championships.

== Personal life ==
Rollins has three American-born daughters: Kayla, a footballer who was called up to the Argentina national team, and Maya, an athlete who represents Barbabos, and Olivia, a high school senior and field hockey player who is committed to the University of Vermont.
