= Marco Mayr =

Swiss middle-distance runner

Personal information
- Nationality: Swiss
- Born: 19 July 1960 (age 65)

Sport
- Sport: Middle-distance running
- Event: 800 metres

Marco Mayr (born 19 July 1960) is a Swiss middle-distance runner. He competed in the men's 800 metres at the 1984 Summer Olympics.
