= William Amakye =

Ghanaian middle-distance runner

Personal information
- Nationality: Ghanaian
- Born: 25 September 1958 (age 67)

Sport
- Sport: Middle-distance running
- Event: 800 metres

Wilson "William" Amakye (born 25 September 1958) is a Ghanaian middle-distance runner. He competed in the men's 800 metres at the 1984 Summer Olympics.
