= Bruce Roberts (runner) =

Canadian middle-distance runner

Personal information
- Nationality: Canadian
- Born: 3 November 1957 (age 67)

Sport
- Sport: Middle-distance running
- Event: 800 metres

Bruce Roberts (born 3 November 1957) is a Canadian middle-distance runner. He competed in the men's 800 metres at the 1984 Summer Olympics.
