= Samuel Sawny =

Grenadian runner

Personal information
- Nationality: Grenadian

Sport
- Country: Grenada
- Sport: Middle-distance running
- Event: 800 metres

Achievements and titles
- Personal best: 800 m: 1:53.08 s (1984)

Samuel Sawny is a retired Grenadian middle-distance runner who represented his country at the 1984 Summer Olympics in the men's 800 metres.
