= Eastern Michigan Eagles =

Sports teams for Eastern Michigan University

- University: Eastern Michigan University
- Nickname: Eagles
- NCAA: Division I (FBS)
- Conference: Mid-American (primary)
- Athletic director: Scott Wetherbee
- Location: Ypsilanti, Michigan
- Varsity teams: 19
- Football stadium: Rynearson Stadium
- Basketball arena: George Gervin GameAbove Center
- Baseball stadium: Oestrike Stadium
- Aquatics center: Jones Natatorium
- Other venues: Bowen Field House
- Colors: Green and white
- Mascot: Swoop
- Fight song: Eagles Fight Song
- Website: emueagles.com

The Eastern Michigan Eagles, formerly known as the Normalites and the Hurons, are the athletic teams for Eastern Michigan University (EMU) in Ypsilanti, Michigan, United States. The Eagles compete in the National Collegiate Athletic Association (NCAA) at the Division I level as members of the Mid-American Conference (MAC). Altogether, the Eagles have won three NCAA Division II national championships and 13 NAIA Division I national championships in five different sports (baseball, men's cross country, men's swimming and diving, men's indoor track and field, and men's outdoor track and field); moreover, EMU has been NCAA Division I national runner-up twice. In 1940, the men's cross country team finished second to Indiana University at the national meet hosted by Michigan State University.

The Eagles have also won the Reese Trophy, given to the best overall men's athletic program in the MAC, five times, most recently in 2018. EMU was a member of the Illinois Intercollegiate Athletic Conference from 1950 to 1961, and has been a member of the MAC since 1971.

== History ==
The university was founded in 1849 as Michigan State Normal School. It wasn't until the school was Michigan State Normal College when the school's first nicknames (then Michigan State Normal College), were the "Normalites" and "Men from Ypsi". The "Hurons" first came into being as the result of a contest sponsored by the Men's Union in 1929. On Oct. 31 of that year, a three-person committee, composed of Dr. Clyde Ford, Dr. Elmer Lyman and Professor Bert Peet, selected the name "Hurons" from the many entries in the contest. The name was submitted by two students, Gretchen Borst and George Hanner. The runner-up name in that contest was Pioneers. The "Hurons" was adopted in 1929. In 1959, the school's name was changed to Eastern Michigan University. EMU was a member of the Illinois Intercollegiate Athletic Conference from 1950 to 1961, and eventually joined the Mid-American Conference in 1971. The university switched from NCAA Division II to NCAA Division I athletics in the mid-1970s. Since the 1991 season, Eastern Michigan University athletic teams have gone by the nickname "Eagles".

Since joining the Mid-American Conference in 1971, Eastern's most successful athletics programs in men's sports include: cross country with over 17 MAC titles, indoor track & field with 12 MAC titles, outdoor track & field with over 20 MAC titles and men's swimming & diving with over 30 MAC titles. The more successful sports in women's athletics include outdoor track & field with over 10 MAC titles and indoor track & field with 3 MAC titles.

EMU football made two appearances in NCAA (football) bowl games during the 20th century: the 1971 Pioneer Bowl and th 1987 California Bowl, losing the former and winning the latter. This century, the team first appeared in the 2016 Bahamas Bowl, followed by multiple additional bowl appearances.

Eastern's men's basketball team has appeared in four NCAA Division I tournaments. They reached the Sweet Sixteen in the 1991 and in 1996 they beat Duke in first round. As well, men's basketball reached the Final Four of the 1972 NCAA College Division National Championship and were national runners up in 1976.

On March 20, 2018, EMU announced the elimination of four sports: Wrestling, softball, men's swimming and diving, and women's tennis. Despite the dismal record over the years, football was not considered for elimination. NCAA Football Bowl Subdivision regulations mandate that each member school must field at least 16 varsity sports and the Mid-American Conference mandates football for its members. Despite a court order to restart the softball team to satisfy a Title IX dispute, EMU stated a preference to add women's lacrosse, citing costs compared to softball as well as growing youth participation numbers for lacrosse. In November 2019, EMU officially announced the addition of women's lacrosse. The news coincided with the news of the MAC beginning sponsorship of the sport in 2021. EMU will join five other MAC members fielding women's lacrosse for the conference's second season in 2022.

=== Huron to Eagles ===
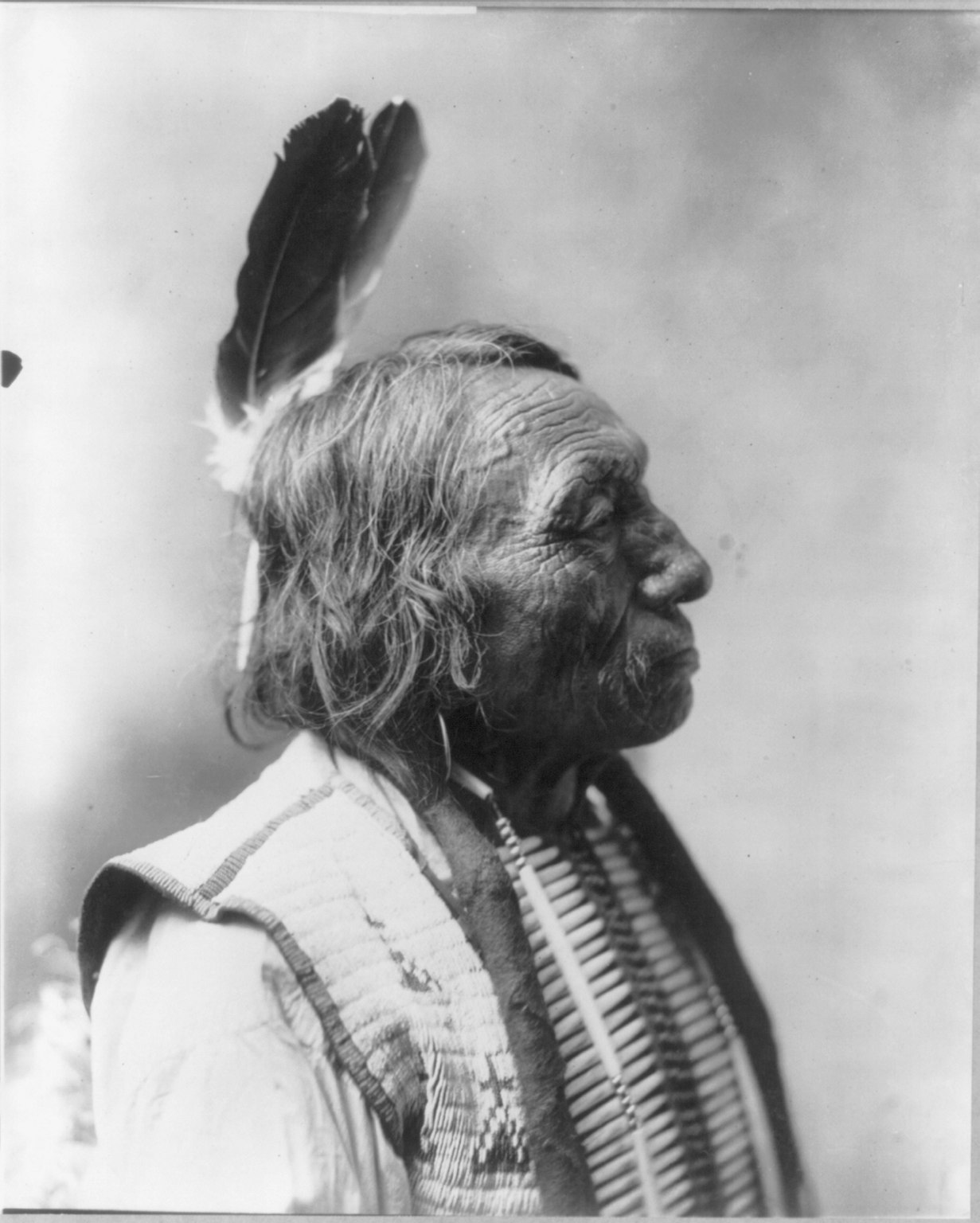
Depiction of native Americans in logos and names of athletic teams were accused of promoting racial stereotypes so the University dropped the "Huron" logo

EMU began investigating the appropriateness of its Huron Indian logo after the Michigan Department of Civil Rights issued a report in October 1988 suggesting that all schools using such logos drop them. The report claimed that the use of Native American names, logos or mascots for athletic teams promoted racial stereotypes. At that time, four colleges, 62 high schools and 33 junior high/middle schools in Michigan used Native American logos or names, including Mid-American Conference rival Central Michigan University. CMU did not, however, change their nickname from the Chippewas. The EMU Board of Regents voted to replace the Huron name with Eagles, taken from three recommendations from a committee charged with supplying a new nickname. The other two final names submitted were Green Hornets and Express. The Eagles name was officially adopted on May 22, 1991, when the EMU Board of Regents voted to replace the existing Huron nickname and logo with the new one. During the 1991 NCAA Men's Division I Basketball Tournament, announcer Jim Nantz talked about the controversy and referred to the team on-air as the "No-Names."

Some former students and faculty were angered that a unique name like Huron was replaced by something common like Eagles, especially for reasons of political correctness relating to Native American names, logos or mascots depicting a Native American. Early French explorers referred to these natives as the Huron, either from the French huron ("ruffian", "rustic"), or from hure ("boar's head"). According to tradition, French sailors thought that the bristly hairstyle of Wendat warriors resembled that of a boar. But these negative etymological meanings conflict with the "bon Iroquois" attitude held by the French fur traders and explorers. An alternate etymology is from the Algonquin words ronon ("nation"), or Irri-ronon ("Erie" or "Cat Nation"). It was pronounced Hirri-ronon by the French, eventually shortened to Hirr-on, and finally spelled in its present form, Huron. Other etymological possibilities come from the Algonquin words ka-ron and tu-ron ("straight coast" and "crooked coast").

Some alumni have refused to donate money to the school. The name change spurred an official chapter of the EMU Alumni Association, the Huron Restoration Chapter. The chapter claims to have the support of Chief Leaford Bearskin of the Wyandot Tribe of Oklahoma and former Grand Chief Max Gros-Louis of the Huron-Wendat Nation of Quebec to reestablish the team name as Huron. Since the change, the university has not altered the name and has continued to adopt the Eagle name. In 1994, the university adopted a new mascot called "Swoop". In 2011, EMU began its True EMU Campaign which aimed to unite all alumni stating "Whether you are a Huron or an Eagle, whether you graduated 50 years ago or last semester, we want you to show the world you remember your times in Y-Town, water tower and all."

== Facilities ==
EMU Athletics oversees and uses several facilities on the EMU campus such as the George Gervin GameAbove Center, Bowen Field House, Eagle Crest Resort (Ypsilanti, Michigan), the Indoor Practice Facility (the bubble), Olds-Robb Rec/IM, Oestrike Stadium and Rynearson Stadium.

Rynearson Stadium opened in 1969 and is the largest facility on the campus. Convocation Center is a multi-purpose arena that opened on December 9, 1998, is the largest indoor facility. Bowen Field House is used by Eastern Michigan Eagles track and field, Eastern Michigan Eagles wrestling, and Eastern Michigan Eagles gymnastics. Oestrike Stadium is used for baseball and softball events. The newest building operated by athletics is the Indoor Practice Facility, which opened in 2010. Six intercollegiate sports use the facility which include football, baseball, softball, women's soccer and men's and women's golf.

== Sponsored sports ==
Eastern Michigan University offers 19 NCAA Division I varsity sports, 7 for men and 12 for women. All sports compete in the MAC — women's rowing had long been an exception, with the Eagles competing in the Coastal Athletic Association through 2024–25, but the MAC added women's rowing as a sponsored sport in 2025–26. EMU will add two more women's sports in 2026–27—flag football, part of the NCAA Emerging Sports for Women program, and lightweight rowing, not sanctioned by the NCAA. Neither is sponsored by the MAC.

Eastern Michigan is a member of the Mid-American Conference

Men's sports	Women's sports
Baseball	Basketball
Basketball	Cross country
Cross country	Flag football (2026–27)
Football	Golf
Golf	Gymnastics
Track and field^{1}	Lacrosse
	Lightweight rowing (2026–27)
	Rowing
	Soccer
	Swimming & diving
	Tennis
	Track and field^{1}
	Volleyball
^{1} – includes both indoor and outdoor.

=== Baseball ===
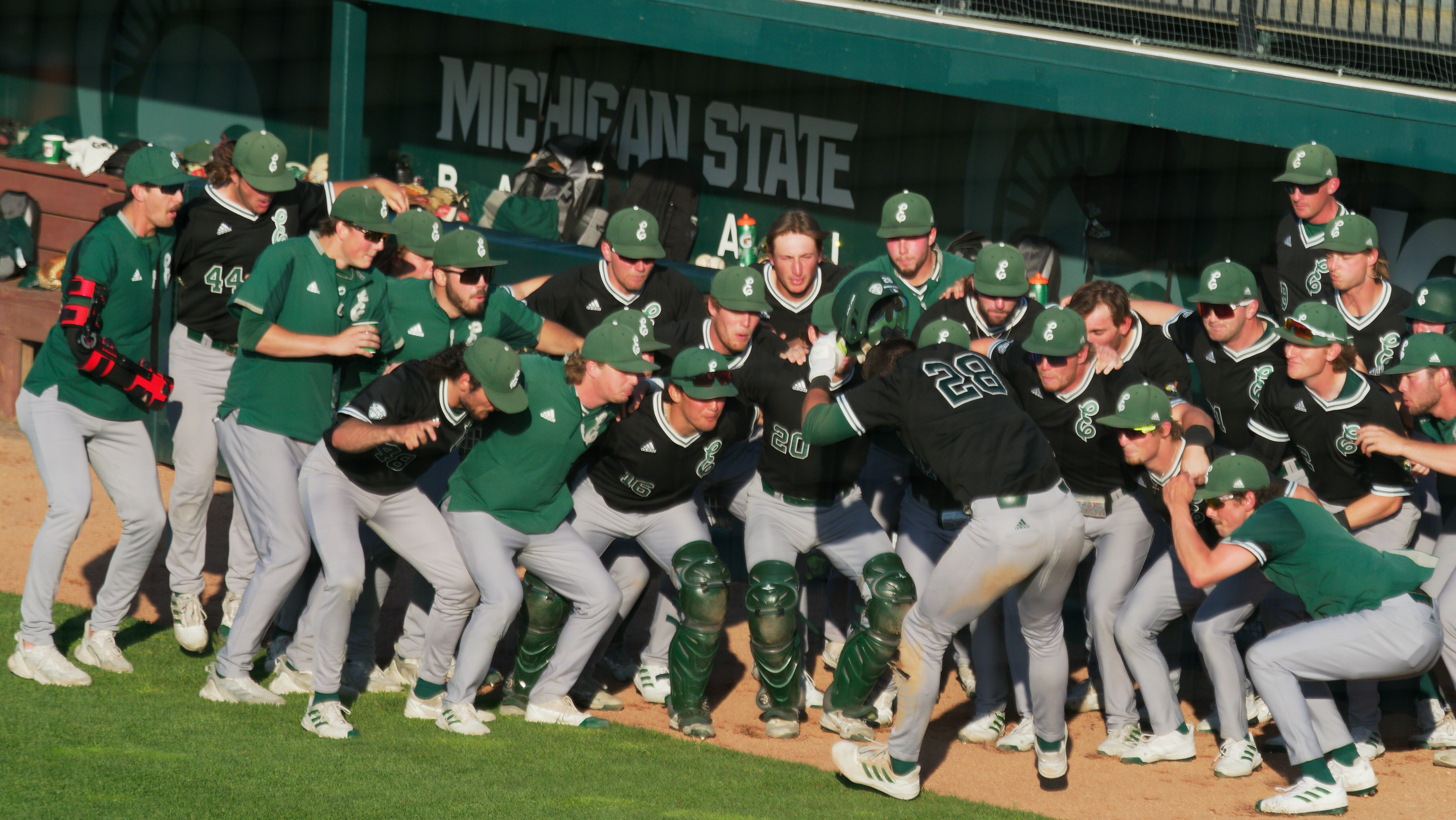
Eagles baseball players celebrate a home run during a 2023 game against Michigan State

On June 19, 1976, after finishing in sixth place the year before, the baseball team was defeated by the University of Arizona in the final game of the College World Series at Johnny Rosenblatt Stadium in Omaha, Nebraska. (As of 2016, EMU remains the last northern school to make it to the NCAA baseball championship game.) Under the leadership of Coach Ron Oestrike and assistant Roger Coryell, the Hurons defeated Maine, Clemson, and Arizona State (with its 13 future Major Leaguers) before losing its last two games to Arizona. EMU was led by stars Bob Owchinko, Bob Welch, Dan Schmitz, Jerry Keller, Glenn Gulliver, Glen Ambrose, Mike Lauerman, Thom Boutin and John Martin.

=== Men's basketball ===
Eastern's men's basketball team has appeared in four NCAA Division I tournaments, and have a 3–4 record, tied for third best among Michigan colleges. They reached the Sweet Sixteen in the 1991 tournament (their first ever appearance) and defeated Duke University in the first round of the 1996 tournament.

One of the great highlights in team history came after the victory over Duke in 1996 when the Blue Devils' Head Coach Mike Krzyzewski stated, "Eastern Michigan is very well coached, much deeper than we are and, today, much quicker than we were."

EMU reached the Final Four of the 1972 NCAA College Division National Championship, led by All-American George Gervin, an NBA Hall of Famer selected as one of the 50 Greatest Players in NBA History. In 1976, the Baseball team was national runners up in NCAA Division I.

=== Women's basketball ===
Eastern's women's basketball team began in the 1977–78 season.

=== Cross country ===
Eastern Michigan Eagles men's cross country is a varsity level sport. The Eagles compete at the Division I level in the NCAA. The men's cross country team has won fourteen team championships. Its current head coach, John Goodridge, has won five MAC championships in his nine years as head coach. The cross country team at the school started in 1911.

=== Football ===
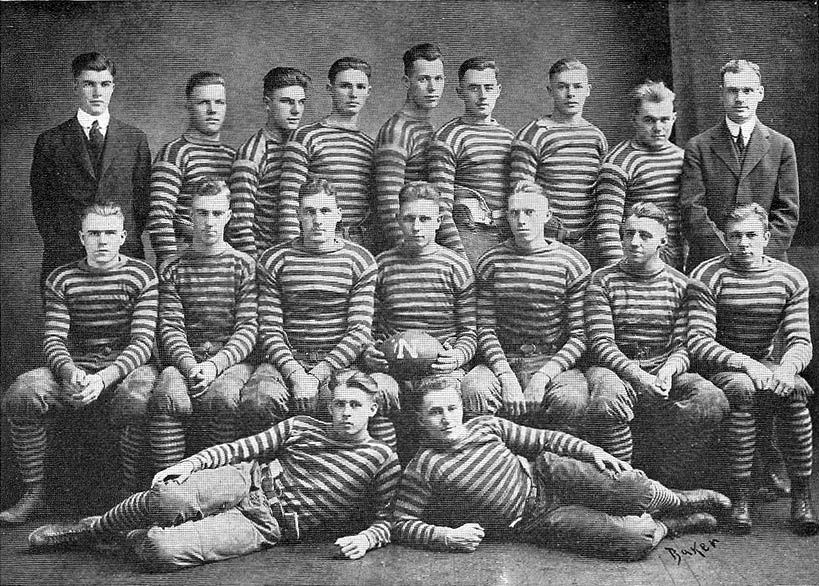
The football team in 1917

The football team played one home game a year at Ford Field in downtown Detroit from 2004 to 2007 in the "Collegiate Clash". They hosted Central Michigan University (2004), Western Michigan University (2005), the United States Naval Academy (2006), and Northwestern University (2007). After winning the first Ford Field game over CMU in triple overtime 61–58, they lost three in a row.

The greatest football victory in EMU history occurred in December 1987. The MAC Champion Hurons defeated 17½ point favorite San Jose State in the California Bowl. The victory culminated a 10–2 season and improbable rise from the depths of Division I-A college football. Only two years previous the team was in serious jeopardy of losing Division I-A status. Head Coach Jim Harkema was instrumental in resurrecting the program. The two losses in 1987 were both on the road, and were by a total of 11 points.

The 1988 and 1989 teams each finished in second place in the conference and ended the most successful stretch of football in school history with its fourth straight winning season.

After a long series of losing records, and finishing the 2015 season with a 1–11 record, they have since appeared in bowl games in 2016, 2018, 2019 and 2021 under head coach Chris Creighton.

=== Women's gymnastics ===
Eastern Michigan Eagles gymnastics is a collegiate women's gymnastics program. Home meets were formally held in Bowen Field House. They are now held in the Convocation Center. Warner Gymnasium is the current home of the EMU Gymnastics Program. Katie Minasola is the head coach for the EMU Gymnastics team with Danielle Weber and Sam Higgins as assistant coaches.

The team consists of 20 girls who all do different routines, skills, and compete at all different levels scoring. They all work together as a team and compete for themselves as well as each other to get the highest scores possible from the 4–8 judges on each event. There are ten to eleven meets per season and are every weekend from the end of January to the end of March. On average there are three to four home meets per season the rest being away meets that can be anywhere from Ohio to California.

The team has ranked repeatedly within the top 15 for team GPA in the nation. In 2008, the Eagles had 11 gymnasts named to the National Association of Collegiate Gymnastics Coaches/Women (NACGC/W) scholar-athlete team. Additionally, the team placed seventh as a team with a Mid-American Conference leading 3.5357 team GPA for the ninth consecutive year. In 2007, the team gained its first MAC title and in 2008 were runners up.

The team won back-to-back MAC titles in 2016 and 2017. Following a COVID-19 impacted 2020 season, the EMU Gymnastics team came back strong to become MAC champions once again in 2021.

=== Swimming and diving ===
The men's swimming and diving team hold the record for the most MAC Championships in a single sport, 31, which they won in Men's Swimming and Diving in 1978, 1980–1996, 1998, 2000–2005, 2007–2012, and 2014.

Women's swimming and diving is one of EMU's more successful women's sports. Women's Swimming and Diving team won MAC titles in 2006 and 2007.

The head coach Peter Linn has been leading the Eagles for 27 years.

=== Track and field ===
Men's Outdoor Track & Field has over 20 MAC titles. Men's Indoor Track & Field has over 13 MAC titles. Women's Outdoor Track & Field has over 10 MAC titles. Women's Indoor Track & Field has 3 MAC titles. Track and field collectively holds the record for most MAC titles out of all the EMU athletics teams.

== Former sports ==
=== Wrestling ===
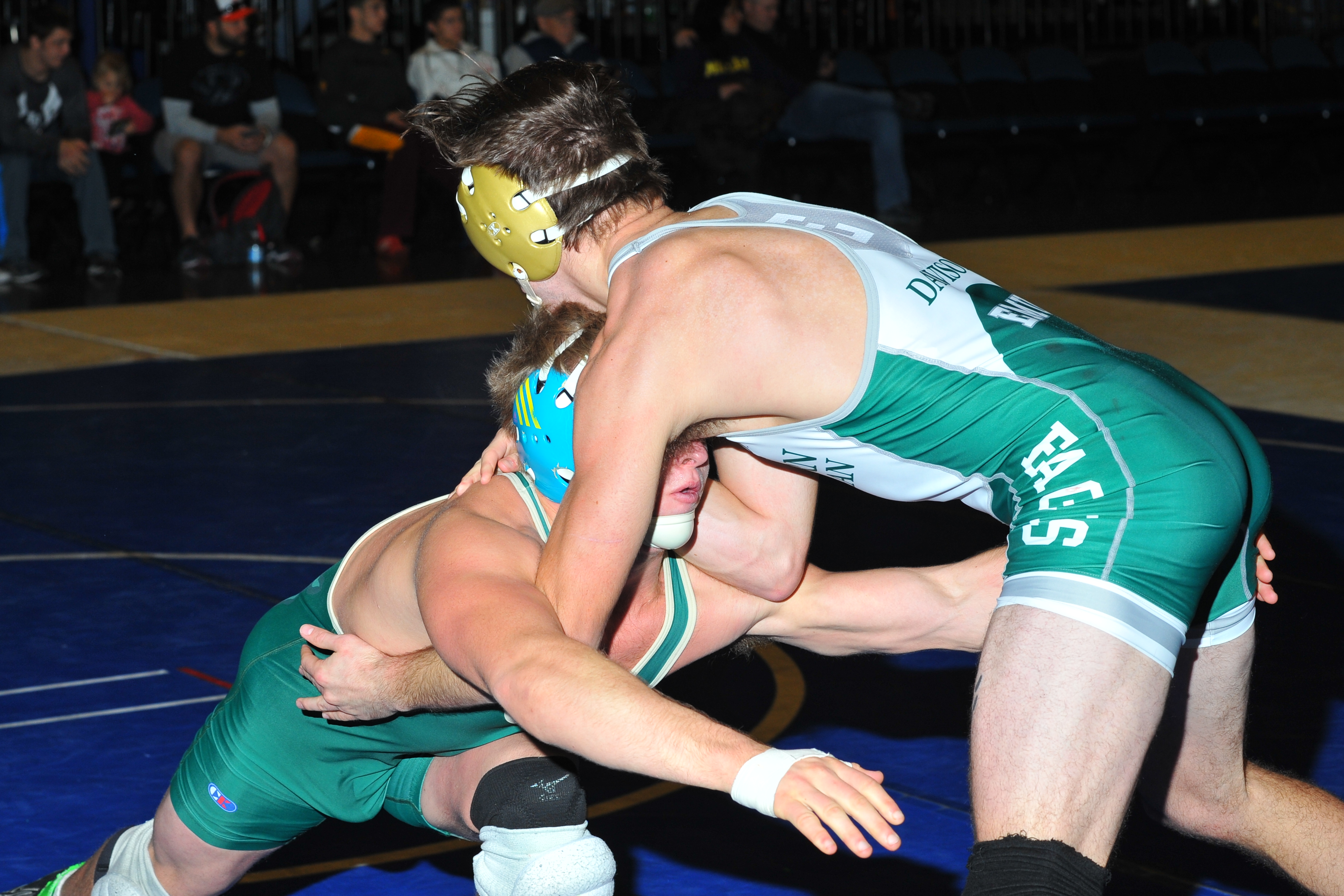
An Eagles wrestler (right) takes on an opponent from Cal Poly in 2015

Eastern Michigan Eagles wrestling team was a men's athletic program. Eastern Michigan adopted the sport of wrestling in 1956. The wrestling program was part of the National Association of Intercollegiate Athletics (NAIA) from 1957 through 1962. In 1963–1966, EMU wrestling switched conferences to the Presidents' Athletic Conference (PAC). Since the exit from the PAC, EMU has been a part of the Mid-American Conference (MAC), starting in 1973. Home meets are held in Bowen Field House.

In 1996, wrestling won its first MAC championship. There are several home dual meets a year and an annually host of the EMU Open. The EMU Open is an annual event started in 1991 that hosts over 500 wrestlers and NCAA schools across all three divisions. The last head coach of the EMU wrestling team was David Bolyard. Bolyard became the new head wrestling coach in 2014. The team has 6 NAIA All-Americans, 5 NCAA Division II All-Americans, and 4 NCAA Division I All-Americans. As well, the team has over 20 MAC champions.

Despite having one of the best seasons in recent history and Sa'Derian Perry as its first All-American since 1999, wrestling was named one of the four sports EMU cut in March 2018, just three days after the wrestling championships. In April 2018, Perry transferred to Old Dominion University with two years of eligibility remaining. As a member of a team whose program was eliminated, Perry would not lose a season of eligibility. EMU head coach Bolyard became an assistant at the University of Michigan.

== Club sports ==
Eastern Michigan has over 15 club sport teams. Ranging from traditional sports such as men's hockey to unique sports such as Quidditch and Roller Hockey. Roller Hockey achieved national championships in 2001 in NCRHA Division II.

=== Men's ACHA Hockey ===
The men's hockey team play in the Great Lakes Collegiate Hockey League (GLCHL) of the American Collegiate Hockey Association (ACHA) in the Division 1 level. The Eastern Michigan Eagles hockey team began play in 1976. In the first 33 years of existence the Eagles played in the Central States Collegiate Hockey League (CSCHL) before switching to the newly formed GLCHL at the start of the 2010–2011 season. In 2003, the team was suspended for hazing from the 2004–05 season until 2007. The team were national runners-up in 2000 and 1994 in the ACHA Division I league.

== Athletics venues ==
Venue	Opened	Sport(s) hosted	Capacity	Named for	Ref.
Oestrike Stadium	1971	Baseball	2,500	Ronald Oestrike (Note: Baseball coach for EMU.)	
George Gervin Center	1997	Basketball	8,824	George Gervin	
Rynearson Stadium	1969	Football	26,188	Elton Rynearson	
Bowen Field House	1955	Track and field, gymnastics, wresting, basketball (1955–1997)	5,400	Wilbur P. Bowen (Note: Bowen was a mathematics instructor and first head of the Department of Physical Education at EMU, 1894-1928)	
St. Joe's Sports Dome (Note: Previously, "Indoor Practice Facility", renamed in 2019.)	2010	Football, soccer	n/a	Saint Joseph Mercy Health System	

=== Gallery ===
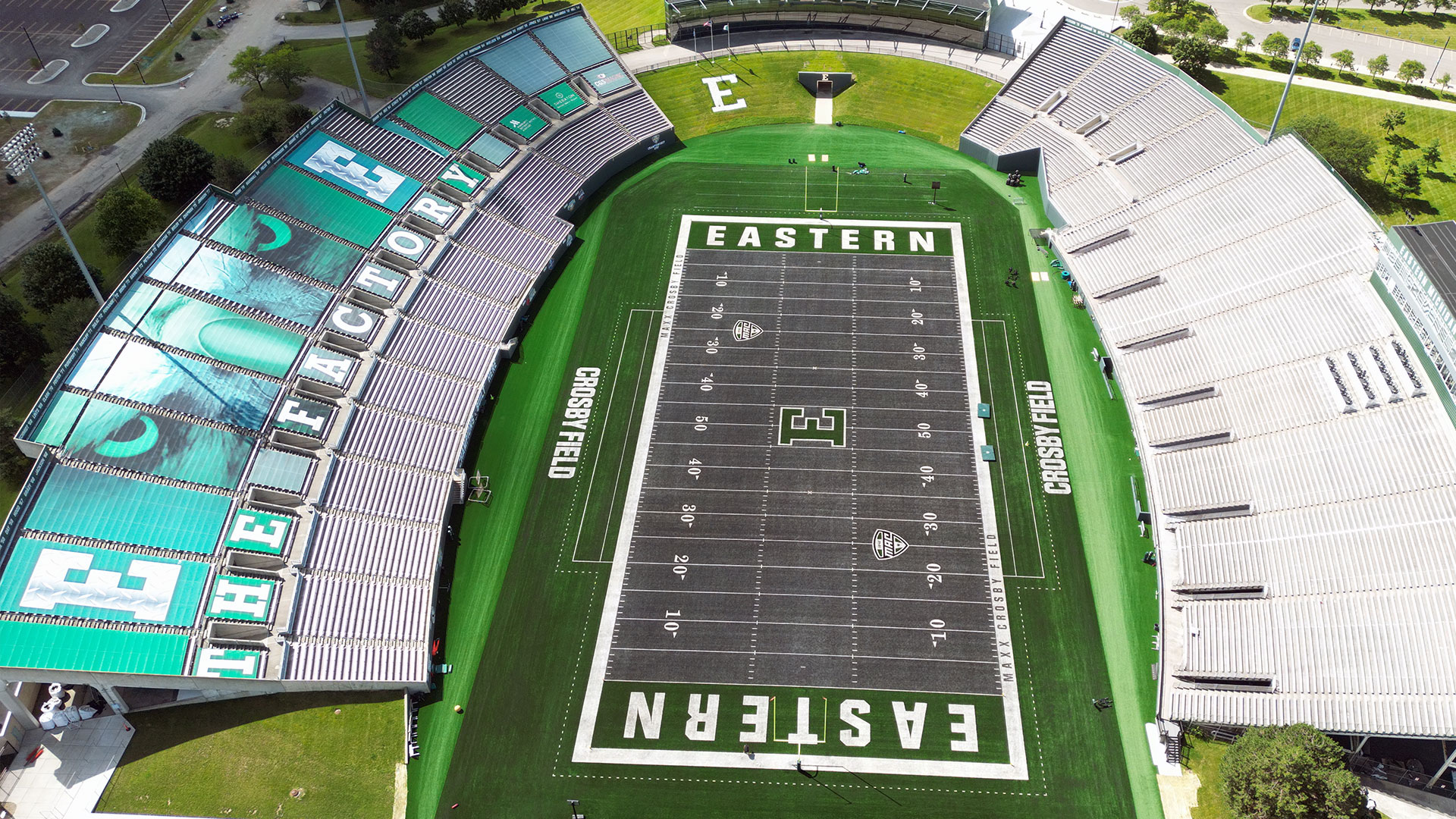
Rynearson Stadium

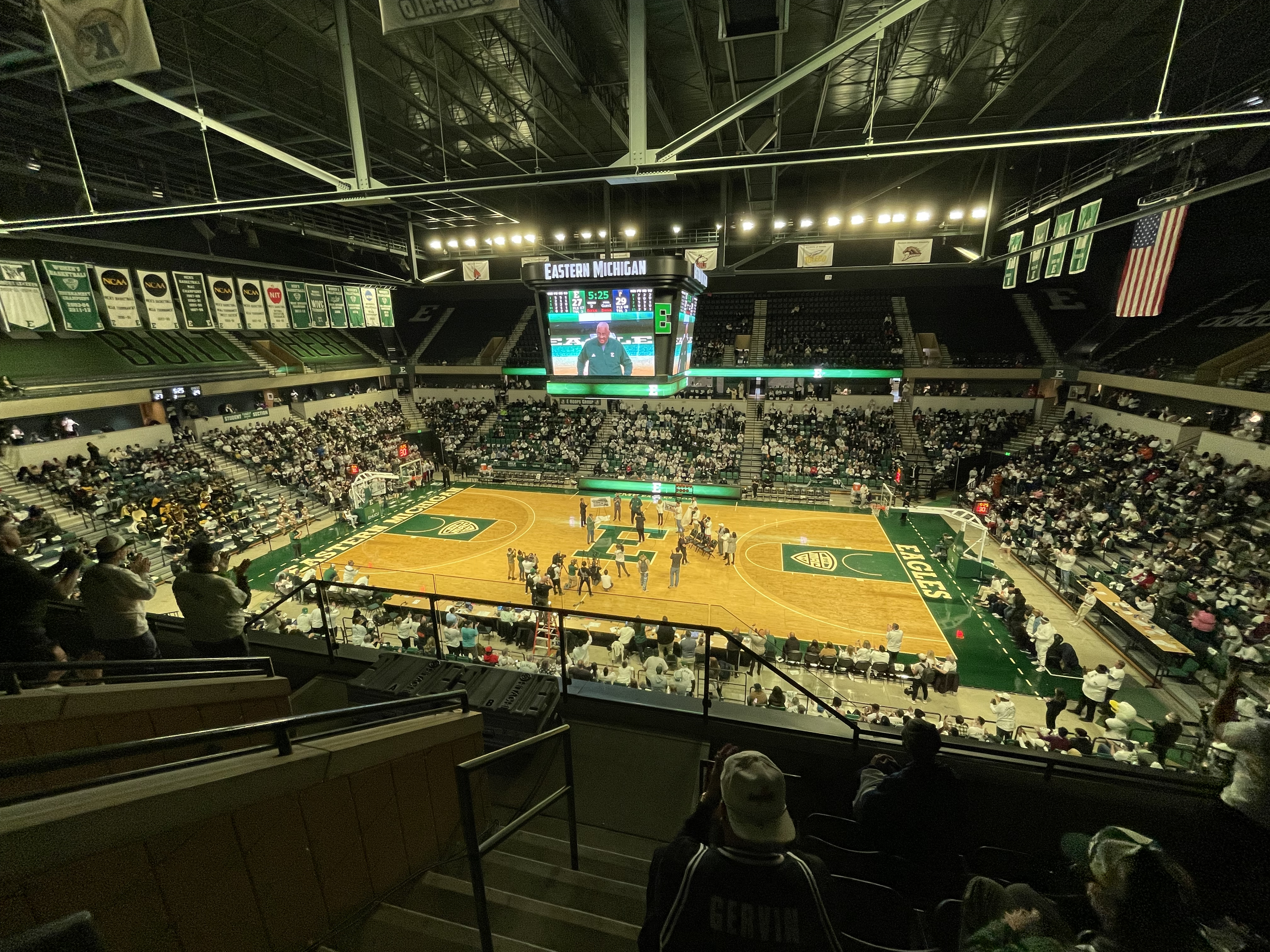
George Gervin GameAbove Center

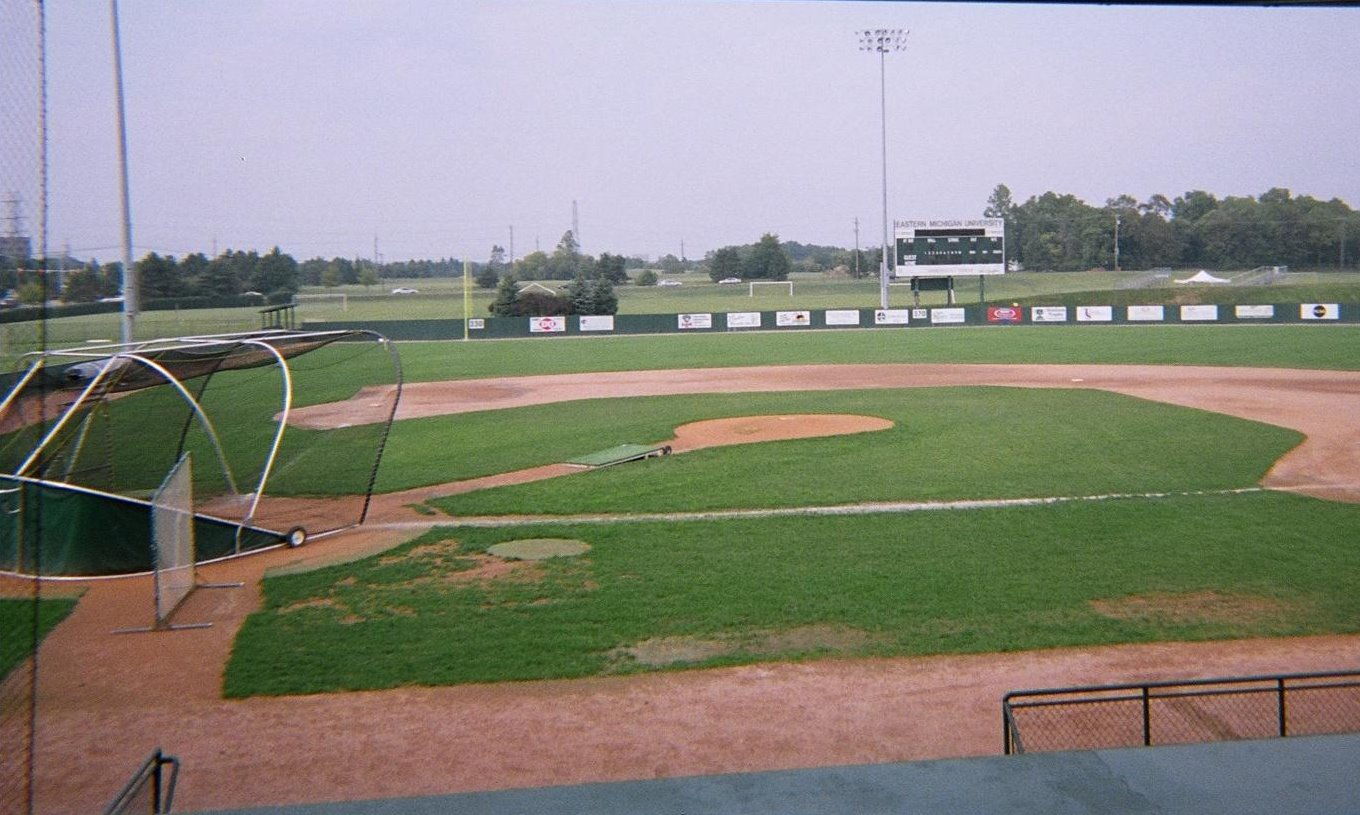
Oestrike Stadium

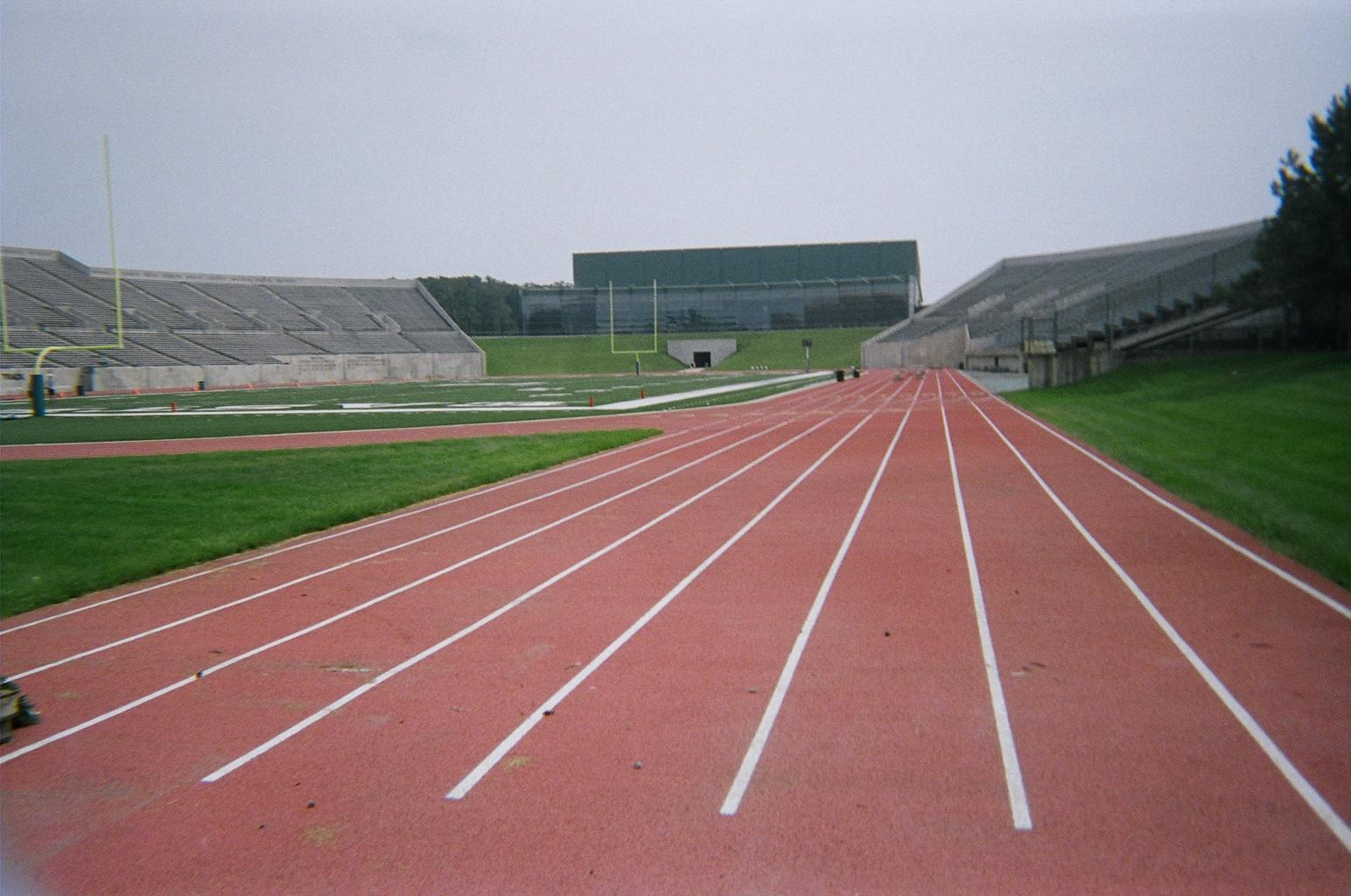
Athletics track at Rynearson Stadium

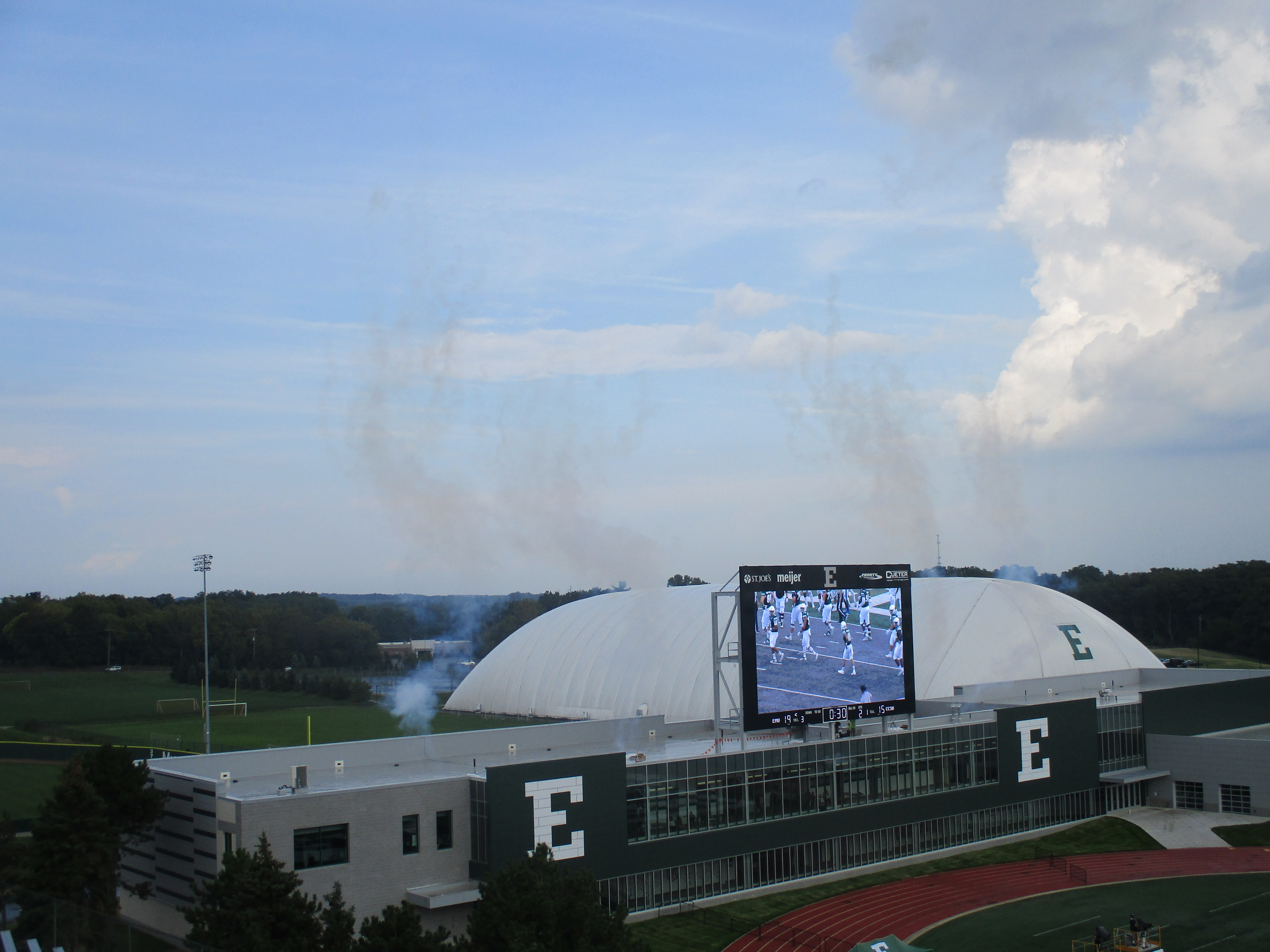
St. Joe's Sports Dome

== Records ==
=== NAIA & NCAA D2 records ===
==== Team records ====
National championships (16)

- 1972: Men's Swimming and Diving – NCAA Division II
- 1972: Men's Outdoor Track and Field – NCAA Division II
- 1971: Men's Swimming and Diving – NAIA
- 1971: Men's Indoor Track and Field – NAIA
- 1971: Men's Outdoor Track and Field – NAIA
- 1970: Baseball – NAIA
- 1970: Men's Cross Country – NCAA Division II
- 1970: Men's Cross Country – NAIA
- 1970: Men's Swimming and Diving – NAIA
- 1970: Men's Indoor Track and Field – NAIA
- 1970: Men's Outdoor Track and Field – NAIA
- 1969: Men's Swimming and Diving – NAIA
- 1969: Men's Indoor Track and Field – NAIA
- 1968: Men's Swimming and Diving – NAIA
- 1967: Men's Cross Country – NAIA
- 1966: Men's Cross Country – NAIA

National runners-up (6)

- 1971: Men's Basketball – NAIA Division I
- 1969: Men's Cross Country – NCAA Division II
- 1969: Men's Cross Country – NAIA
- 1965: Men's Cross Country – NCAA Division II
- 1940: Men's Cross Country – NCAA

=== Individual records ===
Individual champions Men's Track and Field:

- 2004 Jordan Desilets, 3000-meter steeplechase 8:24.62
- 2002 Boaz Cheboiywo, 10,000 meters outdoor track
- 1999 Clement Chukwu, 400 meters
- 1985 Earl Jones, 800 meters
- 1975 Halsey Crawford, 100 yards
- 1959 Hayes Jones, 120- & 220-yard hurdles
- 1932 Eugene Beatty, 400-meter hurdles

Men's Cross Country:

- 2001 Boaz Cheboiywo

Women's track and field:

- 2005 Lela Nelson, heptathlon
- 1995 Savatheda Fynes, 200 meters

== Olympians ==
EMU has 20 students and alumni who have competed in the Olympic Games. The earliest being Lloyd Olds, in 1932. The most recent being 2016 with Eric Alejandro

- 2016 - Eric Alejandro
- 2012 – Eric Alejandro and Jamie Nieto
- 2008 – Sasha Springer-Jones
- 2004 Athens Games: USA- Jamie Nieto (High Jump, 4th)
- 2000 Sydney Games: Nigeria- Nduka Awazie (4 × 400 meter relay, Silver), Nigeria – Clement Chukwu (200 & 400 meters)
- 1996 Atlanta Games: USA- Paul McMullen (1500 meters, 9th), Suriname – Tommy Asinga (800 meters), British West Indies – Greg Rhymer (1500 meters), Nigeria – Clement Chukwu (200 & 400 meters), Bahamas – Savatheda Fynes (100 & 200 meters, 400M Relay)
- 1992 Barcelona Games: Suriname – Tommy Asinga (800 meters)
- 1988 Seoul Games: Suriname – Tommy Asinga (800 meters)
- 1984 Los Angeles Games: USA- Earl Jones (800 meters, Bronze), Trinidad and Tobago- Hasely Crawford (100 meters)
- 1980 Moscow Games: Trinidad and Tobago- Hasely Crawford (100 meters)
- 1976 Montreal Games: Trinidad and Tobago- Hasely Crawford (100 meters, Gold, 200 meters)
- 1972 Munich Games: Trinidad and Tobago- Hasely Crawford (100 meters)
- 1968 Mexico City Games: Canada – Dave Ellis (10,000 meters)
- 1964 Tokyo Games: USA- Hayes Jones (110 High Hurdles, Gold), USA – Dean Rockwell, Manager of the Greco Roman Wrestling Squad
- 1960 Rome Games: USA- Hayes Jones (110 High Hurdles, Bronze)
- 1948 London Games: USA – George Marshall, Manager, Men's Track and Field
- 1932 Los Angeles Games: USA – Lloyd Olds, Assistant Coach, Track and Field

== Marching bands ==
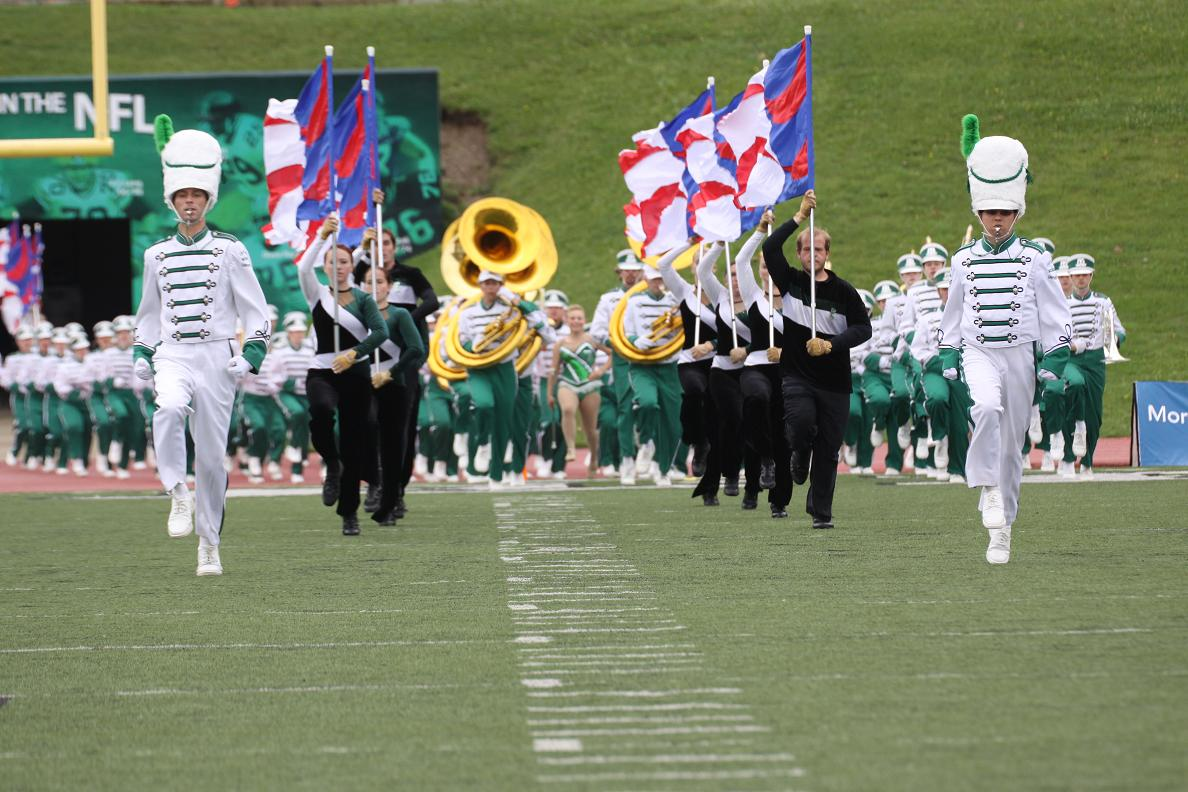
EMU Marching Band

The Eastern Michigan University Marching Band, nicknamed "The Pride of the Peninsula," was first formed in 1894.

The Eastern Michigan University Basketball Band is directed by the two graduate assistants of the band. Unlike the marching band which is made up of all brass and woodwinds, the Basketball Band's instrumentation is strictly "Brass and Sax." The Basketball Band travels with the basketball teams during the MAC tournament or the NCAA tournament.

The school song "Our Pledge" was written by Edward Bowles and was arranged for the marching band by Thomas Tyra. The melody of "Eagles Fight Song" was written by Larry Livingston and arranged for marching band by Thomas Tyra. The percussion parts were written by Whitney Prince. "Go Green" was written by Thomas Tyra.

== Mascot ==
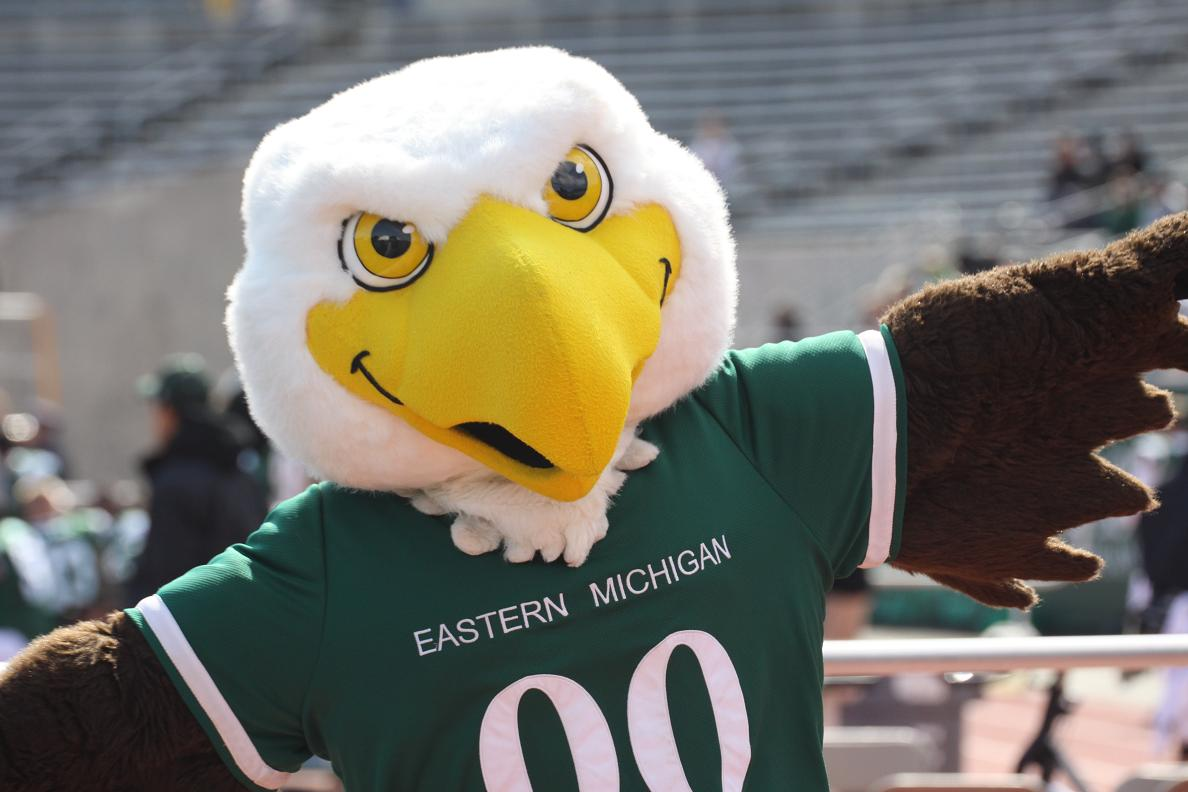
Swoop, EMU's Mascot

Swoop is the mascot for Eastern Michigan University. Before the 1991 season, Eastern Michigan University went by the "Hurons." After 1991 Eastern has gone by the "Eagles." Even though the school adopted the name "Eagles" it was not until 1994 when "Swoop" was adopted as the official mascot for the university. Swoop is depicted as an American bald eagle wearing an Eastern Michigan University jersey, displaying the numbers "00" on the front and "Swoop" on the back. At the Eastern Michigan University bookstore a stuffed animal pair can be purchased, one wearing a jersey, the other wearing a cheerleader outfit.
