= Earl Jones (runner) =

American middle-distance runner

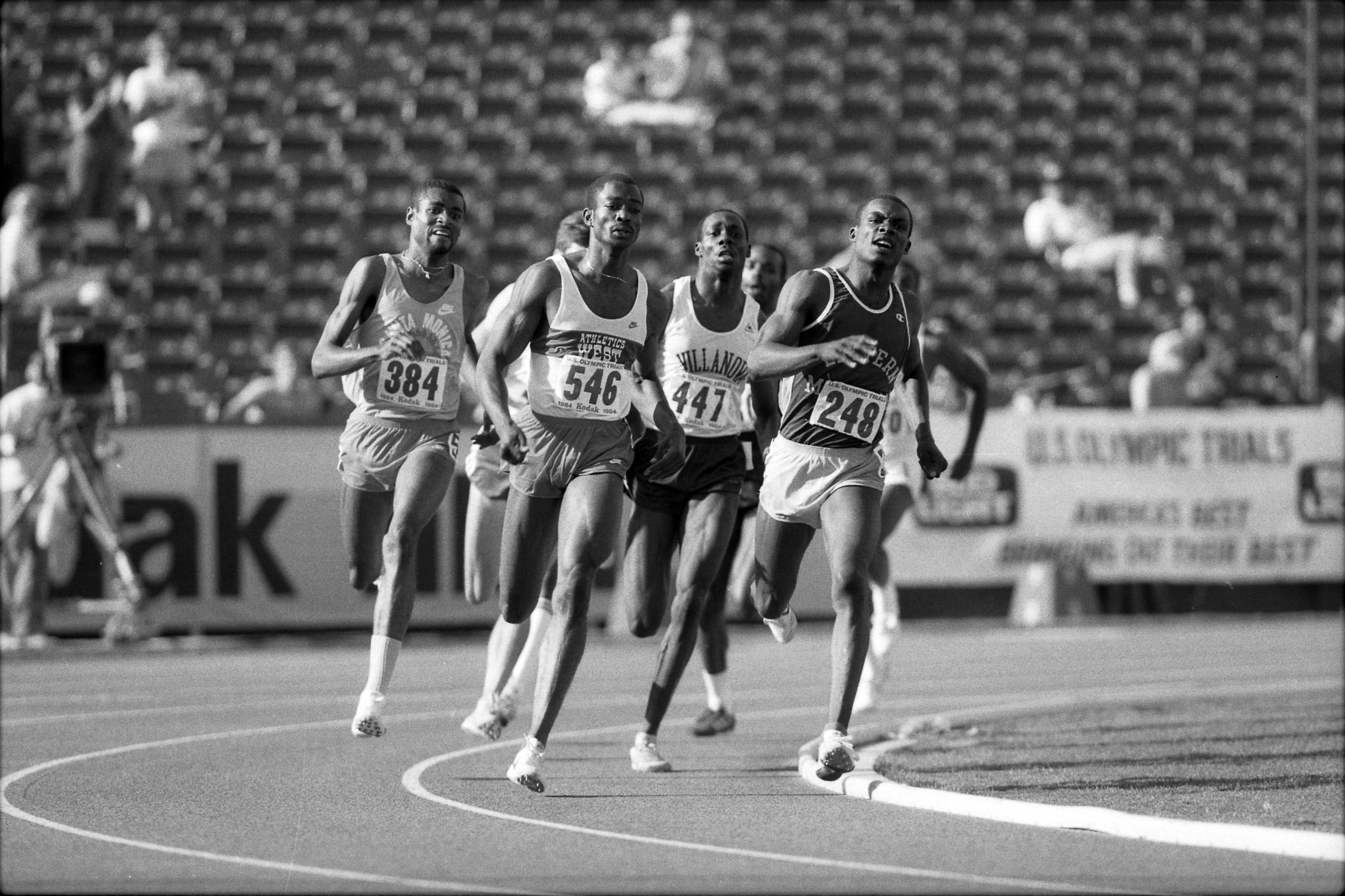
- Jones (#248) leading the men's 800 m event at the 1984 U.S. Olympic trials

Personal information
- Born: July 17, 1964 (age 61) Chicago, Illinois, U.S.

Sport
- Country: United States
- Sport: Track and Field
- Event: Middle Distance
- College team: Eastern Michigan
- Club: Santa Monica Track Club
Medal record
Men's athletics
Representing the United States
Olympic Games
Bronze medal – third place	1984 Los Angeles	800 metres

Earl Jones (born July 17, 1964 in Chicago, Illinois) is an American former middle-distance runner who won an 800 meters bronze medal at the 1984 Summer Olympics in Los Angeles. He finished third behind Joaquim Cruz and Sebastian Coe with a time of 1:43.83 minutes.

Earlier that summer at the U.S. Olympic Trials, Jones won the 800 meters, just barely nudging out Johnny Gray as both men ran a time of 1:43.74, beating Rick Wohlhuter's American Record. In 1985, Jones won the 800 meters at the NCAA Outdoor Championship (in 1:45.12) and in 1986 he further improved his personal best to 1:43.62 minutes at a meeting in Zürich.

In 1986 Jones joined the sub 4:00 mile club with a 3:58.76 record mile at Westwood in May. Jones attended Eastern Michigan University (finishing second in the 800 meters to Joaquim Cruz in the 1984 NCAA championships and first in the 800 in 1985) and Taylor Center High School in Taylor, MI (class of 1982).
