= Paul McMullen =

American middle-distance runner (1972–2021)

Paul McMullan
Personal information
- National team: United States
- Citizenship: United States
- Born: February 19, 1972
- Died: March 4, 2021 (aged 49) Wexford County, Michigan, U.S.
- Home town: Cadillac, Michigan, U.S.
- Education: Cadillac High School; Eastern Michigan University
- Years active: ~1988 - 2004
- Height: 6 ft 2 in (188 cm)
- Children: yes
- Parents: Doug and Theresa McMullen
- Relatives: Phil McMullen; Sarah McMullen

Sport
- Country: United States
- Sport: Middle-distance running
- University team: Eastern Michigan University
- NCAA Division I: Mid-American Conference
- Turned pro: 1995
- Retired: 2004

Achievements and titles
- Olympic finals: 1st 1500 meter 1996 U.S. Trial semi-finalist 1500 meter 1996
- World finals: 10th in 1500 meter at 1995
- National finals: 1st 1500 meter 1995; 1st 1500 meter 1996; 3rd 1500 meter 1998; 1st indoor mile 1998
- Highest world ranking: 2001: #1 in USA (Track and Field News)

Paul McMullen (19 February 1972 – 4 March 2021) was an American middle-distance runner who specialized in the 1500 meters. Paul was known by some as "the pride of Cadillac" after qualifying and competing in the 1996 Summer Olympics in Atlanta, Georgia.

== Early life ==
McMullen was born 19 February 1972, son of Doug and Theresa McMullen. He grew up in Cadillac, Michigan with his brother Phil and sister Sarah. An early physical education teacher noticed his speed and told him he should run track. Years later, when he was a 6-foot-2-inch, 165 pound tight end on his high school's football team, he and a few football teammates joined the track team during the football off-season. By his senior year of high school, McMullen won the Michigan state title in the mile.

== Running career ==
McMullen received a small athletic scholarship to Eastern Michigan University and ran under legendary EMU coach Bob Parks. McMullen graduated in accounting in 1995 and was well prepared for a running career: as of 2022, he retains EMU's fastest time at 3:38:74 in the 1500 meter run, the second fastest time in the 800 meter run, and stands all-time 32nd of 75 men in the 5000 meter run. Although he had struggled in his early college days, red-shirting his first collegiate year, he became an eight-time All-American and was inducted into the Drake Relays Hall of Fame in 2000 and into EMU's Athletic Hall of Fame in 2003.

McMullen finished tenth at the 1995 World Championships in Athletics in Gothenburg, Sweden. He won National Championships in 1995 (1500 m), 1996 (1500 m) and 1998 (Indoor Mile). He won the 1996 U.S. Olympic Trials 1500 m and was a semi-finalist at the Atlanta Summer Olympics the same year, gaining the moniker, "the pride of Cadillac". His personal best 1500 m time was 3:33.89 minutes, achieved in July 2001 in Monte Carlo, Monaco. In 2001, Track and Field News ranked him at number one in the US. McMullen finished tenth at the 2001 World Championships in Athletics in Edmonton, Alberta, Canada.

In 1997, McMullen lost parts of two toes when his foot slipped under a lawnmower he was operating. He returned to the sport in December 1998 and was able to run even faster than before the accident. Runner's World referred to him, somewhat tongue-in-cheek, as "the world's fastest eight-toed miler."

=== Sponsors ===
After graduation in 1995, he ran three seasons for Asics Shoes and four seasons for Saucony Shoes before enlisting in the United States Coast Guard at age 29 and served four years as a surface swimmer and Federal Boarding Officer on the Great Lakes. McMullen still holds the Coast Guard's Cape May New Jersey Training Center 1.5-mile run record of 7:09 which he ran on week 6 of basic training in December 2002. McMullen last broke the four-minute mile at the Prefontaine Classic in Eugene, Oregon at the age of 32, yet soon retired from running after failing to make the 2004 Olympic Team while representing the US Coast Guard.

== Personal life ==
McMullen had two children from his first marriage (Jill Stamison), Olivia and David, aged 19 and 14 respectively at the time of his death. McMullen married secondly to his high school girl-friend, Nuria DeSoto Queralto of Spain in December 2011. His wife Nuria of just under ten years gave birth to their first child Catalina on July 5, 2014. Paul is brother to Phil McMullen, a fireman paramedic in the East Bay Area of San Francisco, California, and former world class decathlete.

== Later life ==
Before his death, McMullen worked as a Life Safety Consultant for EPS Security and competed in masters road cycling events during the summer. He was the founder and Coach of Chariots of Fire youth running club.

== Death ==
Paul McMullen was killed on 4 March 2021 in a skiing accident in Northern Michigan. He was 49 years old.

== YouTube links ==
- YouTube: "I Dare You to Run". By Paul McMullen, edited by Kevin Stinehart. Accessed 13 May 2022.
- YouTube: Kevin Sullivan vs. Paul McMullen - Men's 1500m - 1995 NCAA Outdoor Championships. Accessed 13 May 2022.
- YouTube: 1996 US Olympic Trials - Men's 1500 Meter Final. Accessed 13 May 2022.
- YouTube: Paul McMullen - Lawnmower Accident (1997). Accessed 13 May 2022.
- YouTube: Paul McMullen - Men's Mile - 1998 USA Indoor Championships. Accessed 13 May 2022.
- YouTube: Chariots of Fire Hail Mary Part 1 DEC 2020. Accessed 14 May 2022.
