= Owen Hamilton =

Jamaican middle-distance runner

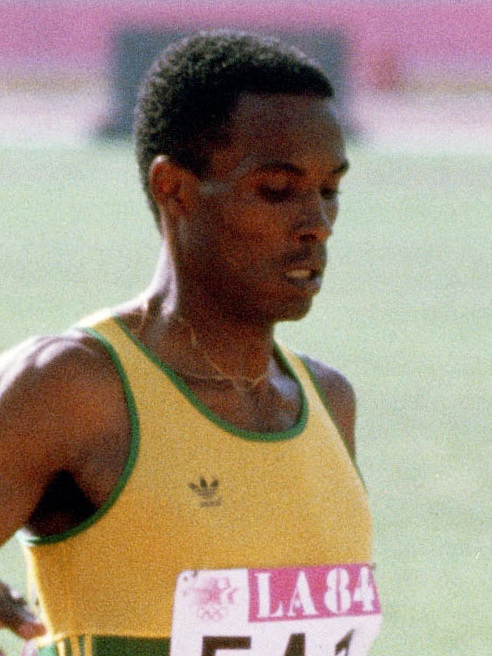
- Hamilton competing in the 800 metres of the 1984 Olympics

Personal information
- Born: 21 April 1959 (age 67) Clarendon Parish, Colony of Jamaica, British Empire

Sport
- Sport: Middle-distance running
- Event: 800 metres

Owen Hamilton (born 21 April 1959) is a Jamaican middle-distance runner. He competed in the 800 metres at the 1980 Summer Olympics and the 1984 Summer Olympics.

Hamilton competed for the Texas Longhorns track and field team in the NCAA.
