= Eastern Michigan Eagles wrestling =

Wrestling team of Eastern Michigan University

- Founded: 1956; disestablished in 2018; 7 years ago
- University: Eastern Michigan University
- Conference: MAC
- Location: Ypsilanti, MI
- Arena: Convocation Center (Capacity: 8,824)
- Nickname: Eagles
- Colors: Green and white

Eastern Michigan Eagles wrestling team was a men's athletic program at Eastern Michigan University. Based in Ypsilanti in the U.S. state of Michigan, the Eastern Michigan Eagles competed in NCAA Division I and were a member of Mid-American Conference.

The program was cut by the University in 2018 along with other sports.

== History ==
Eastern Michigan adopted the sport of wrestling in 1956. The wrestling program was part of the National Association of Intercollegiate Athletics (NAIA) from 1957 through 1962. In 1963–1966, EMU wrestling switched conferences to the Presidents' Athletic Conference (PAC). Since the exit of the PAC conference, EMU has been a part of the Mid-American Conference (MAC), starting in 1973. In 1996, Eastern won its first Mid-American conference Championship under MAC Coach of the Year Willie Gadson. Eastern put six wrestlers in the finals and placed 8 of 10.

On March 20, 2018, EMU announced the elimination of wrestling and three other sports. Apart from wrestling, EMU eliminated men's swimming and diving, women's tennis, and softball. Other programs cut in the past had been men's gymnastics and women's field hockey (1988), men's tennis and men's soccer (2000).

== Home meets ==
Home meets were held in 8,824 seat EMU Convocation Center located on Eastern Michigan's campus in Ypsilanti, Michigan. Since 1991, the university was an annual host of the EMU Open/EMU Duals with over 500 wrestlers and NCAA schools across all divisions.

== Coaches ==
=== Head coach ===
The EMU wrestling team was coached by David Bolyard. David Bolyard took over the program from Derek DelPorto in 2014. David Bolyard attended Central Michigan University in 2000 and graduated from CMU. David Bolyard was an All-American his junior year, a four-time national qualifier, receive All-American honors, and broke a school record by winning 21 straight matches. David Bolyard was awarded the Chick Sherwood Award, which was presented to CMU's most valuable wrestler. David Bolyard ranked seventh all-time with 109 career wins and is tied for 10th with 22 falls in CMU history. David Bolyard was a 3x runner-up and a 2005 MAC champion at 165 lbs. Davis Bolyard came to EMU in 2007 as an assistant coach, hired by former head coach, Derek DelPorto.

== All-Americans ==
NAIA

- Eliehue Brunson (1965) 6th, (1965) 6th
- Bob Ray (1967) 2nd
- Dale Kestel (1968) 5th
- Larry Miele (1968) 3rd
- Mike Weede (1970) 5th
- Tom Jackson (1970) 6th
- Doug Willer (1971) 3rd

NCAA Division II

- Tom Buckalew (1966) 4th
- Bob Ray (1967) 5th (1966) 2nd
- Mark Davids (1971) 2nd
- Doug Willer (1972) 5th

NCAA Division I

- Jerry Umin (1987) 7th
- Joel Smith (1989) 5th
- Lee Pritts (1996) 6th
- Mike Feeney (1999) 8th
- Sa'Derian Perry (2018) 8th

== Mid-American Conference champions ==
1972-1990

- 1972-73 Doug Willer 142 lbs
- 1975-76 Rick Setzer Hwt
- 1983-84 Steve Brown 118 lbs
- 1983-84 Robert Beck 126 lbs
- 1985-86 Steve Brown 118 lbs
- 1986-87 Jerry Umin 167 lbs
- 1987-88 Steve Brown 126 lbs
- 1987-88 Joel Smith 158 lbs
- 1987-88 Jerry Umin 167 lbs
- 1988-89 Doug Harper 118 lbs
- 1988-89 Brian Schneider 150 lbs
- 1988-89 Joel Smith 158 lbs
- 1989-90 Hugh Waddington 142 lbs

1991–present

- 1990-91 Tony Venturini 118 lbs
- 1991-92 Tony Venturini 118 lbs
- 1995-96 Lee Pritts 118 lbs
- 1995-96 Matt Turnbow 126 lbs
- 1995-96 Ramico Blackmon 150 lbs
- 1995-96 Jake Shulaw 158 lbs
- 1995-96 Nate Miklusak 167 lbs
- 2006-07 Jermain Thompson 149 lbs
- 2008-09 John McClure 197 lbs
- 2017-18 Kayne MacCallum 184 lbs
