= Lists of Americans =

These are lists of prominent Americans. They are grouped by various criteria, including race, religion, state, city, occupation and educational affiliation.

== By ethnicity or place of origin ==
- Afghan Americans
- African Americans
- Albanian Americans
- Amish Americans
- Angolan Americans
- Antiguan and Barbudan Americans
- Arab Americans
- Argentine Americans
- Armenian Americans
- Asian Americans
- Assyrian Americans
- Asturian Americans
- Australian Americans
- Austrian Americans
- Azerbaijani Americans
- Bahamian Americans
- Bangladeshi Americans
- Barbadian Americans
- Basque Americans
- Belarusian Americans
- Belgian Americans
- Belizean Americans
- Beninese Americans
- Berber Americans
- Bermudian Americans
- Bolivian Americans
- Bosnian Americans
- Brazilian Americans
- British Americans
- Bulgarian Americans
- Burmese Americans
- Cajun Americans
- Californio Americans
- Cambodian Americans
- Cameroonian Americans
- Canadian Americans
- Canarian Americans
- Cape Verdean Americans
- Catalan Americans
- Chamorro People
- Chechen Americans
- Chilean Americans
- Chinese Americans
- Circassian Americans
- Colombian Americans
- Congolese Americans
- Coptic Americans
- Cornish Americans
- Cossack Americans
- Costa Rican Americans
- Croatian Americans
- Cuban Americans
- Cypriot Americans
- Czech Americans
- Danish Americans
- Dominican Americans (Dominica)
- Dominican Americans (Dominican Republic)
- Dutch Americans
- Dutch West Indian Americans
- Ecuadorian Americans
- Egyptian Americans
- Emirati Americans
- English Americans
- Equatoguinean Americans
- Eritrean Americans
- Estonian Americans
- Ethiopian Americans
- Fijian Americans
- Filipino Americans
- Finnish Americans
- French Americans
- French-Canadian Americans
- French Polynesian Americans
- Frisian Americans
- Fula Americans
- Fuzhounese Americans
- Gabonese Americans
- Galician Americans
- Gambian Americans
- Georgian Americans
- German Americans
- Ghanaian Americans
- Greek Americans
- Greenlandic Americans
- Grenadian Americans
- Guatemalan Americans
- Guinean Americans
- Gujarati Americans
- Guyanese Americans
- Haitian Americans
- Hakka Americans
- Hispanic and Latino Americans
- Hispano Americans
- Hmong Americans
- Hoklo Americans
- Honduran Americans
- Hong Kong Americans
- Hungarian Americans
- Icelandic Americans
- Igbo Americans
- Indian Americans
- Indo-Caribbean Americans
- Indonesian Americans
- Iranian Americans
- Iraqi Americans
- Irish Americans
- Israeli Americans
- Italian Americans
- Ivorian Americans
- Jamaican Americans
- Japanese Americans
- Jewish Americans
- Jewish African-Americans
- Kalmyk Americans
- Karen Americans
- Kazakh Americans
- Kenyan Americans
- Kittian and Nevisian Americans
- Korean Americans
- Kurdish Americans
- Kuwaiti Americans
- Laotian Americans
- Latvian Americans
- Lebanese Americans
- Liberian Americans
- Libyan Americans
- Liechtensteiner Americans
- Lithuanian Americans
- Louisiana Creoles
- Louisiana Isleño Americans
- Luxembourg Americans
- Macedonian Americans
- Malawian Americans
- Malayali Americans
- Malian Americans
- Manx Americans
- Marshallese Americans
- Māori Americans
- Mexican Americans
- Micronesian Americans
- Moldovan Americans
- Mongolian Americans
- Montenegrin Americans
- Moroccan Americans
- Native Americans
- Native Hawaiians
- Nepalese Americans
- New Zealand Americans
- Nicaraguan Americans
- Nigerian Americans
- Norwegian Americans
- Pakistani Americans
- Palauan Americans
- Palestinian Americans
- Panamanian Americans
- Paraguayan Americans
- Pashtun Americans
- Peruvian Americans
- Polish Americans
- Portuguese Americans
- Puerto Ricans Americans
- Romani Americans
- Romanian Americans
- Russian Americans
- Rusyn Americans
- Saint Lucian Americans
- Salvadoran Americans
- Sammarinese
- Scotch-Irish Americans
- Scottish Americans
- Senegalese Americans
- Serbian Americans
- Sicilian Americans
- Sierra Leonean Americans
- Sindhi Americans
- Singaporean Americans
- Slovak Americans
- Slovene Americans
- Somali Americans
- South African Americans
- South Sudanese Americans
- Spanish Americans
- Sri Lankan Americans
- Sudanese Americans
- Surinamese Americans
- Swedish Americans
- Swiss Americans
- Syrian Americans
- Taiwanese Americans
- Tajik Americans
- Tamil Americans
- Tanzanian Americans
- Tejano Americans
- Telugu Americans
- Thai Americans
- Tibetan Americans
- Timorese Americans
- Togolese Americans
- Tongan Americans
- Trinidadian and Tobagonian Americans
- Tunisian Americans
- Turkish Americans
- Ugandan Americans
- Ukrainian Americans
- Uruguayan Americans
- Uzbek Americans
- Uyghur Americans
- Venezuelan Americans
- Vietnamese Americans
- Vincentian Americans
- Virgin Islands Americans
- Welsh Americans
- West Indian Americans
- Yemeni Americans
- Yoruba Americans
- Zimbabwean Americans

== By religion ==
- American atheists
- American Buddhists
- American Christians
- American Jews
- American Muslims

== By first-level sub-divisions in the U.S. ==
=== States ===
- Alabama
- Alaska
- Arizona
- Arkansas
- California
- Colorado
- Connecticut
- Delaware
- Florida
- Georgia
- Hawaii
- Idaho
- Illinois
- Indiana
- Iowa
- Kansas
- Kentucky
- Louisiana
- Maine
- Maryland
- Massachusetts
- Michigan
- Minnesota
- Mississippi
- Missouri
- Montana
- Nebraska
- Nevada
- New Hampshire
- New Jersey
- New Mexico
- New York
- North Carolina
- North Dakota
- Ohio
- Oklahoma
- Oregon
- Pennsylvania
- Rhode Island
- South Carolina
- South Dakota
- Tennessee
- Texas
- Utah
- Vermont
- Virginia
- Washington
- West Virginia
- Wisconsin
- Wyoming

=== Territories (insular areas) ===
- American Samoa
- Guam
- Northern Mariana Islands
- Puerto Rico
- United States Virgin Islands

=== Federal District ===
- District of Columbia

== Miscellaneous ==
- List of American suffragists
- List of Americans who married foreign royalty and nobility
- List of naturalized American citizens
- List of Ellis Island immigrants
