= List of Australian Americans =

This is a list of notable Australian Americans, including both original immigrants who obtained American citizenship and their American descendants.

== Business ==
Name	Born – died	Notable for	Connection with Australia	Connection with the United States
Elisabeth Murdoch	1968–	Businesswoman	born in Australia with a dual citizenship	father is Australian-born Rupert Murdoch
Ken Ham	1951–	Founder of the Young Earth Creationist organization Answers in Genesis	born in Australia	resides in the U.S.
Rupert Murdoch	1931–	CEO of News Corporation	born in Australia	became naturalized U.S. citizen in 1985
Jacques Nasser	1947–	former CEO of Ford Motors	born in Lebanon but raised in Australia	resides in the U.S.
Matthew Pritzker	1982–	investor and businessman	Australian mother	born in the U.S.; American father

== Public service ==
Name	Born – died	Notable for	Connection with Australia	Connection with the United States
Richard W. Fisher	1949–	Federal Reserve Bank of Dallas President	Australian-American father	U.S. citizen at birth
John Henderson	1925–2010	blind activist	born in Australia	emigrated to the U.S. with parents as a child
Martin Indyk	1951–	former U.S. Ambassador to Israel	British born, Australian raised	U.S. diplomat
James Wolfensohn	1933–2020	former President of the World Bank	born in Australia	naturalized as U.S. citizen in 1980

== Politics ==
Name	Born – died	Notable for	Connection with Australia	Connection with America
Mick Bates	1970–	Member of the West Virginia House of Delegates	born in Australia	naturalized U.S. citizen
Harry Bridges	1901–1990	International Longshore and Warehouse Union leader	born in Australia	became naturalized U.S. citizen in 1945
Gavin Buckley	1963–	Mayor of Annapolis, Maryland	born in Australia	became naturalized U.S. citizen in 2009
Frank G. Finlayson	1864–1947	Associate Justice of the California Supreme Court	born in Australia	naturalized U.S. citizen
Jeff Merkley	1956–	Senator from Oregon	Australian paternal grandmother	born in the U.S.
Jon Ossoff	1987–	Senator from Georgia	Australian mother	born in the U.S.
Leo H. Susman	1879–1928	Member of the California State Assembly	born in Australia	naturalized U.S. citizen

== Authors ==
Name	Born – died	Notable for	Connection with Australia	Connection with America
Geraldine Brooks	1955–	author	born in Australia	father was American; became naturalized U.S. citizen in 2002
Prudence Farrow	1948–	author	Australian father	U.S. born; Irish-American mother
Jill Ker Conway	1934–2018	author & academic	born in Australia	worked in the U.S.
Sumner Locke Elliott	1917–1991	author of Careful, He Might Hear You	born in Australia	moved to the U.S. in 1948 and became naturalized U.S. citizen in 1955

== Scientists ==
Name	Born – died	Notable for	Connection with Australia	Connection with America
Bruce Bolt	1930–2015	seismologist	born and raised in Australia	naturalized American citizen
Philip K. Chapman	1935–2021	astronaut	born in Australia	emigrated to the U.S.
Terence James Elkins	1936–2023	physicist, 1st ascent of Mount Elkins, 1979 Harold Brown Award recipient	born in Australia	emigrated to the U.S. in 1963; naturalized U.S. citizen in 1971
Paul D. Scully-Power	1944–	oceanographer and astronaut	born in Australia	naturalized U.S. citizen in 1982
Andy Thomas	1951–	astronaut	born in Australia	naturalized U.S. citizen in 1986
Elizabeth Blackburn	1948–	winner of the 2009 Nobel Prize in Physiology or Medicine	born in Australia	naturalized U.S. citizen

== Artists ==
Name	Born – died	Notable for	Connection with Australia	Connection with America
Pat Oliphant	1935–2026	New York Times cartoonist	born in Australia	emigrated to U.S. in 1964

== Sport ==
Name	Born – died	Notable for	Connection with Australia	Connection with America
Carsten Ball	1987–	retired tennis player	Australian father	American-born and resides in the U.S.
Darren Bennett	1965–	Australian rules football and American football	born in Australia, played AFL	played NFL
Jonah Bolden	1996–	basketball	born in Melbourne	father is American
Taj Burrow	1978–	surfing	born in Australia	parents are U.S. citizens
James Cruikshanks	1971–	professional wrestling	born in Australia	moved to U.S. as a child
Taylor Dent	1981–	tennis	father is Australian Phil Dent	mother is American Betty Ann Grubb Stuart and born in the U.S.
Leigh Diffey	1971–	auto racing commentator	born in Australia	became an American citizen in 2011
Colin Edwards	1974–	motorcycle racing	Australian father	born in the U.S.
Dante Exum	1995–	basketball	born in Melbourne	American parents
Luke Hume	1988–	rugby	born in Australia	Dual citizen to the U.S. and Australia
Kyrie Irving	1992–	basketball	born in Melbourne	American parents and Dual Citizen to the U.S. and Australia
Nia Jax	1984–	professional wrestler	born in Sydney	grew up in Hawaii
Jay Johnstone	1945–2020	baseball	Australian mother	born in the U.S.
Maya Joint	2006–	tennis	Australian father	born in the U.S.
Robert Machado	1973–	surfing	born in Sydney	grew up in and lives in California
David Niu	1966–	rugby	born in Australia	naturalized U.S. citizen
Ben Simmons	1996–	basketball	born in Melbourne, mother is Australian	father is American Dave Simmons
James Spithill	1979–	sailing	born in Sydney	married to an American and skippered Oracle Team USA yacht to two victories
Mike Walker	1988–	baseball	Australian mother	born in the U.S.

== Music ==
Name	Born – died	Notable for	Connection with Australia	Connection with America
Peter Allen	1944–1992	singer-songwriter, musician, and entertainer	born in Tenterfield, New South Wales	lived in the U.S.
Iggy Azalea	1990–	rapper	born in Sydney	moved to the U.S. at age 16
Nellie Breen	1897–1986	dancer and comedian	Australian mother	born in U.S.; American father
Aaron Brown	1980–	violinist and composer	raised in Australia	naturalized U.S. citizen
Brody Dalle	1979–	singer-songwriter and guitarist	born in Melbourne	lives in the U.S since 1998
Sam Farrar	1978–	member of the pop rock band Maroon 5	Australian parents	born and raised in Los Angeles
Flea	1962–	bassist for Red Hot Chili Peppers	born in Melbourne	lived in the U.S. since age 5
Gracie Folds	1999–	singer-songwriter	mother is Australian; born in Adelaide	lives in the U.S.; father is American Ben Folds
Ashton Irwin	1994–	drummer for 5 Seconds of Summer	born in Sydney	father is American; dual citizen to the U.S. and Australia
MC Lars	1982–	rapper	father is Australian	born in the U.S.
Chloe Rose Lattanzi	1986–	singer, actress	mother was Australian Olivia Newton-John (born in England)	born in the U.S.
Helen Reddy	1941–2020	actress, singer	born in Australia	naturalized U.S. citizen
Cody Simpson	1997–	pop singer	born in Gold Coast, Queensland	moved to the U.S. in 2010
Rebecca St. James	1977–	Christian pop rock singer-songwriter	born in Sydney	family moved to the U.S. at age 14; married Cubbie Fink in 2011
Rick Springfield	1949–	singer and actor	born in Sydney	lives in the U.S.
Mark Stoermer	1977–	bassist for The Killers	father is Australian	born in the U.S.
Irwin Thomas	1971–	singer-songwriter and guitarist	mother was an Australian-born folk singer and dancer; she returned to Australia in 1980, with her son.	born in 1971 in Manhattan, New York City.
Joseph Twist	1982–	composer in genres including ancient vocal music, opera, contemporary orchestral music, jazz, musical theatre and cabaret	born in Brisbane; doctorate and master's degrees from University of Queensland, Australian Film, Television and Radio School, and New York University	lives in the U.S.
Keith Urban	1967–	country musician	born in New Zealand, moved to Australia at a young age	naturalized U.S. citizen, married to American-born Australian actress Nicole Kidman, resident of Nashville, Tennessee
Betty Who	1991–	musician, singer-songwriter	born in Australia	naturalized U.S. citizen
Kate Ceberano	1966–	singer-actress	born in Australia	father born in America Tino Ceberano
Deni Hines	1970–	singer-actress	born in Australia	mother born in America Marcia Hines
John Butler	1975–	musician, founder John Butler Trio	father is Australian	born in the U.S..; American mother

== Actors/actresses ==
Name	Born – died	Notable for	Connection with Australia	Connection with America
Deniz Akdeniz	1990–	actor	born in Melbourne to Turkish Australian parents	based in Los Angeles; engaged to long term partner, American actress Riley Dandy
Simon Baker	1969–	actor	born in Launceston, Tasmania	moved to the U.S. in the 1990s; has been a dual U.S. and Australian citizen since 2010
Jacinda Barrett	1972–	actress	born in Brisbane	moved to the U.S. in the 1990s; married to U.S. citizen Gabriel Macht and became naturalized U.S. citizen in 2009
Billy Bevan	1887–1957	actor	born in Orange	
Cate Blanchett	1969–	actress	born in Melbourne	American father; dual U.S. and Australian citizen
Rose Byrne	1979–	actress	born in Balmain, New South Wales	lived in New York; married to American actor Bobby Cannavale since 2012
Charles Coleman	1885–1951	character actor	born in Sydney	
Bonar Colleano	1924–1958	actor	Australian parents	born and lived in the U.S. until he was 12
Tanzyn Crawford	2000–	actress	Born in Perth	father is American
Aisha Dee	1993–	actress, and singer	born in Australia; Australian mother	father is African American
Mia Farrow	1945–	actress	father was Australian	born in the U.S. with dual citizenship
Errol Flynn	1909–1959	actor	born in Hobart	became naturalized U.S. citizen in 1942
Sean Flynn	1941-1970	actor	son of Australian actor Errol Flynn	born in the U.S
Leila George	1992–	actress	born in Sydney; mother is Australian Greta Scacchi	father is American Vincent D'Onofrio; dual U.S. and Australian citizen
Melissa George	1976–	actress	born in Australia	moved to U.S. in the 1990s; became naturalized U.S. citizen in 2008
Mel Gibson	1956–	actor	paternal grandmother was Australian Eva Mylott	born in the U.S.
Daniel Goddard	1971–	actor	born in Sydney	became naturalized U.S. citizen in 2020
Robert Greig	1879–1958	actor	born in Melbourne	
Nicholas Hammond	1950–	actor and director	moved to Australia in the mid-1980s	born in the U.S.
Penne Hackforth-Jones	1949–2013	actress	Australian maternal grandparents	born in the U.S.
Tim Kazurinsky	1950–	actor and screenwriter	Australian mother	born in the U.S.; American father
Nicole Kidman	1967–	actress	both parents are Australians; raised in Australia	born in the U.S. with dual citizenship
Laurette Luez	1928–1999	actress	Australian mother	American father; born in the U.S.
Alanna Masterson	1988–	actress	father is Lebanese Australian Joe Reaiche	born in the U.S.; American mother
Jordan Masterson	1986–	actor	father is Lebanese Australian Joe Reaiche	born in the U.S.; American mother
Julian McMahon	1968–2025	actor	born in Australia	naturalized U.S. citizen
Poppy Montgomery	1972–	Without a Trace actor	born in Australia	lives and works in the U.S.; dual U.S. and Australian citizen
Meg Mundy	1915–2016	actress	Australian mother	naturalized U.S. citizen
Sean Murray	1977–	actor	born in America to an American father and Australian mother; spent some of his childhood in Australia	U.S. citizen
Inde Navarrette	2001–	actress	mother is Australian	born in the U.S.
Keir O'Donnell	1978–	actor	born in Sydney	moved to the U.S. in the 1980s
Nathan Parsons	1988–	actor	born in Australia	naturalized U.S. citizen
Liesel Pritzker Simmons	1984–	actress	Australian mother	born in the U.S.; American father member of the Pritzker family
Emilie de Ravin	1981–	actress	born in Australia	became naturalized U.S. citizen in 2018
Ann Richards	1917–2006	actress	born in Australia	moved to the U.S. in 1942; father was a U.S. citizen
Margot Robbie	1990–	actress, known for her role as playing Harley Quinn in the DC movie Suicide Squad	born in Australia	moved to and lives in the U.S
Tristan Rogers	1946–2025	General Hospital actor	born in Australia	naturalized U.S. citizen
Portia de Rossi	1973–	Ally McBeal actress and wife of Ellen DeGeneres	born in Australia	naturalized U.S. citizen
Jesse Spencer	1979–	actor	born in Melbourne, Australia	naturalized U.S. citizen
Tammin Sursok	1983–	Home and Away, The Young and the Restless, and Pretty Little Liars actress	born in South Africa, raised in Australia	naturalized U.S. citizen
Caitlin Stasey	1990–	actress	born in Melbourne, Australia	moved to and lives in Los Angeles
Kristen Stewart	1990–	actress	mother is Australian	born in the U.S.
Catherine Sutherland	1909–1959	actress	born in New South Wales	became naturalized U.S. citizen in 2001
Sharni Vinson	1983–	actress	born in Australia	lives and works in the U.S.; dual U.S. and Australian citizen
Angela White	1985–	pornographic actress	born in Sydney	moved to the U.S. in the 2010s
Alex Winter	1965–	actor, film director, and screenwriter	Australian father	American mother; dual U.S. and U.K. citizen
Breanna Yde	2003–	actress	Australian-born American Actress	born in Sydney, New South Wales
Jane Badler	1953–	actress singer	moved to Australia in the mid-80's or 90's.	born in the U.S.
Shannon Kenny	1968–	actress	born in Australia	moved to the U.S. in the 1990s; married to U.S. citizen Néstor Carbonell
Claire Holt	1988–	actress	born in Brisbane	naturalized U.S.citizen
Makenzie Vega	1994–	actress	moved to Australia in 2016	born in the U.S.
Brooke Harman	1985–	actress	Australian mother	born in the U.S.; American father
Ben Lawson	1980–	actor	born in Brisbane	became naturalized U.S. citizen in 2023

== Other ==
Name	Born – died	Notable for	Connection with Australia	Connection with America
Betsy Bloomingdale	1922–2016	socialite, philanthropist	parents are Australian	born in the U.S.
Valda Cooper	1915–2008	journalist, one of the first female reporters for the Associated Press	born in Melbourne, Australia	immigrated to the U.S. as an infant
Savannah Guthrie	1971–	television journalist, co-anchor of The Today Show	born in Melbourne, Australia	immigrated to the U.S. as an infant
Bindi Irwin	1998–	child television/film personality	father was Australian Steve Irwin	mother Terri Irwin is from Oregon, dual U.S. and Australian citizen
Robert Irwin	2003–	child television/film personality	father was Australian Steve Irwin	mother Terri Irwin is from Oregon, dual U.S. and Australian citizen
Elizabeth Jagger	1984–	model and actress, daughter of Mick Jagger	paternal grandmother was Australian	mother is Jerry Hall; born in the U.S.
Georgia May Jagger	1992–	model and actress, daughter of Mick Jagger	paternal grandmother was Australian	mother is Jerry Hall; born in the U.S.
Laura James	1990–	fashion model, America's Next Top Model winner	mother is Australian	father is Dynasty actor John James; born in the U.S.
Thelma Keane	1926–2008	negotiated copyrights for The Family Circus, inspiration for the comic's "Mommy" character	born and raised in Queensland	immigrated to the U.S. with her husband, Bil Keane
Brianna Keilar	1980–	television journalist for CNN	born in Australia	grew up in Orange County, California
Soledad O'Brien	1966–	television journalist	father is Australian	born in the U.S.
Anne Osborn Krueger	1934–	economist	Australian father	born in the U.S.
Katie Patrick	1980–	environmental spokesperson, entrepreneur	born in Australia	lives in the U.S.
Terry Tao	1975–	mathematician, recipient of the 2006 Fields Medal	born in Australia	won a Fulbright Scholarship in 1992; attained Ph.D. at Princeton in 1996; married an American
Felicia Taylor	1964–2023	television journalist	father was Australian Rod Taylor	born in the U.S.
Marsha Waggoner	1940–	champion poker player	born in Australia	lived in the U.S. since 1977
Christopher Wilder	1945–1984	serial killer	born in Australia	emigrated to the U.S. in 1969; father is a U.S. citizen
Peta Murgatroyd	1986–	professional dancer	born in Australia	naturalized U.S. citizen

== See also ==
- Australian Americans
- Lists of Australians
- Lists of Americans
