= List of Nepalese Americans =

This article is a list of notable Nepalese Americans.

== Entertainment and media ==
- Sujita Basnet, model
- Kiran Chetry, broadcast journalist
- Manita Devkota, model
- Kiran Gajmer, singer
- Jane Dipika Garrett, model and body positivity advocate
- Richa Ghimire, actress
- Arthur Gunn, singer
- Prabal Gurung, fashion designer
- Resh Marhatta, actor
- Bartika Eam Rai, singer
- Saranga Shrestha, actress
- Tenzing Norgay Trainor, actor
- Daya Vaidya, actress
- Curtis Waters, musician

== Literature and art ==
- Pratyoush Onta, historian
- Deepak Shimkhada, art historian and adjunct professor at Chaffey College
- Samrat Upadhyay, author
- Gautama V. Vajracharya, Sanskritist

== Science and technology ==
- Bodhraj Acharya, biochemist
- Lujendra Ojha, planetary scientist and assistant Professor of Planetary Science at Rutgers University
- Ram I. Mahato, pharmaceutical scientist and professor at University of Nebraska Medical Center
- Hemanta Mishra, conservationist
- Yadav Pandit, nuclear physicist
- Parag Pathak, economist and professor at Massachusetts Institute of Technology
- Dona Sarkar, software engineer
- Bhaskar Thapa, tunnel engineer

== Politics ==
- Harry Bhandari, member of Maryland House of Delegates, first Nepali-American state legislator
- Sarahana Shrestha, member of New York State Assembly

== Sports ==
- Prithu Baskota, cricketer
- Kanishka Chaugai, cricketer
- Pradip Humagain, soccer coach
- Basanta Regmi, cricketer
- Ang Dorje Sherpa, mountaineer
- Lhakpa Sherpa, mountaineer
- Debendra Thapa, boxer
