= List of Somali Americans =

This is a list of Somali Americans.

== Fashion ==
- Halima Aden, fashion model
- Jawahir Ahmed, fashion model and beauty pageant winner
- Iman, supermodel, actress and entrepreneur
- Muna Khalif, fashion designer and legislator; MP in the Federal Parliament of Somalia
- Fatima Siad, fashion model

== Media ==
- Mona Kosar Abdi, multimedia journalist
- Barkhad Abdi, actor, film director and producer
- Fathia Absie, broadcaster, writer and filmmaker
- Faysal Ahmed, actor
- Said Salah Ahmed, playwright, poet, educator and filmmaker
- Alisha Boe, actress
- Idil Ibrahim, film director, producer and entrepreneur; founder of Zeila Films
- Barni Ahmed Qaasim, multimedia artist and filmmaker
- Abdirahman Yabarow, journalist

== Society and politics ==
- Abdi Warsame, politician; former member of the Minneapolis City Council
- Abdinur Sheikh Mohamed, educator and politician; former Minister of Education of Somalia
- Abdirizak Bihi, social activist
- Abukar Arman, political analyst, writer and diplomat; former Special Envoy of Somalia to the U.S.
- Ahmed M. Hassan, entrepreneur and politician; member of the Clarkston City Council
- Anisa Hajimumin, politician, social activist and writer; Minister of Women & Family Affairs of Puntland
- Anquam Mahamoud, member-elect of the Minnesota House of Representatives
- Asha Ahmed Abdalla, politician; member of the Transitional Federal Parliament
- Ayaan Hirsi Ali, writer, political activist, former legislator
- Deqa Dhalac, member of the Maine House of Representatives
- Fatima Jibrell, environmental activist; co-founder of Adeso
- Hamse Warfa, politician and businessman
- Hassan Ali Mire, politician; former Minister of Education of Somalia
- Hodan Hassan, member of the Minnesota House of Representatives
- Hussein Sheikh Abdirahman, politician and judge; former Minister of Defence of Somalia
- Ilhan Omar, U.S. representative for Minnesota's 5th congressional district
- Ismail Ali Ismail, writer and former diplomat
- Ismail Mohamed (Ohio politician), member of the Ohio House of Representatives
- Jamal Osman, member of the Minneapolis City Council
- Kayse Jama, Majority Leader of the Oregon State Senate
- Mana Abdi, member of the Maine House of Representatives
- Mohamed Abdullahi Mohamed, diplomat, professor and politician; former President of Somalia
- Mohamed Abshir Waldo, journalist, activist, and former politician
- Mohamud Noor, member of the Minnesota House of Representatives
- Munira Abdullahi, member of the Ohio House of Representatives
- Nadia Mohamed, Minnesota municipal politician; mayor of St. Louis Park
- Nimco Ahmed, political activist
- Omar Fateh, member of the Minnesota Senate
- Raqiya Haji Dualeh Abdalla, sociologist and politician; President of the Somali Family Care Network
- Safiya Khalid, former member of the Lewiston, Maine City Council
- Samakab Hussein, member of the Minnesota House of Representatives
- Yusuf Yusuf, politician; member of the Maine House of Representatives
- Zaynab Mohamed, member of the Minnesota Senate

== Science ==
- Ali Said Faqi, scientist
- Anisa Ibrahim, medical doctor
- Musse Olol, engineer and social activist; Chairman of the Somali American Council of Oregon

== Sport ==
- Bilqis Abdul-Qaadir, basketball player
- Hassan Mead, cross country and track and field athlete
- Omar Mohamed, professional footballer for FC Cincinnati in the USL

== Finance ==
- Yussur A.F. Abrar, economist and entrepreneur; former Governor of the Central Bank of Somalia
- Abdirahman Beyle, economist; former Minister of Foreign Affairs of Somalia
- Abdiweli Gaas, economist and politician; President of Puntland
- Abdusalam H. Omer, economist; Minister of Foreign Affairs of Somalia
- Hussein Samatar, banker and community organizer
- Said Sheikh Samatar, scholar, historian and writer

== Creative ==
- Ali Jimale Ahmed, scholar, poet and writer
- Nuruddin Farah, writer
- Lexi Jones, artist and singer-songwriter
- Ladan Osman, poet and teacher
- Ahmed Ismail Samatar, professor, politician and writer
- Sofia Samatar, professor, editor and writer
- Saado Ali Warsame, singer-songwriter and politician

== Religion ==
- Fardosa Hassan, chaplain

== See also ==
- List of Somalis
