= Nimco Ahmed =

Somali political activist

Nimco Ahmed نمعة أحمد
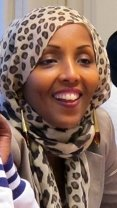
- Born: May 1, 1972 (age 54); Somalia
- Occupation: Political activist
- Title: State Director for the Minnesota Democratic–Farmer–Labor Party

Nimco Ahmed (Somali: Nimco Axmed, Arabic: نمعة أحمد) is a Somali-American political activist based in Minneapolis, Minnesota.

== Career ==
As of 2014, Ahmed served as the State Director for the Minnesota Democratic–Farmer–Labor Party (DFL). In this capacity, she facilitated caucus training through the DFL Somali Caucus.

Ahmed is also a policy aide for the vice president of the Minneapolis City Council. Additionally, she co-founded the Minnesota League of Young Voters, as well as the FATA non-profit organization.

From 2009 to 2010, Ahmed was a policy fellow at the Humphrey Institute of Public Affairs at the University of Minnesota. She was likewise selected as one of two young "Women to Watch" by the Minnesota Women's Political Caucus. Besides political work, Ahmed serves on the board of several organizations, including the board of the reNEW Minnesota campaign and the Minneapolis Community Action Circle of Discipline's board of directors.
