= Sammarinese Americans =

Americans of Sammarinese birth or descent

Total population
- 538 (ancestry and ethnic origin; 2000 Census); 2,910 (Sammarinese-born, 2014)

Regions with significant populations
- New York City and Michigan (Detroit and Troy)

Languages
- English, Italian, Romagnol

Religion
- Christianity (Roman Catholicism)

Related ethnic groups
- Italian Americans

Sammarinese Americans (Italian: Americani sammarinesi) are Americans of Sammarinese descent.

The largest Sammarinese-American communities are in Michigan, mostly in the cities of Troy and Detroit. Sammarinese immigrants in Troy established institutions such as the San Marino Club and Re Monti Stentorian.

== History ==
Until the early twentieth century, few people from San Marino emigrated to the United States. However, the number of Sammarinese immigrants in the US increased significantly, with most emigrating to the United States to escape poverty, carrying with them expectations of social and economic improvement.

Most of the immigrants who arrived after the First World War emigrated because they had relatives there, and acquired jobs through them. Between those years, the United States imposed several restrictive laws against immigration, such as the Quota Act (promulgated in 1921), which regulated the entry of immigrants by limiting their numbers by quota (the number of allowed immigrants from San Marino to US was at maximum 100). In the first Quota Act, Sammarinese migrants were counted in the Italian quota, however after 1924 San Marino was recognized as an independent European state.

The immigrants had to undergo medical examinations to verify physical and mental fitness. This set of obligations and limits together with the effects of the 1929 crash, reduced the number of Sammarinese emigrants. During these years, most Sammarinese emigrated to New York City and Detroit, as well as Sandusky, Ohio. Most Sammarinese then worked as dishwashers and tilers. In addition, Sammarinese women began to work out of their homes from the 50s and 60s as textile workers, working in both the factory and home.

== Press and associations ==
On September 3, 1929, the newspaper San Marino in New York, bringing news of that country, was first published. Several migrant associations of San Marino in the United States that aimed to help their compatriots in various aspects of their lives: the mortgage, illness, care among members and families, and maintaining traditions. Sammarinese associations include San Marino Social Club, founded in 1938 in Troy, and the San Marino Community of New York.

== Notable people ==
- Myles Amine, freestyle wrestler born in Ann Arbor, Michigan, who competes for San Marino.
- Matt Cross, professional wrestler

== See also ==
- San Marino–United States relations
