= Ram I. Mahato =

Nepalese-American scientist (born 1963)

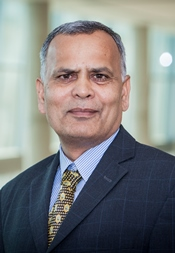
- Born: January 11, 1963; Janakpurdham, Nepal
- Education: University of Strathclyde; China Pharmaceutical University
- Scientific career
- Fields: Polymeric Nanomedicine, drug delivery

Ram I. Mahato (born January 11, 1963) is a Nepalese-American pharmaceutical scientist. He is the Parke-Davis Endowed Professor in the Department of Pharmaceutical Sciences at the University of Nebraska Medical Center (UNMC) in Omaha, Nebraska. He served as the chair of the department from 2013 to 2025.

== Education and career ==
Mahato completed his Bachelor of Science from China Pharmaceutical University in Nanjing and earned his Ph.D. in drug delivery from the University of Strathclyde in Glasgow, Scotland, in 1992.

Following his doctoral studies, he worked as a postdoctoral fellow at Kyoto University in Japan, Washington University in St. Louis, and the University of Southern California in Los Angeles. He subsequently served as a senior scientist at GeneMedicine Inc. and as a research assistant professor at the University of Utah. Before joining the faculty at UNMC, he was a Professor of nanomedicines and drug delivery at the University of Tennessee Health Science Center (UTHSC) in Memphis, Tennessee, where he also received an Excellence in Teaching award. He joined UNMC as a professor and the chair of the department of pharmaceutical sciences effective June 1, 2013.

Mahato is a Fellow of the American Association of Pharmaceutical Scientists (AAPS) and a Fellow of the Controlled Release Society (CRS). He served as a permanent member of the Bioengineering, Technology, and Surgical Sciences (BTSS) study section at the National Institutes of Health (NIH) from 2009 to 2013. Furthermore, he was a Feature Editor of Pharmaceutical Research from 2006 to 2013 and an Associate Editor of the Journal of Neuroimmune Pharmacology.

== Research ==
Mahato's research focuses on a multidisciplinary approach combining polymer or lipid chemistry, biophysics, and molecular biology to develop advanced drug delivery systems. His laboratory specializes in polymeric micelle and nanoparticulate drug delivery, alongside the synthesis of novel polymers, lipopeptides, lipopolymers, and cationic and ionizable lipids. These methodologies are investigated for therapeutic applications in liver fibrosis, type 1 diabetes (specifically islet transplantation), and various cancers, including pancreatic, prostate, melanoma, and medulloblastoma.

His published research includes work on:

- The development of phosphodiesterase 4B (PDE4B) inhibitors for treating chronic liver injury and metabolic-dysfunction associated diseases.
- The role of microRNAs (miRNAs) and small molecules, such as hedgehog and microtubule inhibitors, as anti-cancer therapies.
- The design of combination therapies involving BRD4 and PI3K inhibitors using polymeric nanoparticles for treating acute myeloid leukemia.

He holds 3 US patents and has edited or written several books, including Organ Specific Drug Delivery and Targeting to the Lungs and Pharmaceutical Perspectives of Cancer Therapeutics.
