= Cossack Americans =

Americans of Cossack birth or descent

Total population
- 80,000

Languages
- American English, Russian, Ukrainian

Religion
- Christianity

Cossacks in the United States or Cossack Americans are American citizens of Cossack descent. A number of them self-identify as Cossacks in the US censuses. A number of people culturally identify themselves as Cossacks.

== Notable people ==
- Serge Jaroff
- Emilio Kosterlitzky
