= List of Dutch Americans =

The first Dutch settlers arrived in America in 1624 and founded a number of villages, a town called New Amsterdam and the Colony of New Netherland on the East Coast. New Amsterdam became New York when the Treaty of Breda was signed in 1667. According to the 2006 United States Census, more than 5 million Americans claim total or partial Dutch heritage. Today the majority of the Dutch Americans live in the U.S. states of California, New York, Michigan, Iowa, Washington, Minnesota, Wisconsin, Montana, Ohio and Pennsylvania.

This is a list of notable Dutch Americans, including both original immigrants who obtained American citizenship and Americans of full or partial Dutch ancestry.

== List ==
=== Arts and literature ===
- Earl W. Bascom (1906–1995), artist, sculptor, inventor, author, known as the "dean of rodeo cowboy sculpture"
- Edward W. Bok (1863–1930), author, publisher, editor of Ladies Home Journal
- Pearl S. Buck (1892–1973), writer and novelist, first American woman to win the Nobel Prize in Literature
- Willem de Kooning (1904–1997), abstract expressionist painter
- Peter DeVries (1910–1993), author and editor; wrote Tunnel of Love; editor and staffer for Poetry magazine and The New Yorker
- Barthold Fles (1902–1989), literary agent, author, editor, translator and publisher
- Charles Fort (1874–1932), author, wrote Book of the Damned, father of ufology, cryptozoology and critic/satirist of mainstream, dogmatic science
- Frederick Franck (1909–2006), painter, sculptor, and author of 30 books who was known for his interest in human spirituality
- Marius Jansen (1922–2000), American academic, historian, and Emeritus Professor of Japanese History at Princeton University.
- Herman Melville (1819–1891), author and poet, wrote Moby Dick
- Milton J. Nieuwsma (born 1941), author, film writer and producer
- Erwin Timmers (born 1964), Dutch-American environmental "green artist", glass sculptor and teacher
- Raeburn van Buren, magazine and comic strip illustrator best known for his work on the syndicated Abbie an' Slats
- Wallace Stevens (1879–1955), modernist poet
- Edward Stratemeyer, (1862–1930), author
- Janwillem van de Wetering (1931–2008), Dutch-American author of police procedurals, Zen autobiographies and children's books
- Philip Van Doren Stern (1900–1984), author
- Hendrik Willem Van Loon (1882–1944), author, historian and journalist
- Gloria Vanderbilt (1924–2019), artist and socialite
- Walt Whitman (1819–1892), poet
- Jeff VanderMeer (born 1968), author

=== Entertainment ===
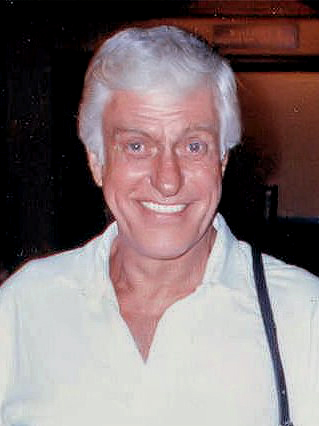
Dick Van Dyke

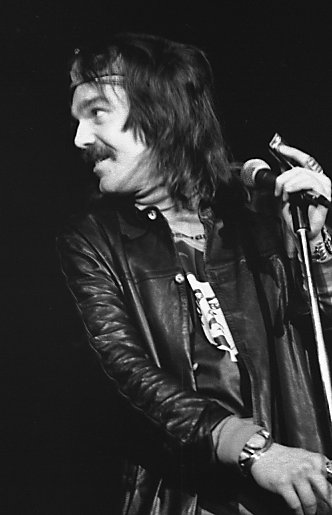
Don Van Vliet (Captain Beefheart)

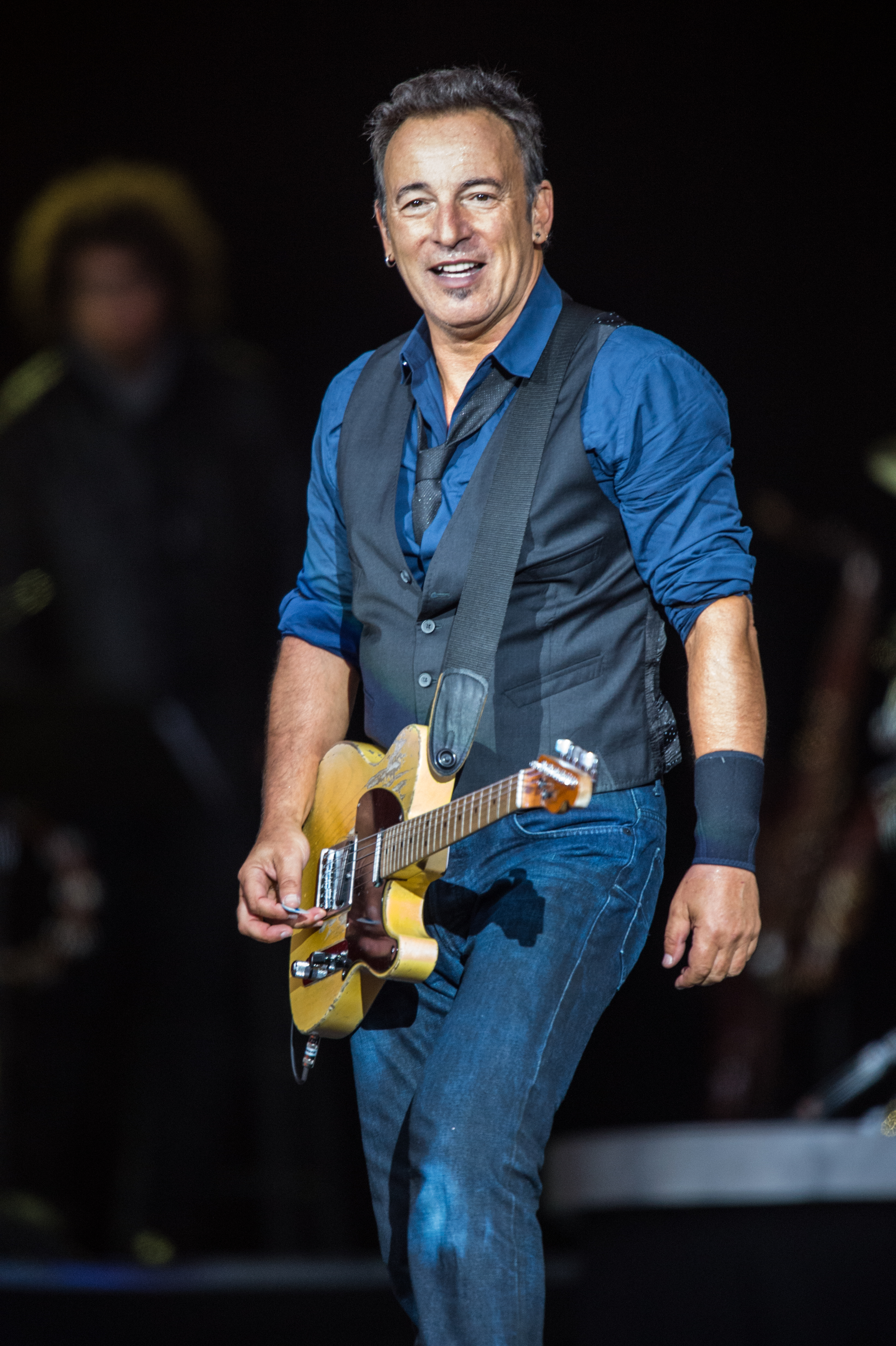
Bruce Springsteen

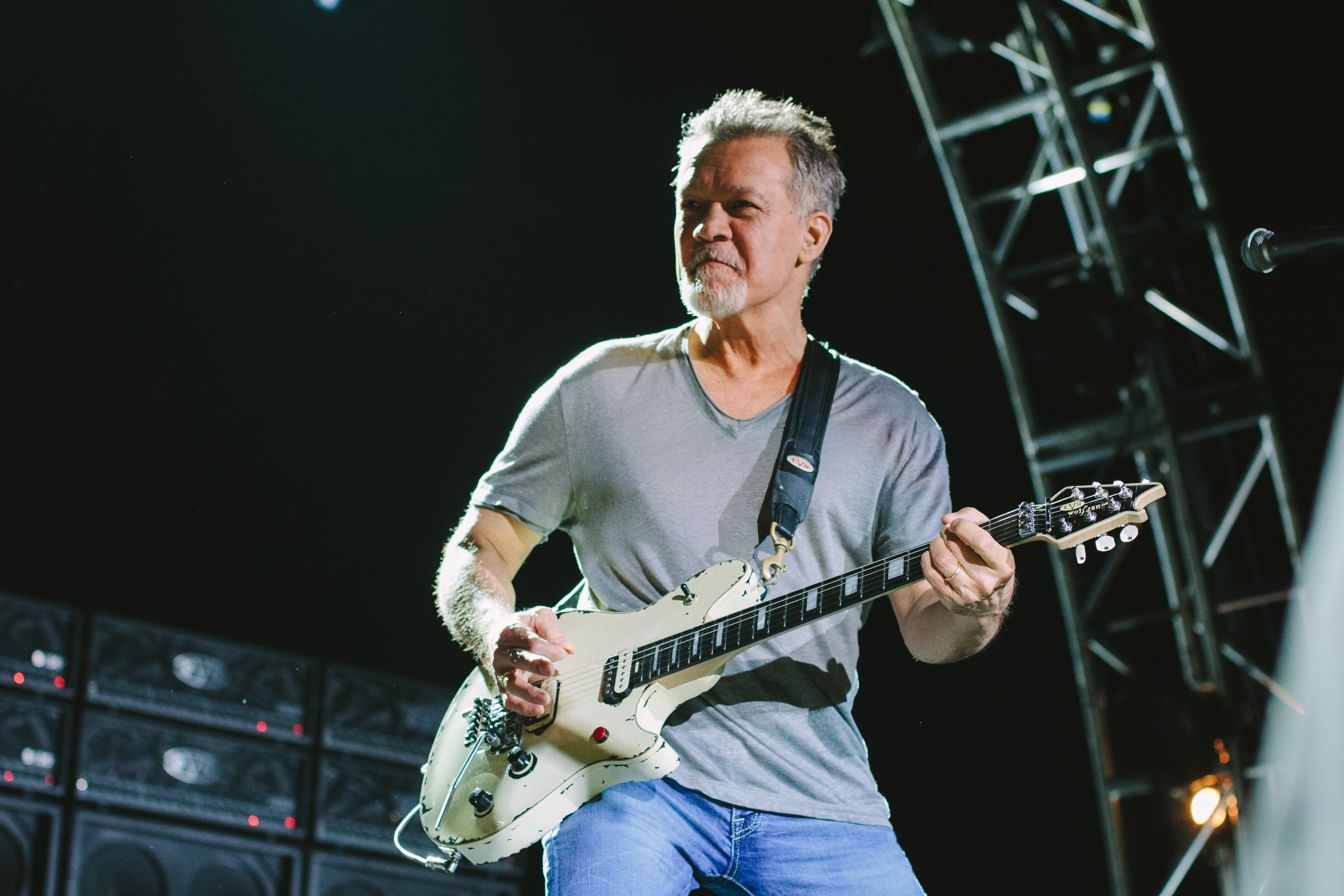
Eddie Van Halen

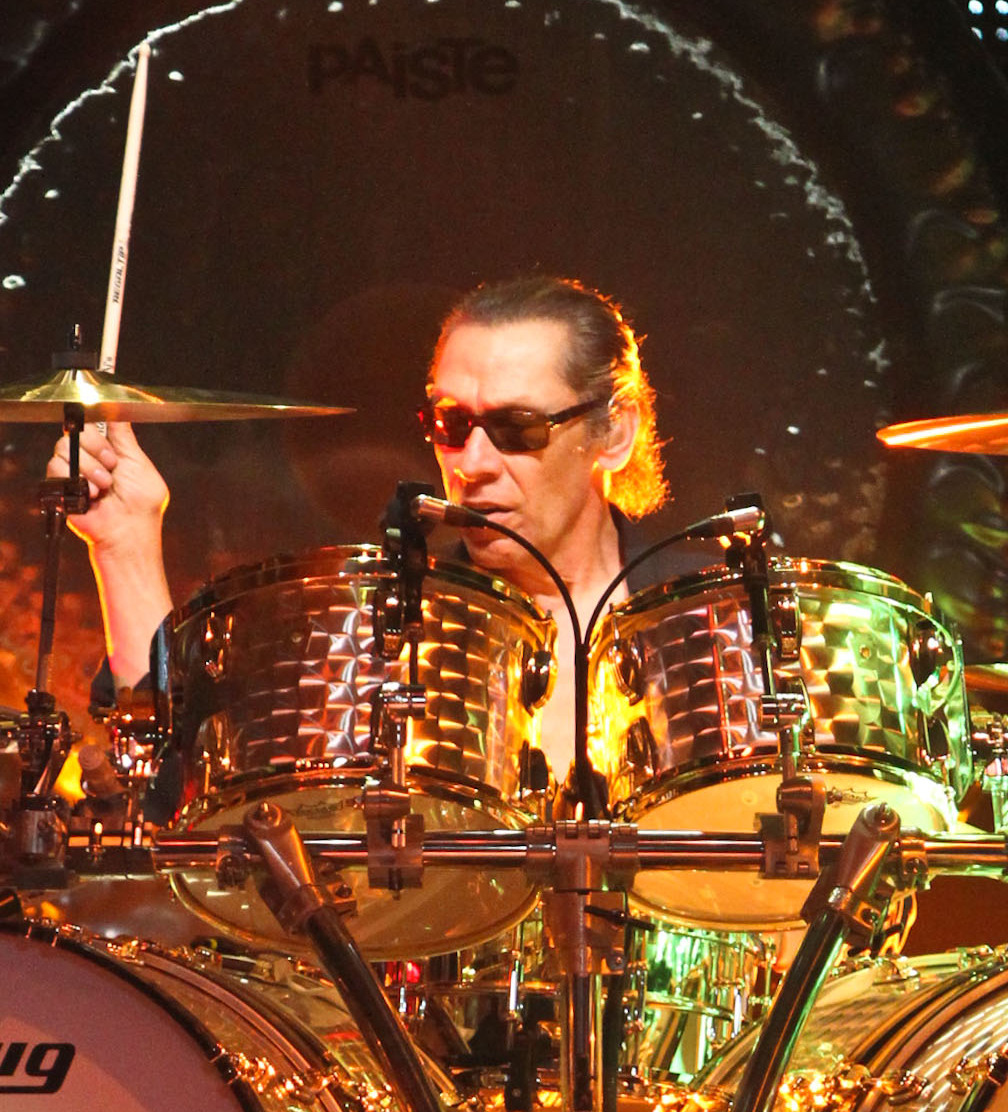
Alex Van Halen

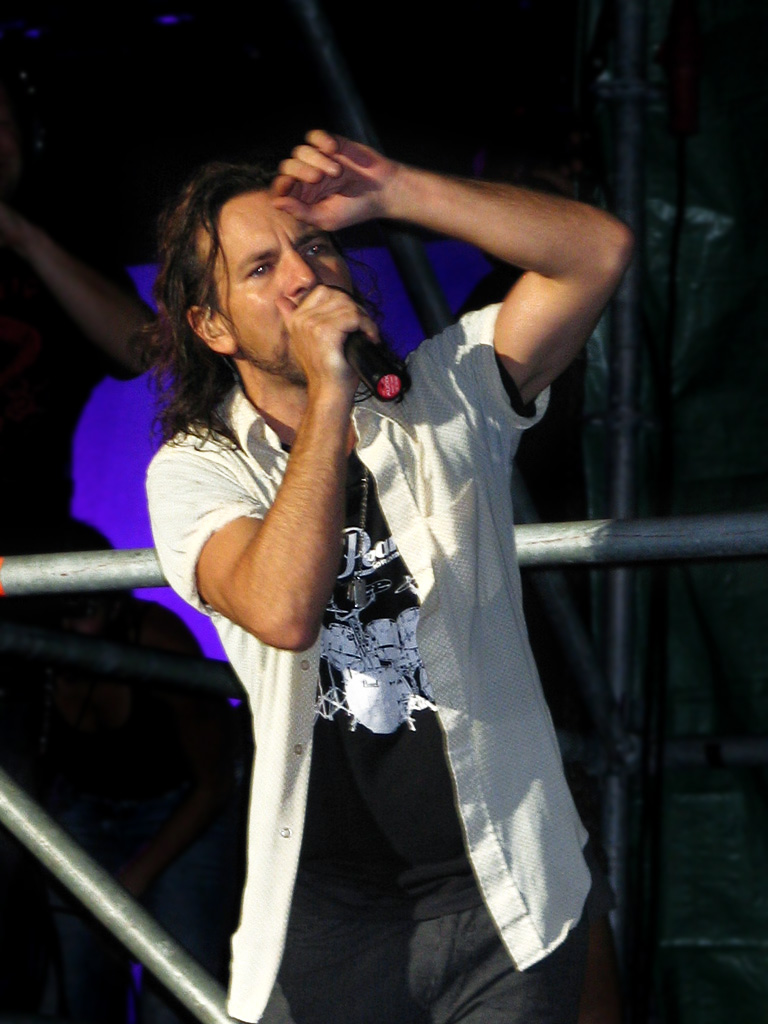
Eddie Vedder

- Christina Aguilera (born 1980), singer, actress and model, partly of Dutch descent through her mother
- Alison Brie (born 1982), actress, partly of Dutch descent through her father
- Dan Aykroyd (born 1952), actor
- Reiko Aylesworth (born 1972), actress, best known for playing Michelle Dessler in the television series 24
- Earl Bascom (1906–1995), cowboy actor in "Lawless Rider" and a descendant of the Coerten and Cos families of New Jersey
- Aaron Paul (born 1979), actor
- Carmit Bachar (born 1974), member of the Pussycat Dolls, born to an Israeli father and Dutch-Indonesian mother
- Beck Bennett (born 1984), actor and comedian, distant Dutch ancestry
- Shannon Bex (born 1980), member of Danity Kane; of Scottish and Dutch descent
- Moon Bloodgood (born 1975), actress (father has a small amount of Dutch ancestry)
- Humphrey Bogart (1899–1957), actor (father was of part Dutch descent; "Bogart" comes from the Dutch surname Bogaert, derived from "bogaard", short for "boomgaard", which means "orchard")
- Hobart Bosworth (1867–1943), actor, director, writer and producer
- Michelle Branch (born 1983), singer (Dutch through her maternal grandfather)
- Marlon Brando (1924–2004), Hollywood film actor; father was of partial Dutch ancestry
- Clancy Brown (born 1959), actor
- Steve Buscemi (born 1957), actor, writer and director, mother had some Dutch ancestry
- Captain Beefheart (1941–2010), stage name of musician and artist Don Van Vliet
- David Carradine (1936–2009), actor, distant Dutch ancestry
- Ever Carradine (born 1974), actress and daughter of Robert Carradine, distant Dutch ancestry
- John Carradine (1906–1988), actor, distant Dutch ancestry; descended from Dutch diamond merchant Kiliaen van Rensselaer, who settled the province of Albany, New York, in the seventeenth century
- Keith Carradine (born 1949), actor and son of John Carradine, distant Dutch ancestry
- Robert Carradine (born 1954), actor, distant Dutch ancestry
- Montgomery Clift (1920–1966), actor, of partial maternal Dutch ancestry
- Wilhelmina Cooper (née Behmenburg) (1939–1980), model who began with Ford Models; at the peak of her success she founded her own agency, Wilhelmina Models
- Jan de Bont (born 1943), film director, producer and cinematographer
- Robert De Niro (born 1943), two-time Academy Award-winning actor, mother of part Dutch descent
- Dane DeHaan (born 1986), film actor, paternal great-grandfather was of Dutch descent
- Thomas Dekker (born 1987), actor, his paternal great-grandfather was of Dutch descent
- Cecil B. DeMille (1881–1959), film director and producer
- Emily Deschanel (born 1976), actress best known for her role as Dr. Temperance "Bones" Brennan in the comedy-crime drama series Bones, distant Dutch ancestry
- Zooey Deschanel (born 1980), actress, distant Dutch ancestry
- Joyce DeWitt (born 1949), actress
- Michael Douglas (born 1944), actor and producer who won four Golden Globes and two Academy Awards, distant Dutch ancestry on mother's side
- Clint Eastwood (born 1930), Academy Award-winning film actor, director and producer, distant Dutch ancestry
- Kurt Cobain (1967-1994), singer, guitarist, Dutch ancestry from his mother
- Frances Farmer (1913–1970), film actress, her mother was of Dutch ancestry
- Melissa Ferlaak (born 1979), soprano singer and vocal coach, distant Dutch ancestry (original spelling of her surname was Verlaak)
- Nina Foch (1924–2008), film actress, father was from the Netherlands
- Bridget Fonda (born 1964), actress, daughter of Peter Fonda, best known for her roles in The Godfather Part III and Jackie Brown, father of part Dutch descent
- Henry Fonda (1905–1982), Academy Award-winning film actor, father of Peter and Jane Fonda, was of part Dutch descent
- Jane Fonda (born 1937), Academy Award-winning actress, daughter of Henry Fonda, father was of part Dutch descent
- Peter Fonda (1940–2019), actor, best known for his role as "Wyatt" in the 1960s counterculture classic Easy Rider, father was of part Dutch descent
- Ace Frehley (born 1951), musician, Dutch on paternal side
- G-Eazy, (born 1989), rapper
- Troy Garity (born 1973), actor; son of Jane Fonda; best known for his roles in the television movie Soldier's Girl and the Barbershop films
- Janina Gavankar (born 1980), actress of Indian and Dutch ancestry
- George Gaynes (1917–2016), actor and singer, father was Dutch
- Paul Giamatti (born 1967), actor, distant Dutch ancestry
- Mark-Paul Gosselaar (born 1974), actor, perhaps best known for his role as Zack Morris on NBC's Saved by the Bell; his father is of Dutch Jewish and German descent, and his mother is of Dutch-Indonesian descent
- Lucas Grabeel (born 1984), American actor, distant Dutch ancestry, best known for his role as Ryan Evans in High School Musical
- Betty Grable (1916–1973), actress, singer, dancer and pin-up girl whose sensational bathing-suit photo became the number one pinup of the World War II era
- Bella Hadid (born 1996), model
- Gigi Hadid (born 1995), model
- Rebecca Hall (born 1982), maternal grandmother was Dutch
- Philip Seymour Hoffman (1967–2014), actor, distant Dutch ancestry
- Whitney Houston (1963–2012), actor, singer, distant Dutch ancestry
- Bryce Dallas Howard (born 1981), actress; daughter of director Ron Howard; distant Dutch ancestry
- Clint Howard (born 1959), actor and brother of director Ron Howard, distant Dutch ancestry
- Ron Howard (born 1954), Academy Award-winning director, producer and actor, best known for directing Apollo 13, How the Grinch Stole Christmas and A Beautiful Mind, distant Dutch ancestry
- Michiel Huisman (born 1981), actor, musician, singer-songwriter, best known for his roles in Game of Thrones and The Age of Adaline
- Noname Jane, pornographic actress
- Laura Jansen (born 1977), singer-songwriter (born in Breda, the Netherlands, based in Los Angeles, California)
- Famke Janssen (born 1964), fashion model and actress, best known for her roles as Bond girl Xenia Onatopp in GoldenEye, Jean Grey in the X-Men film series, and Lenore Mills in Taken and Taken 2
- Angelina Jolie (born 1975), actress; her mother had French Canadian, German, and Dutch ancestry
- Kylie Jenner (born 1997), reality star, social media personality and socialite best known for her best seller makeup line Kylie Cosmetics
- Charles Judels (1882–1969), actor
- Kim Kardashian (born 1980), actress and model; appeared in Disaster Movie; distant Dutch ancestry
- Kris Kristofferson (born 1936), actor and singer
- Eva LaRue (born 1966), actress of Scottish, French, and Dutch ancestry; played Dr. Maria Santos on All My Children, and CSI: Miami detective Natalia Boa Vista
- Taylor Lautner (born 1992), actor, best known from his role as Jacob Black in the Twilight Saga film series, has some Dutch ancestry
- Kellan Lutz (born 1985), actor, small amount of Dutch ancestry
- Tim McGraw, country singer, small amount of Dutch ancestry
- Meghan Markle (born 1981), actress, model and humanitarian, of part Dutch descent on her father's side
- Leighton Meester (born 1986), actress, best known for her role as Blair Waldorf in Gossip Girl, of part Dutch descent on father's side
- Wentworth Miller (born 1972), actor and model best known his role as Michael Scofield on the television series Prison Break, small amount of Dutch ancestry
- Steve Oedekerk (born 1961), actor and comedian, paternal grandfather was Afrikaner of Dutch descent
- Colonel Tom Parker (1909–1997), manager of Elvis Presley
- Michelle Pfeiffer (born 1958), actress, best known for her roles in Scarface, Dangerous Liaisons, The Fabulous Baker Boys, Batman Returns and Grease 2; paternal grandmother was of part Dutch descent,
- Ryan Potter (born 1995), actor; mother of part Dutch descent
- Bill Pullman (born 1953), actor, best known for his roles in Ruthless People, Spaceballs, Independence Day, While You Were Sleeping and Lost Highway; maternal grandparents were Dutch
- Jason Ritter (born 1980), actor, distant Dutch ancestry
- John Ritter (1948–2003), actor, distant Dutch ancestry
- Rebecca Romijn (born 1972), actress and fashion model, best known for her role as Mystique in the X-Men film series, of 3/4 Dutch descent
- Thelma Schoonmaker (born 1940), three-time Academy Award-winning film editor, best known for editing all of Martin Scorsese's movies since Raging Bull, of part Dutch ancestry
- Jane Seymour (born 1951), actress; best known as Bond girl in Live and Let Die and as Dr. Quinn Medicine Woman; has a Dutch mother
- Michael Sinterniklaas, voice actor and founder of NYAV Post, a New York recording studio
- Jimmy Smits (born 1955), Golden Globe and Emmy-winning actor; half Dutch, half Puerto Rican
- Cobie Smulders (born 1982), actress and model of Dutch and English descent
- Martin Spanjers (born 1987), actor best known for playing Rory Hennessy on the sitcom 8 Simple Rules
- Bruce Springsteen (born 1949), singer-songwriter, distant Dutch ancestry
- Carel Struycken (born 1948), film actor
- Taylor Swift (born 1989), country and pop singer, distant Dutch ancestry
- Lou Tellegen (1881–1934), film actor
- Shirley Temple (1928–2013), actress
- Charlize Theron (born 1975), South African actress of German, Dutch and French descent, now naturalized citizen of the United States
- Egbert Van Alstyne (1878–1951), songwriter and pianist
- Louis van Amstel (born 1972), professional dancer, choreographer, dancesport coach
- Amedee J. Van Beuren (1879–1938), film producer
- Rayna Vallandingham, actress and martial artist, of Dutch descent
- Lee Van Cleef (1925–1989), WWII warhero, painter and film actor, best known for his parts as a villain in Spaghetti Western movies. Both parents (father Van Cleef and mother Van Fleet) were of Dutch descent
- Anneliese van der Pol (born 1984), television actress, perhaps best known for her role as Chelsea Daniels in the Disney Channel original comedy series, That's So Raven
- Grace VanderWaal (born 2004), singer and musician
- Casper Van Dien (born 1968), actor, of part Dutch descent
- Barry Van Dyke (born 1951), actor and son of Dick Van Dyke
- Dick Van Dyke (born 1925), famous television and film star; brother of Jerry Van Dyke
- Jerry Van Dyke (1931–2018), television actor; brother of Dick Van Dyke
- W. S. Van Dyke (1889–1943), director
- Alex Van Halen (born 1953), drummer and founding member of the hard rock band Van Halen
- Eddie Van Halen (1955–2020), guitarist and founding member of the hard rock band Van Halen
- Dick Van Patten (1928–2015), actor of part Dutch descent
- Tim Van Patten (born 1959), director, producer, actor and screenwriter
- Gus Van Sant (born 1952), director
- Edward Van Sloan (1882–1964), actor
- Andrew Van Wyngarden (born 1983), musician of Dutch descent
- Billy Van Zandt (born 1957), playwright, actor
- Philip Van Zandt (1904–1958), Broadway and Hollywood actor
- Townes Van Zandt (1944–1997), country-folk music singer-songwriter, performer, and poet
- Donnie Van Zant (born 1952), founder and singer of .38 Special
- Johnny Van Zant (born 1959), lead singer of Lynyrd Skynyrd since 1987
- Ronnie Van Zant (1948–1977), lead singer of Lynyrd Skynyrd from 1970 to 1977
- Paul Verhoeven (born 1938), film director
- Donald Voorhees (1903–1989), composer and conductor
- Dionne Warwick (born 1940), singer, actress and TV show host; became a United Nations Global Ambassador for the Food and Agriculture Organization and a United States Ambassador of Health; distant Dutch ancestry
- Brandon deWilde (1942-1972), American theater, film, and television actor
- Rainn Wilson (born 1966), actor of Dutch descent through mother
- Kristen Schaal (born 1978), actress and comedian of Dutch Lutheran descent
- Steven Seagal (born 1952), actor, of Dutch descent through his mother
- Noah Centineo (born 1996), actor, To All the Boys I've Loved Before & Sierra Burgess Is a Loser. He is of Dutch descent.
- Lauren German (born 1979), actress, Lucifer (TV series). She has a paternal grandfather who was Dutch and born in Amsterdam circa 1909.
- Lesley-Ann Brandt (born 1981), actress, Lucifer (TV series). Of Dutch descent together with German, Spanish and Indian.

=== Journalism ===
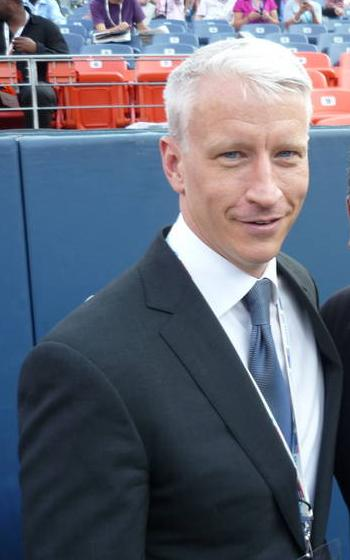
Anderson Cooper

- Rachel Maddow (born 1973), MSNBC journalist, paternal grandmother is of Dutch descent
- Anderson Cooper (born 1967), CNN journalist, mother is Dutch-American socialite Gloria Vanderbilt
- Walter Cronkite (1916–2009), CBS Evening News journalist
- Watson Spoelstra (1910–1999), sportswriter for the Detroit News, grandfather of Erik Spoelstra
- Greta Van Susteren (born 1954), Fox News journalist
- Michiel Vos (born 1970), journalist, made documentary Diary of a Political Tourist

=== Military ===
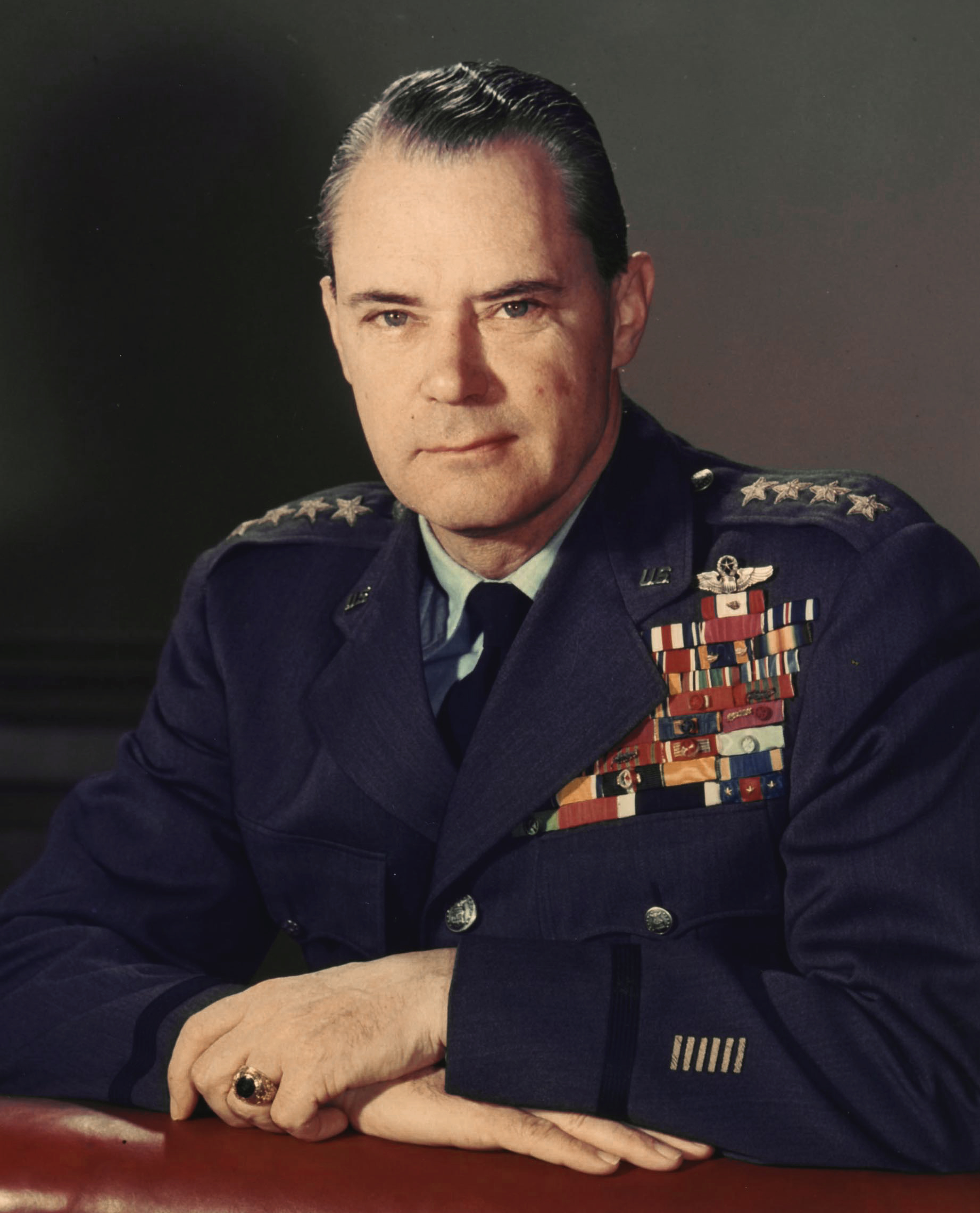
Hoyt Vandenberg

- Cornplanter (John Abeel III) (died 1836), Seneca war chief who fought in the French and Indian War and the American Revolutionary War. Great-grandson of Johannes Abeel.
- Eugene DeBruin (fl. 1933–1968), USAF sergeant; disappeared over Laos in 1968
- Franklin Van Valkenburgh (1888–1941), served as the last captain of the USS Arizona (BB-39). He was honored posthumously with a Medal of Honor following his death during the Attack on Pearl Harbor.
- John L. DeWitt (1880–1962), US four-star general during World War II
- John Bell Hood (1831–1879), Confederate general during the American Civil War
- James Longstreet (1821–1904), Confederate Lieutenant-General in the American Civil War
- Jack Robert Lousma (born 1936), retired United States Marine Corps colonel, aeronautical engineer, NASA astronaut (member of the second crew on the Skylab space station in 1973, commander STS-3, the third Space Shuttle mission), and politician (R)
- Thomas S. Moorman (1910–1997), United States Air Force Academy
- Thomas S. Moorman Jr. (1940–2020), Vice Chief of Staff of the United States Air Force
- David Petraeus (born 1952), US four-star general; commander in Iraq in 2007; his father is an immigrant from the Netherlands
- Theodore Roosevelt Jr. (1887–1944), US brigadier general; Medal of Honor; fought in both world wars
- Henry Rutgers (1745–1830), American Revolutionary War hero
- Robert M. Shoemaker (1924–2017), US four-star general during the Vietnam War
- Eric Schoomaker (born 1948), US three-star general; Surgeon General of the United States Army
- Peter Schoomaker (born 1946), US four-star general; Chief of Staff of the United States Army
- Philip John Schuyler (1733–1804), general in the American Revolution and US Senator from New York
- Earl Van Dorn (1820–1863), Confederate general during the American Civil War
- James Van Fleet (1892–1992), US four-star general; Army general during World War II and the Korean War
- Cortlandt Van Rensselaer Schuyler (1900–1993), US Army four-star general; served as chief of staff of Supreme Headquarters Allied Powers Europe from 1953 to 1959
- Daniel Van Voorhis (1878–1956), United States Army lieutenant general
- Isaac Van Wart (1759–1828), militiaman from the state of New York during the American Revolution; in 1780, he participated in the capture of Major John André
- Alexander Archer Vandegrift (1887–1973), US four-star general; Medal of Honor; 18th commandant of the US Marine Corps
- Hoyt Sanford Vandenberg (1899–1954), US four-star general during World War II; second chief of staff of US Air Force Director Central Intelligence Agency
- Jocko Willink (born 1971), US Navy SEAL retired officer, podcaster and author

=== Politics ===
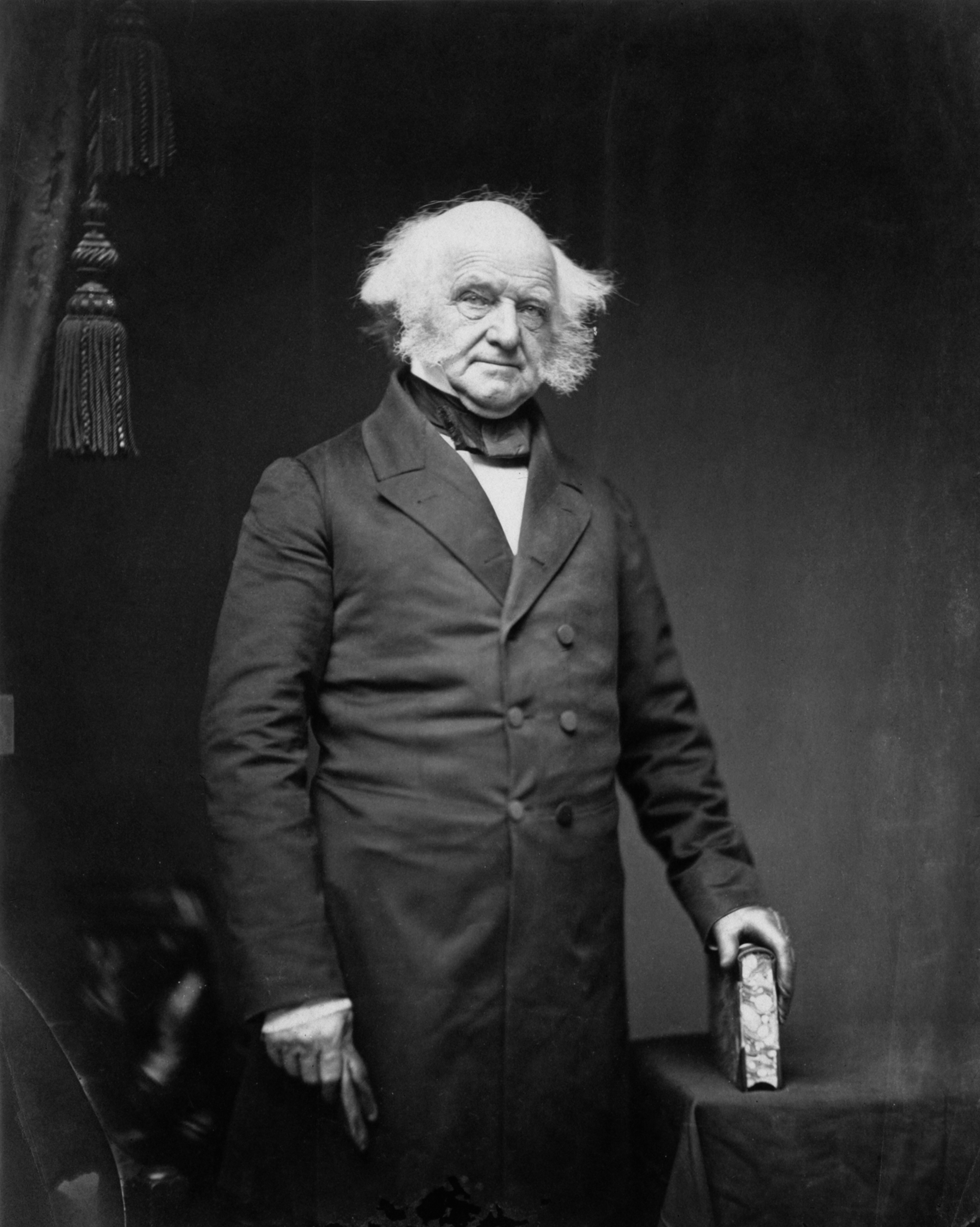
Martin van Buren

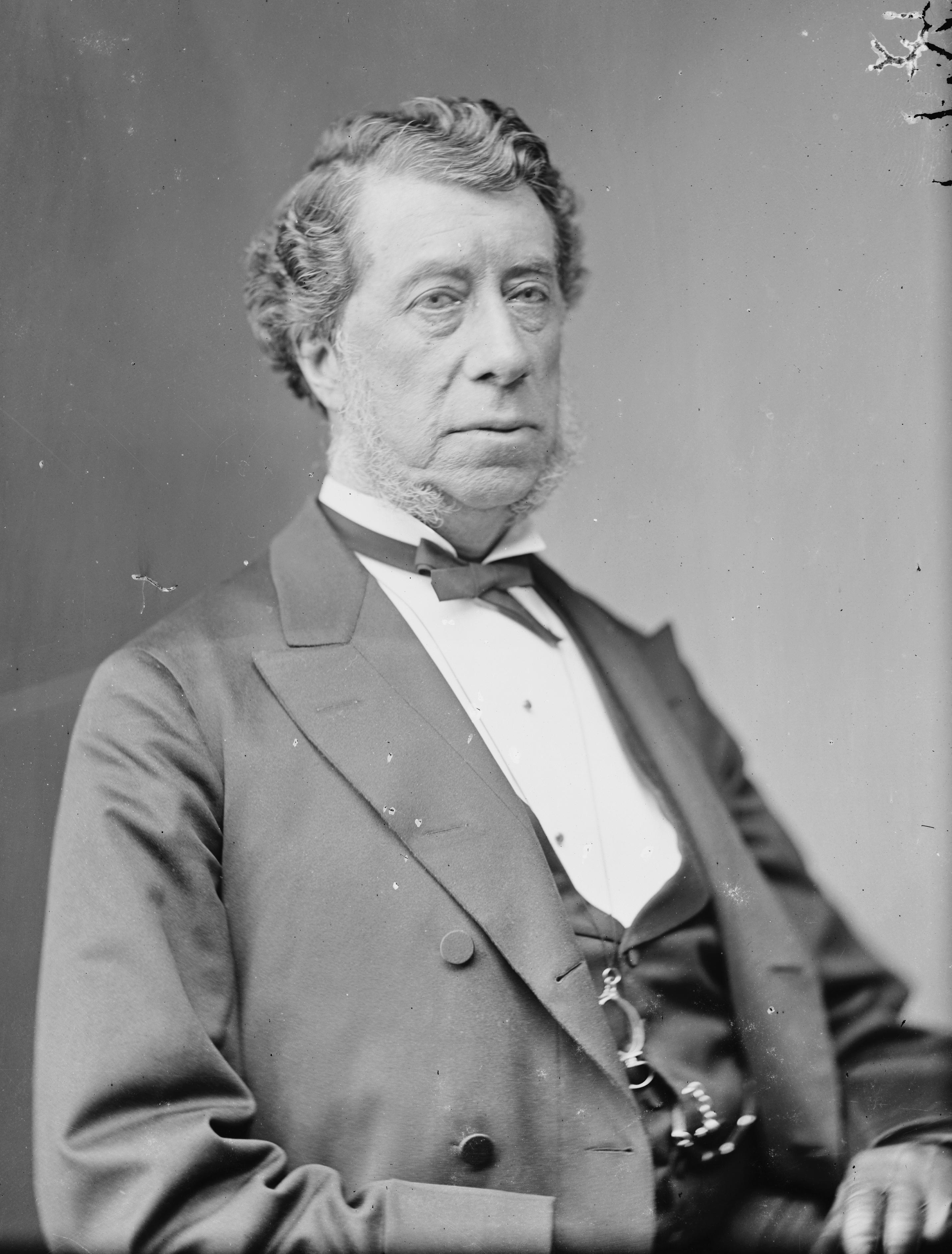
Hamilton Fish

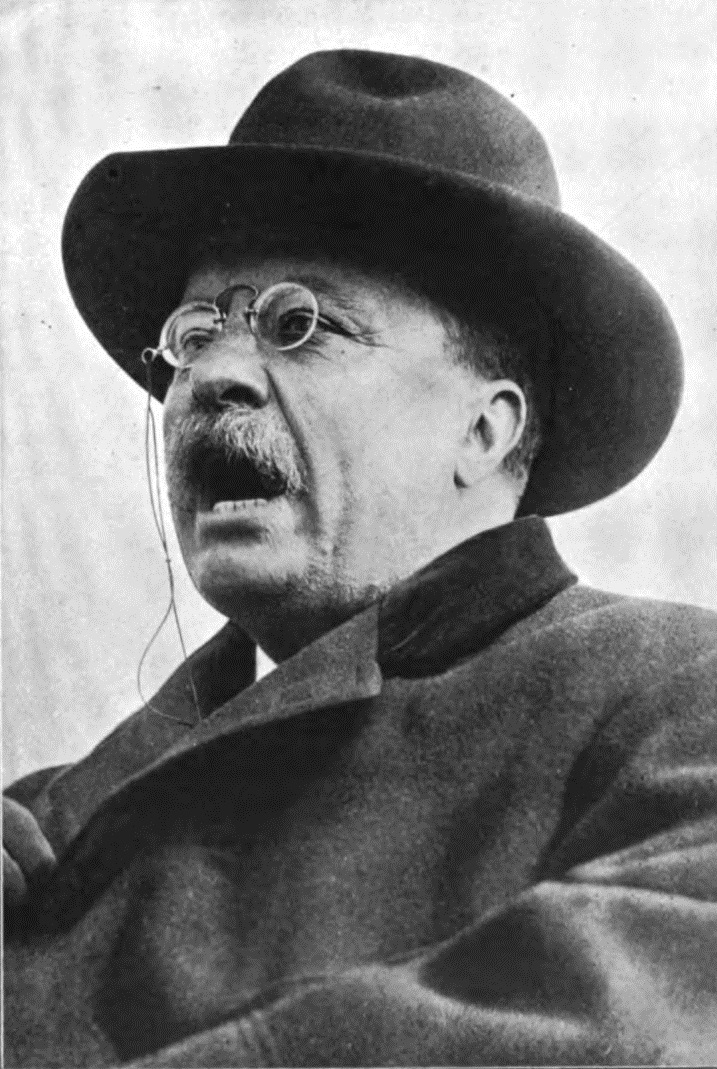
Theodore Roosevelt

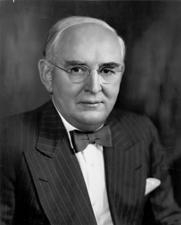
Arthur Vandenberg

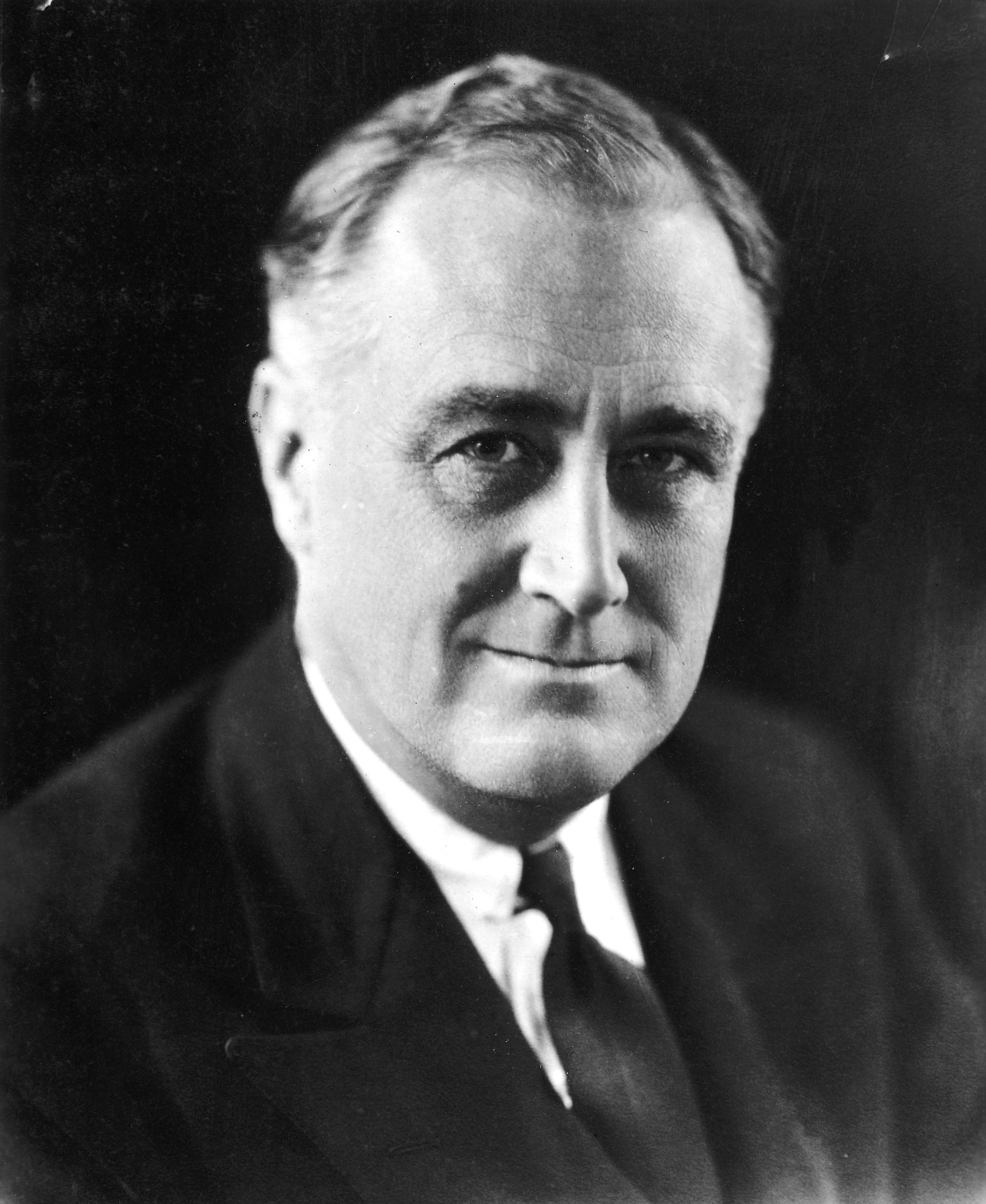
Franklin D. Roosevelt

- Johannes Abeel (1667–1711), second and thirteenth Mayor of Albany, New York
- Egbert Benson, Founding Father of the United States
- Jacob Brinkerhoff (1810–1880), United States Representative from Ohio
- George H. W. Bush (1924–2018), 41st President of the United States
- George P. Bush (born 1976), current Commissioner of the Texas General Land Office
- George W. Bush (born 1946), 43rd President of the United States
- Jeb Bush (born 1953), Governor of Florida
- Prescott Bush (1895–1972), Senator from Connecticut
- Hillary Clinton (née Rodham) (born 1947), wife of Bill Clinton; 67th United States Secretary of State
- Charles Croswell (1825–1886), Governor of Michigan
- Ivo Daalder (born 1960), 20th United States Permanent Representative to NATO
- Harry DeBoer (1905–1991), Trotskyist trade union leader
- Dick DeVos (born 1955), Republican candidate for Governor of Michigan
- Frank Ellsworth Doremus (1865–1947), United States Representative from Michigan
- Hamilton Fish, 26th United States Secretary of State
- Rodney Frelinghuysen (born 1946), United States Representative from New Jersey
- Todd Gloria (born 1978), member of the San Diego City Council
- Warren G. Harding (1865–1923), 29th President of the United States
- John Hickenlooper (born 1952), 42nd Governor of Colorado and US Senator
- Pete Hoekstra (born 1953), United States Representative from Michigan, United States Ambassador to the Netherlands, and United States Ambassador to Canada
- John Hoeven (born 1957), United States Senator from North Dakota
- Harold G. Hoffman (1896–1954), 41st Governor of New Jersey
- Bill Huizenga (born 1969), United States Representative from Michigan
- Kenny Hulshof (born 1958), United States Representative from Missouri
- Robert H. Jackson (1892–1954), 74th Associate Justice of the Supreme Court
- John Jay (1745–1829), Founding Father of the United States, United States Secretary of State and 1st Chief Justice of the United States
- Bartel J. Jonkman, United States Representative from Michigan
- Martin Kalbfleisch (1804–1873), United States Representative from New York
- Thomas Kean (born 1935), 48th Governor of New Jersey
- Herman Knickerbocker (1779–1855), United States Representative from New York
- John Lindsay (1920–2000), Mayor of New York City and United States Representative from New York
- Bob Livingston (born 1943), United States Representative from Louisiana
- Henry Demarest Lloyd (1847–1903), progressive political activist
- David Mathews (1739–1800), last Mayor of New York City of British North America during the American Revolution
- Peter Meijer (born 1988), United States Representative from Michigan
- Elizabeth Monroe (1768–1830), wife of James Monroe; of paternal English and maternal Dutch ancestry
- John Moorlach (born 1955), California State Senator, Chair of the Orange County, California Board of Supervisors, Orange County, California Treasurer-Tax Collector
- Dave Mulder (born 1939), State Senator from Iowa
- A. J. Muste (1885–1967), socialist militant active in the pacifist movement, labor movement and U.S. civil rights movement
- William Penn (1644–1718), founder of Philadelphia
- Dick Posthumus (born 1950), 61st Lieutenant Governor of Michigan
- John V. L. Pruyn (1811–1877), United States Representative from New York
- Eleanor Roosevelt (1884–1962), wife of Franklin D. Roosevelt
- Franklin D. Roosevelt (1882–1945), 32nd President of the United States
- Theodore Roosevelt (1858–1919), 26th President of the United States
- Marge Roukema (1929–2014), United States Representative from New Jersey
- Albert Janse Ryckman (c. 1642–1737), Mayor of Albany, New York; prominent Brewer; captain of the Albany Malitia
- Philip Schuyler (1733–1804), general in the American Revolutionary War; United States Senator from New York
- Alan K. Simpson (born 1931), United States Senator from Wyoming
- Kyrsten Sinema (born 1976), United States Congresswoman and US Senator from Arizona
- Peter Stuyvesant (1612–1672), Director-General of the colony of New Amsterdam (later New York)
- Fred Thompson (1942–2015), U.S. Senator and actor
- George Bell Timmerman Jr. (1912–1994), Governor of South Carolina
- Martin Van Buren (1782–1862), 8th President of the United States
- Jacobus Van Cortlandt (1658–1739), two-time Mayor of New York City
- Pierre Van Cortlandt (1721–1814), 1st Lieutenant Governor of New York
- Stephanus Van Cortlandt (1643–1700), first native-born Mayor of New York City, grandfather of Pierre van Cortlandt
- John Van de Kamp (1936–2017), Attorney General of California (1983–1991)
- Chris Van Hollen (born 1959), United States Senator from Maryland
- Espy Van Horne (1795–1829), United States Representative from Pennsylvania
- Isaac B. Van Houten (1776–1850), United States Representative from New York
- Cornelius P. Van Ness (1782–1852), 10th Governor of Vermont and Envoy Extraordinary and Minister Plenipotentiary to the Kingdom of Spain
- Frederick Van Nuys (1874–1944), United States Senator from Indiana
- Stephen Van Rensselaer (1764–1839), 2nd Lieutenant Governor of New York and one of the richest Americans ever to have lived
- Robert B. Van Valkenburgh (1762–1834), United States Representative from New York
- Murray Van Wagoner (1821–1888), United States Representative from New York
- Robert Anderson Van Wyck (1849–1918), first Mayor of New York City after the consolidation of the five boroughs into the City of New York in 1898
- Cornelius Van Wyck Lawrence (1791–1861), first popularly elected Mayor of New York City
- Tim Van Zandt (1762–1834), United States Representative from Missouri
- Arthur Vandenberg (1884–1951), United States Senator from Michigan
- Guy Vander Jagt (1931–2007), United States Representative from Michigan
- Richard Vander Veen (1922–2006), United States Representative from Michigan
- William Henry Vanderbilt III (1901–1981), Governor of Rhode Island
- Daniel C. Verplanck (1762–1834), United States Representative from New York
- Daniel W. Voorhees (1827–1897), United States Senator from Indiana
- Peter Dumont Vroom (1791–1873), Democratic Party politician
- Victor Vroom (born 1932), business school professor at the Yale School of Management
- Henry C. Warmoth (1842–1931), Governor of Louisiana
- Jacob Aaron Westervelt (1800–1879), shipbuilder and Mayor of New York City (1853–1855)

=== Sciences ===
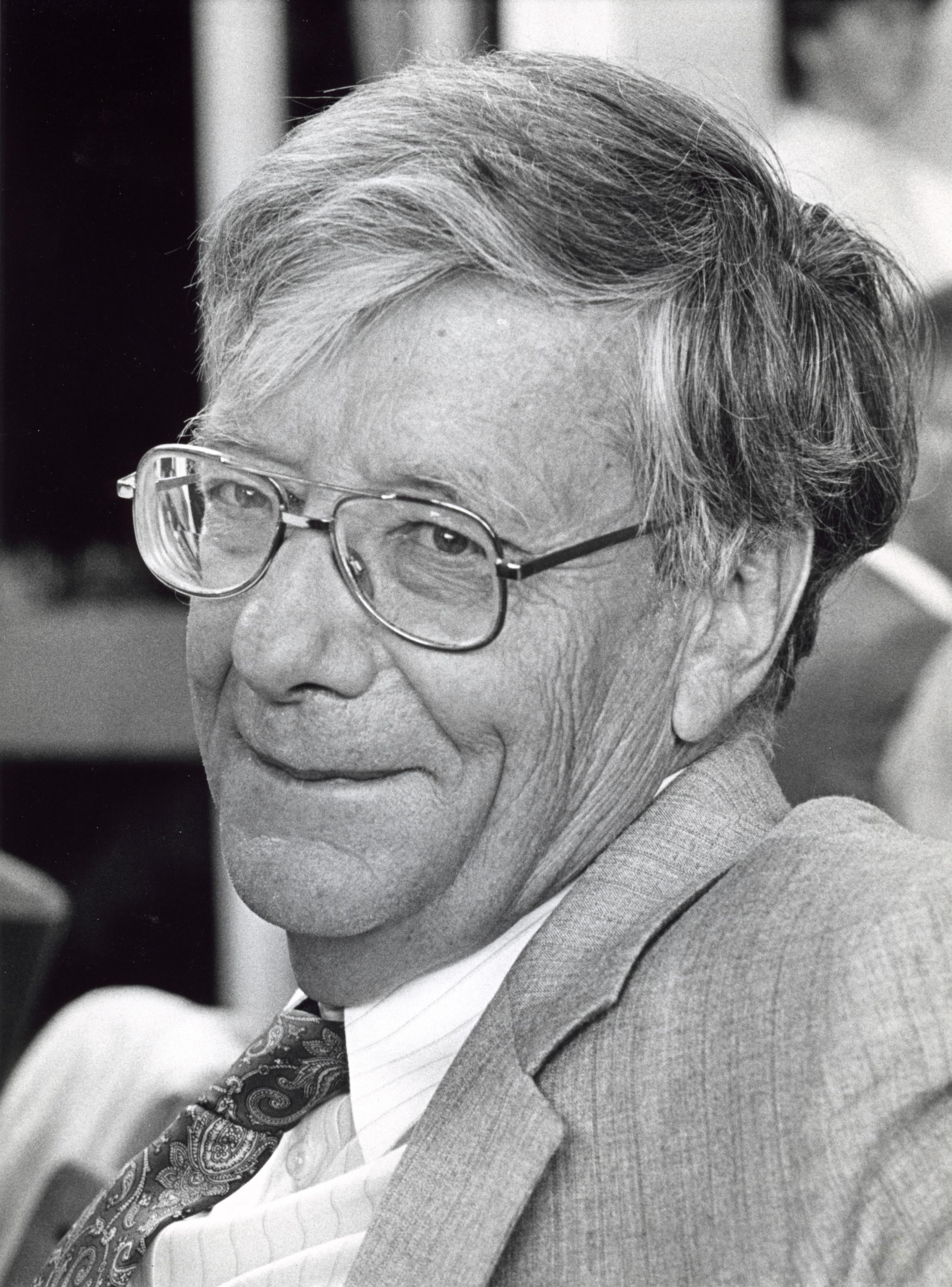
Nicolaas Bloembergen

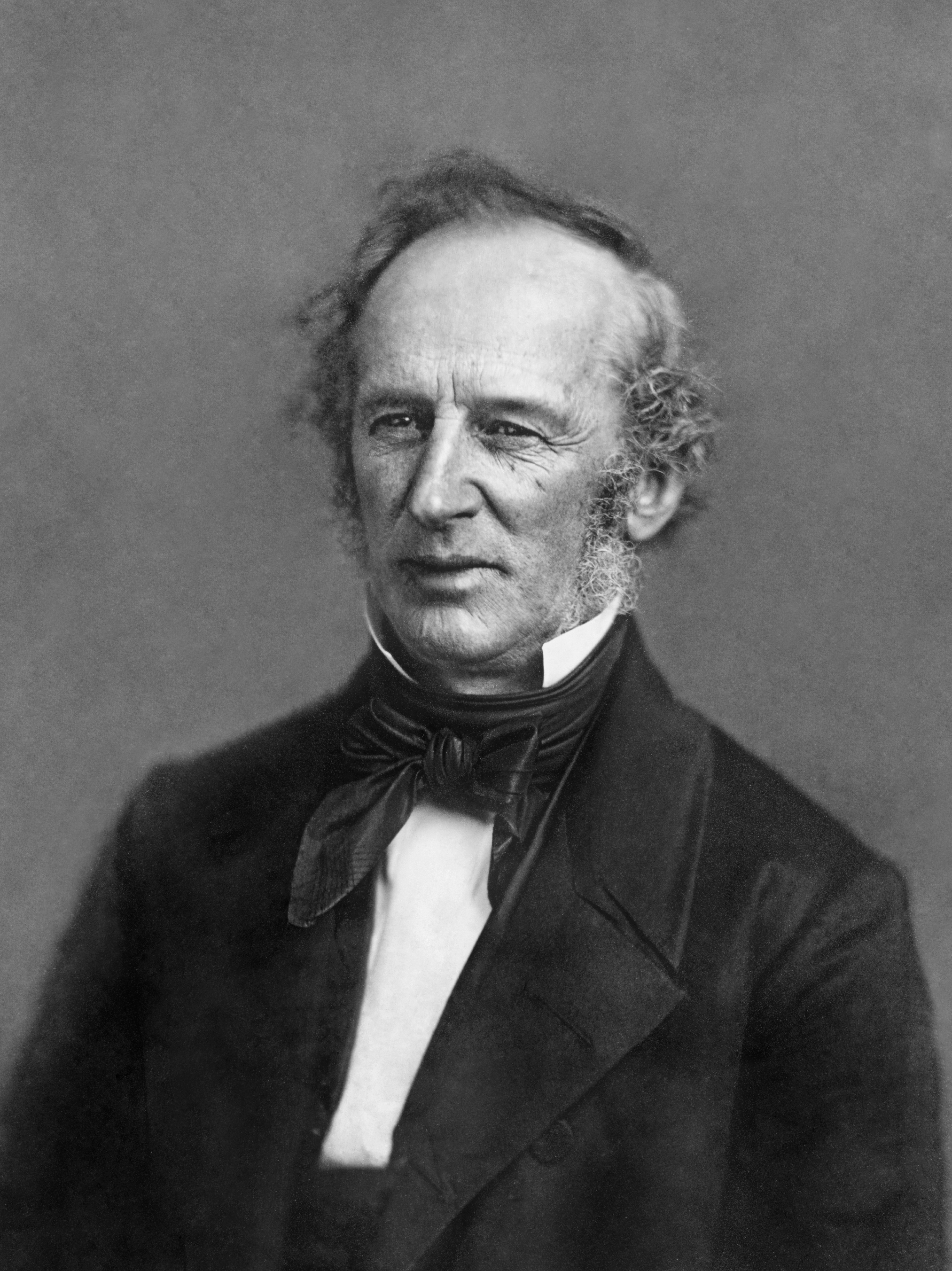
Cornelius Vanderbilt

- George David Birkhoff (1884–1944), mathematician
- Nicolaas Bloembergen (1906–1982), physicist
- Hendrik Wade Bode (1920–2017), engineer, inventor, and a pioneer of modern control theory
- Bart J. Bok (1906–1983), astronomer, director of Steward Observatory
- Dirk Brouwer (1902–1966), astronomer
- Theodore Gill (1837–1914), ichthyologist, mammalogist, malacologist, and librarian
- Samuel Abraham Goudsmit (1902–1978), physicist famous for jointly proposing the concept of electron spin with
- Richard Hamming (1915–1998), mathematician
- Anthony Heinsbergen (1894–1981), muralist considered the foremost designer of North American movie theatre interiors
- John Houbolt (1919–2014), aerospace engineer, Apollo 11 route planner
- Arend Lijphart (born 1936), political scientist
- Willem Johan Kolff (1911–2009), inventor of hemodialysis treatment
- Gerard Peter Kuiper (1905–1973), astronomer
- Willem Jacob Luyten (1899–1994), astronomer
- Robert Moog (1934–2005), a pioneer of electronic music and inventor of the Moog synthesizer
- Henry Augustus Rowland (1848–1901), physicist, served as the first president of the American Physical Society
- Jan Schilt (1894–1982), Dutch-born astronomer, inventor of the Schilt photometer, Rutherford Professor of Astronomy at Columbia University
- Maarten Schmidt (1929–2022), Dutch-born astronomer who measured the distances of astronomical objects called quasars
- Hubert Schoemaker (1950–2006), chemist and biotechnological pioneer
- Benjamin Spock (1903–1998), paediatrician and author of Baby and Child Care
- James Van Allen (1914–2006), astronomer for whom the Van Allen belt is named
- Robert J. Van de Graaff (1901–1967), physicist, developed the Van de Graaff generator
- Peter van de Kamp (1901–1995), astronomer
- Lodewijk van den Berg (born 1932), chemical engineer and astronaut, payload specialist STS-51B Space Shuttle Challenger
- Willard Van Orman Quine (1908–2000), logician and philosopher
- George Eugene Uhlenbeck (1900–1988), theoretical physicist known for his contributions to quantum mechanics and statistical mechanics
- John Hasbrouck Van Vleck (1899–1980), physicist
- Albert Vander Veer (1841–1929), surgeon
- Mary van Kleeck (1883–1972), social scientist, feminist, and economic researcher

=== Businessmen ===
- Cornelius Vanderbilt (1794–1877), founder of Vanderbilt University
- Thomas Edison (1847–1931), inventor and businessman; his father was of Dutch descent
- Anthony Fokker (1890–1939), aviation pioneer and aircraft manufacturer
- Wayne Huizenga (1937-2018), businessman, entrepreneur, and philanthropist
- Hank Meijer (born 1952), CEO US supermarket chain Meijer

=== Sports ===
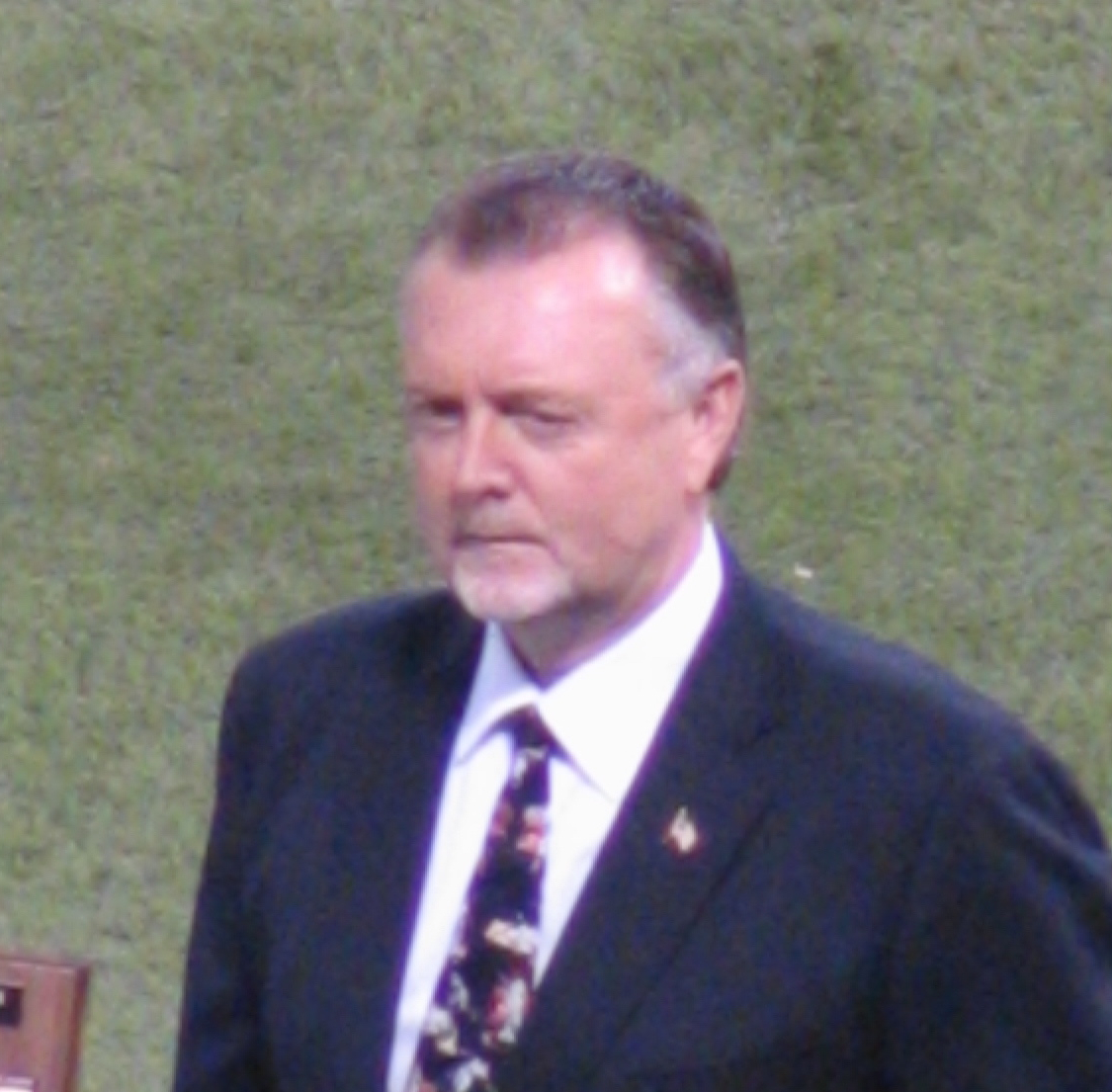
Bert Blyleven

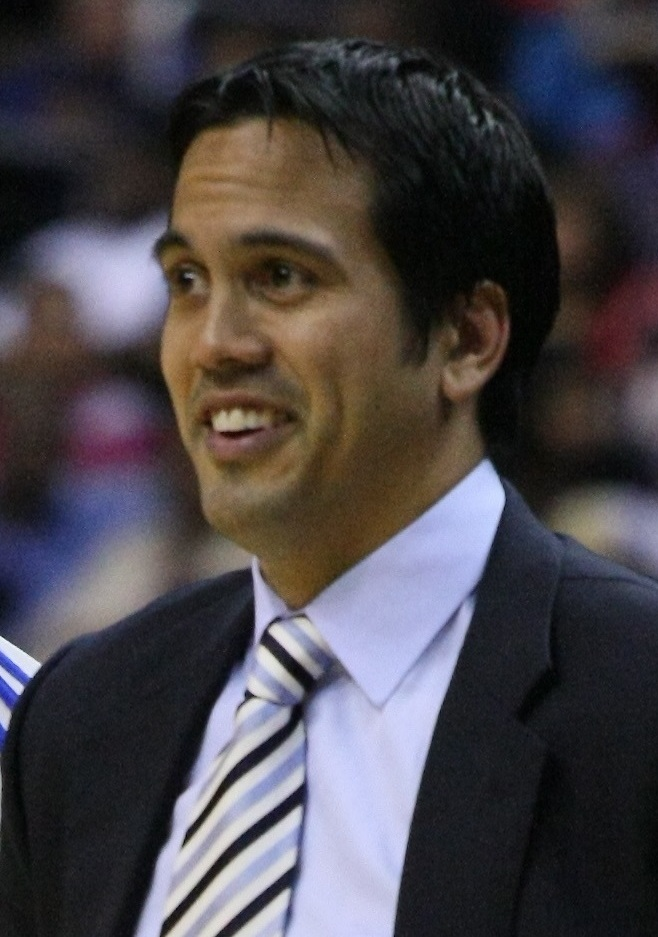
Erik Spoelstra

- David Aardsma (born 1981), Major League Baseball player currently with the Seattle Mariners
- Don Ackerman (1930–2011), NBA player
- Rick Adelman (born 1946), NBA player and head coach
- Lance Armstrong (born 1971), professional cyclist
- Earl W. Bascom (1906–1995), Hall of Fame rodeo champion and rodeo pioneer known as the "father of modern rodeo."
- Odell Beckham Jr. (born 1992), NFL player; mother is part Dutch
- Hank Beenders (1916–2003), NBA player
- Bert Blyleven (born 1951), Major League Baseball player, born in the Netherlands
- Carmella (born 1987), professional wrestler
- Matt den Dekker (born 1987), Major League Baseball center fielder
- Vern Den Herder (born 1948), NFL defensive end with Miami Dolphins 1971–82, two-time Super Bowl champ
- Sergiño Dest (born 2000), soccer player
- Lenny Dykstra (born 1963), award-winning professional baseball player
- Robert Eenhoorn (born 1968), Major League Baseball; played for New York Yankees, Anaheim Angels and New York Mets
- Rikkert Faneyte (born 1969), Major League Baseball player from 1993 to 1996 for the San Francisco Giants and Texas Rangers
- Matt Grevers (born 1985), Olympic swimmer
- Cole Hamels (born 1983), Major League Baseball pitcher currently with the Texas Rangers
- Harald Hasselbach (born 1967), NFL player
- Shea Hillenbrand (born 1975), Major League Baseball player
- Jim Kaat (born 1938), Major League Baseball pitcher, three-time All Star, 16-time Gold Glove winner, and television broadcaster
- Kyle Korver (born 1981), NBA basketball player
- Arie Luyendyk (born 1953), auto racing driver, twice winner of the Indianapolis 500
- Alex Morgan (born 1989), professional soccer player
- Mark Mulder (born 1977), Major League Baseball pitcher
- Swen Nater (born 1950), ABA and NBA player, the only player ever to lead both the NBA and ABA in rebounding
- Kirk Nieuwenhuis (born 1987), Major League Baseball player for the Milwaukee Brewers
- Diamond Dallas Page (born 1956), professional wrestler
- Mark Pawelek (born 1986), professional baseball player
- Jay Riemersma (born 1973), NFL player for the Buffalo Bills
- Bas Rutten (born 1965), MMA fighter and color commentator
- Ryan Sheckler (born 1989), skateboarder
- Jack Sikma (born 1955), Hall of Fame NBA player, averaged 15.6 points and 9.8 rebounds during 14 seasons; former assistant coach at Minnesota Timberwolves
- Luke Sikma (born 1989), basketball player
- Julia Smit (born 1987), Olympic swimmer
- Erik Spoelstra (born 1970), head coach for the Miami Heat, during their NBA championship win in 2012
- Earnie Stewart (born 1969), soccer player who was a regular midfielder for the US national team from 1990s until his retirement in 2005
- Greg Stiemsma (born 1985), NBA player
- Jermaine Van Buren (born 1980), Major League Baseball player
- Tejay van Garderen (born 1988), cyclist
- Jeff Van Gundy (born 1962), NBA color commentator, former NBA head coach for the New York Knicks and Houston Rockets
- Stan Van Gundy (born 1959), current NBA head coach for the Detroit Pistons
- Keith Van Horn (born 1975), NBA player
- James van Riemsdyk (born 1989), NHL player for the Philadelphia Flyers
- Trevor van Riemsdyk (born 1991), NHL player for the Washington Capitals
- Dale Van Sickel (1907–1977), football player, actor and stuntman
- Andy Van Slyke (born 1960), Major League Baseball player, first base coach for the Detroit Tigers
- Scott Van Slyke (born 1986), Major League Baseball player
- Tiffany van Soest (born 1989), Muay Thai kickboxer
- Kyle Vanden Bosch (born 1978), former NFL player
- Leighton Vander Esch (born 1996), linebacker for the Dallas Cowboys
- Johnny Vander Meer (1914–1997), baseball player, the only pitcher in major league history to pitch two consecutive no-hitters
- Logan Vander Velden (born 1971), NBA player
- Andrew Van Ginkel (born 1995), NFL player
- Kyle Van Noy (born 1991), NFL player
- John Vander Wal (born 1966), Major League Baseball player
- Peter Vanderkaay (born 1984), Olympic swimmer
- Fred VanVleet (born 1994), NBA player
- Justin Verlander (born 1983), Major League Baseball pitcher for the Detroit Tigers
- Derek West (born 1996), Major League baseball player
- Tiger Woods (born 1975), professional golfer
- Lily Yohannes (born 2007), soccer player

=== Theology ===
- Louis Berkhof (1873–1957), reformed systematic theologian at Calvin Theological Seminary
- Harold Camping (1921–2013), radio broadcaster and evangelist
- Hank Hanegraaff (born 1950), Christian apologist and president of the Christian Research Institute
- Anthony A. Hoekema (1913–1988), reformed systematic theologian at Calvin Theological Seminary
- Herman Hoeksema (1886–1965), pastor in the Christian Reformed Church and later in the Protestant Reformed Churches, Reformed systematic theologian at the Protestant Reformed Theological School
- Richard Mouw (born 1940), Christian philosopher and apologist and president of Fuller Theological Seminary
- James Olthuis, inter-disciplinary scholar in ethics, hermeneutics, philosophical theology, as well as a theorist and practitioner of psychotherapy at the Institute for Christian Studies
- Alvin Plantinga (born 1932), philosopher known for his work in epistemology, metaphysics, and the philosophy of religion
- Cornelius Plantinga, president of Calvin Theological Seminary
- Robert A. Schuller (born 1954), televangelist and pastor of the Crystal Cathedral in Garden Grove, California, son of Robert H. Schuller
- Robert H. Schuller (1926–2015), televangelist and pastor known around the world through his weekly broadcast The Hour of Power
- Lewis B. Smedes (1921–2002), Christian author, ethicist, and theologian at Fuller Theological Seminary
- Albertus van Raalte (1811–1876), Calvinist preacher and leader of Dutch immigrants to Michigan
- Cornelius Van Til (1895–1987), Christian philosopher, Reformed theologian, and presuppositional apologist
- Geerhardus Vos (1888–1946), professor of Biblical Theology at Calvin Theological Seminary and at Princeton Theological Seminary

=== Fictional characters ===
- Nate Archibald, character from Gossip Girl
- Pete Campbell, character from Mad Men
- Goldmember, Austin Powers in Goldmember (2002)
- Gregory House, the main character from House
- Daniel Jackson, character from Stargate
- Rory Jansen, character from The Words
- Fox Mulder, The X-Files
- Brittany Pierce, character from Glee
- Mildred Pierce, character from Mildred Pierce
- Moe Szyslak, The Simpsons
- Abigail Van Buren, pen name of Pauline Phillips, writer of Dear Abby advice column founded in 1956
- Buford van Stomm, character from Phineas and Ferb
- Sinjin Van Cleef, character from Victorious
- Rex Van de Kamp, husband of Bree Van de Kamp of Desperate Housewives
- William Van Den Broeck, character from Random Hearts
- Eric van der Woodsen, character from Gossip Girl
- Serena van der Woodsen, one of the main cast members of Gossip Girl
- Summer van Horne, character from Make It or Break It
- Traci van Horne, character from Hannah Montana
- Milhouse Van Houten, The Simpsons
- Nicholas Van Ryn, Dragonwyck
- Rip Van Winkle, main protagonist in Washington Irving's short story of the same name (1819)
- Mona Vanderwaal, character from Pretty Little Liars
- Dieter Von Cunth, evil character from MacGruber
- Jason Voorhees, character from the Friday the 13th series
- Bridget "Bee" Vreeland, character from The Sisterhood of the Traveling Pants

=== Others ===
- Gertrude Baniszewski, American murderer; father was of Dutch ancestry
- Jack Dangermond, founder of ESRI, a Geographic Information Systems (GIS) software company
- Sante Kimes, American murderer; mother was of Dutch ancestry
- Linda Kolkena, murder victim
- Alfred Peet (1920–2007), founder of Peet's Coffee and Tea, credited with starting the gourmet coffee revolution in the United States
- Jan Pol (born 1942), Dutch-American veterinarian featured on the Incredible Dr. Pol television series, emigrated to the United States from the Netherlands
- Leslie van Houten, former Manson family serving life sentence for murder

== See also ==
- Dutch Americans
