= List of Finnish Americans =

The following is a list of Finnish Americans, including both original immigrants who obtained American citizenship and their American descendants.

To be included in this list, the person must have a Wikipedia article showing they are Finnish American or must have references showing they are Finnish American and are notable.

== List ==
=== Academics, inventors, scientists ===
- Lars Ahlfors (1907–1996), mathematician, one of the first two people to be awarded the Fields Medal; Wolf Prize winner; William Caspar Graustein Professor of Mathematics at Harvard University
- Alfred Aho (born 1941), computer scientist best known for his work on programming languages, compilers, and related algorithms, and his textbooks on the art and science of computer programming, as of 2011 he holds the Lawrence Gussman Chair of Computer Science at Columbia University. He served as chair of the department from 1995 to 1997, and again in the spring of 2003
- Jaakko Hintikka (1929–2015), professor of philosophy at Boston University; regarded as the founder of formal epistemic logic and of game semantics for logic
- Bengt Robert Holmström (born 1949), economist, Nobel Laureate with Oliver Hart "for their contribution to contract theory", professor of economics; currently Paul A. Samuelson Professor of Economics at the Massachusetts Institute of Technology
- Ruth Kaarlela (1919–2018), professor of blindness and vision studies, Western Michigan University; expert on rehabilitation, gerontology
- Benjamin B. Rubinstein (1905–1989), physician and psychoanalyst; had a practice in New York; wrote extensively on philosophy of psychoanalysis
- Linus Torvalds (born 1969), software engineer best known for having initiated the development of the Linux kernel; became a U.S. citizen in September 2010
- Vaino Jack Vehko (1918–1999), automotive engineer; NASA rocket scientist; in 1960 became Director of Engineering on the Saturn S1 and S1B booster rocket program at Chrysler Space Division's Michoud operation in New Orleans, Louisiana; the Saturn boosters successfully launched all the NASA Apollo and Moon missions
- Carl A. Wirtanen (1910–1990), astronomer

=== Arts and literature ===
- Jean M. Auel (born 1936), author, wrote the Earth's Children books; her books have sold 34 million copies worldwide in many translations
- Jack Myllymaki (1950-2008) piano player, "Piano" Jack Myllymaki
- Rudy Autio (1926–2007), sculptor
- Max Dimont (1912–1992), historian; author of Jews, God and History, which received critical acclaim and has sold over a million and a half copies; has lectured on Jewish history throughout the United States, Canada, South Africa, Brazil, and Finland; author of The Indestructible Jews, The Jews in America, and Appointment in Jerusalem
- Eino Friberg (1901–1995), Protestant Minister and English translator of The Kalevala, the Finnish national epic
- Rick Hautala (1949–2013), writer
- Clifton Karhu (1927-2007), artist in Japan renowned for woodblock prints of Kyoto and Kanazawa
- Tiina Nunnally, author and translator
- Emil Petaja, author
- Hannu Rajaniemi, science fiction author
- Eero Saarinen (1910–1961), architect and product designer of the 20th century, famous for his simple, sweeping, arching structural curves
- Eliel Saarinen (1873–1950), architect who became famous for his art nouveau buildings in the early 20th century
- Haddon Sundblom, artist
- Wallace Wood, comics artist (EC Comics, Mad Magazine, Marvel Comics)

=== Business ===
- Bill Aho (born 1957), businessman who is a partner with The SagePoint Group, a management consulting firm, served as Senior Vice President of Strategic Planning for Darden Restaurants and was instrumental in turning around the Red Lobster business.
- Mary Barra, CEO of General Motors
- Mike Markkula (born 1942), entrepreneur; angel investor and second CEO of Apple Computer, Inc.; provided early critical funding and managerial support; known as Apple employee #3
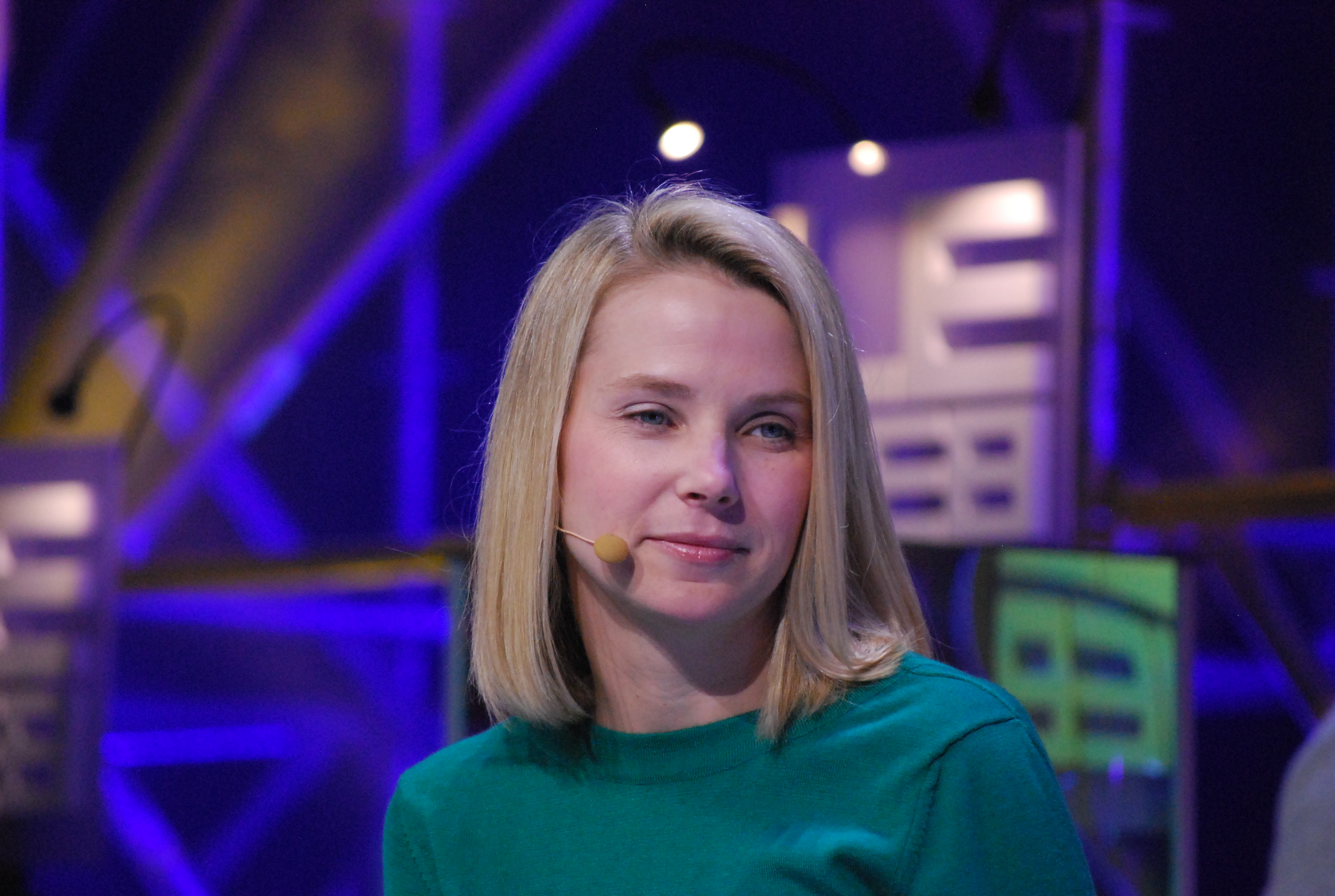
- Marissa Mayer
  Marissa Mayer, CEO of Yahoo and former Google executive
- Gustave Niebaum (1842–1908), established Inglenook Winery in Napa Valley, California, the first Bordeaux style winery in the US
- Oscar Wirkkala (1880–1959), logger and inventor, developed the high lead method of logging, which revolutionized the industry; also invented important pieces of that industry's machinery used during the first half of the 20th century

=== Film and television ===
- Pamela Anderson, actress, father is of part Finnish ancestry
- Richard Dean Anderson, paternal grandfather came from Finland
- Maude Apatow (born 1997), actress
- Lucas Bryant, actor
- Sofia Bryant, actress
- Austin Butler, actor, Finnish on maternal side
- David Chokachi (born 1968), actor, mother is of Finnish descent

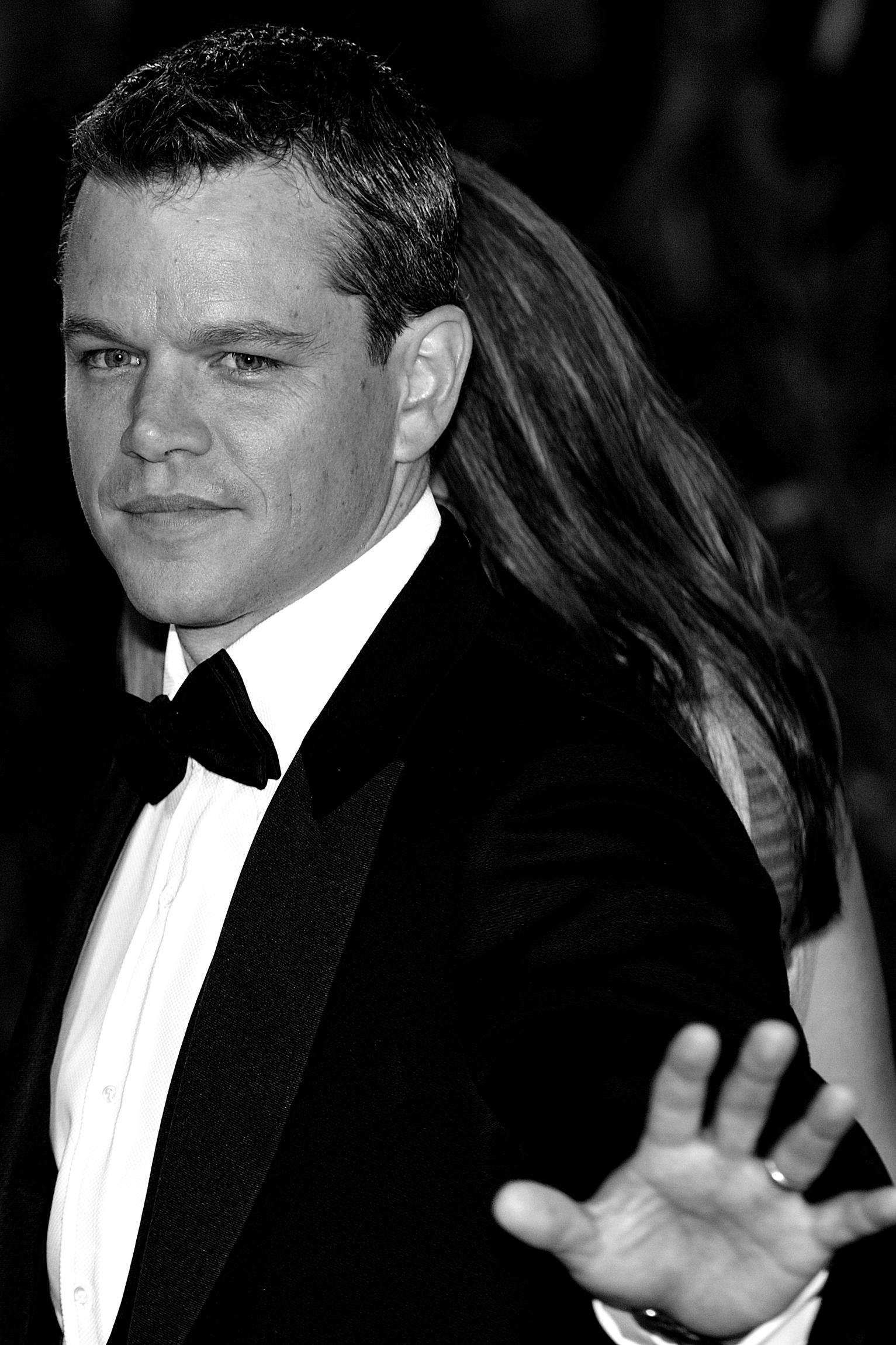
Matt Damon

- Matt Damon (born 1970), award-winning screenwriter and actor, mother is of partial Finnish descent
- Eric Dane (1972–2026), actor
- Alexa Davalos (born 1982), actress, mother is of partial Finnish descent
- Elyssa Davalos (born 1959), actress, father was of partial Finnish descent
- Richard Davalos (1930–2016), actor; starred in East of Eden (1955) as James Dean's brother; portrayed the convict Blind Dick in Cool Hand Luke (1967); won the Theatre World Award for his performance in the Arthur Miller play A Memory of Two Mondays in 1955; father is of Finnish descent
- Anna Easteden (born 1976), actress; The House of Branching Love (2009) and Sideways (2009); co-starred in soap operas Passions and Days Of Our Lives, and the series Bones
- Taina Elg (1931–2025), Golden Globe-winning film and stage actress
- Nathan Fillion (born 1970), actor
- George Gaynes (1917–2016), film actor, known for his role as Commandant Eric Lassard in the Police Academy film series
- Renny Harlin (born 1959), producer and director; immigrant from Finland
- Crystal Hayes (born 1984), model and actress
- Brian Heidik (born 1968), won $1,000,000 on the Thailand edition of Survivor
- Nancy Juvonen (born 1967), American-Finnish film producer; with Drew Barrymore, co-owner of production company Flower Films; produced Never been Kissed (1999), Charlie's Angels (2000), Donnie Darko (2002), Charlie's Angels – Full Throttle (2003); wife of comedian and talk show host Jimmy Fallon
- Paul Kangas, host of Nightly Business Report television program
- Vincent Kartheiser (born 1979), actor, known for his role in Mad Men, has distant Finnish ancestry
- Marta Kristen (born 1945), perhaps best known for her role as the character "Judy Robinson" in the cult television series Lost in Space
- Christine Lahti (born 1950), film actress, paternal grandparents were immigrants from Finland
- Jessica Lange (born 1949), two-time Academy Award-winning film actress, maternal grandparents were of Finnish descent
- Dick Latvala (1943–1999), tape archivist for the Grateful Dead
- Scott Lautanen, television director and producer
- David Lynch (born 1946), director, mother is of part Finnish ancestry
- Leslie Mann (born 1972), actress who has appeared in numerous films, including The Cable Guy (1996), George of the Jungle (1997), Big Daddy (1999), The 40-Year-Old Virgin (2005), Knocked Up (2007), 17 Again (2009), Funny People (2009), This Is 40 (2012), and Blockers (2018)
- Lisa Niemi (born 1956), actress, director and choreographer
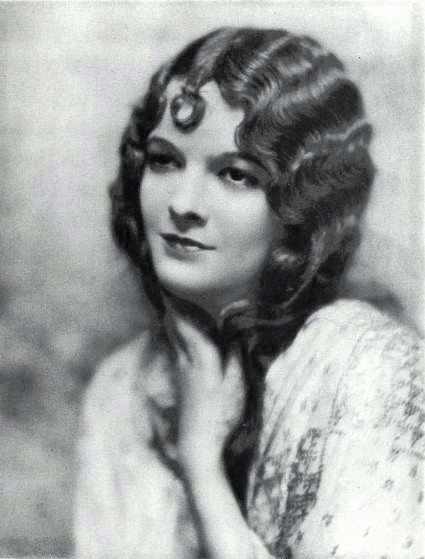
  Marian Nixon
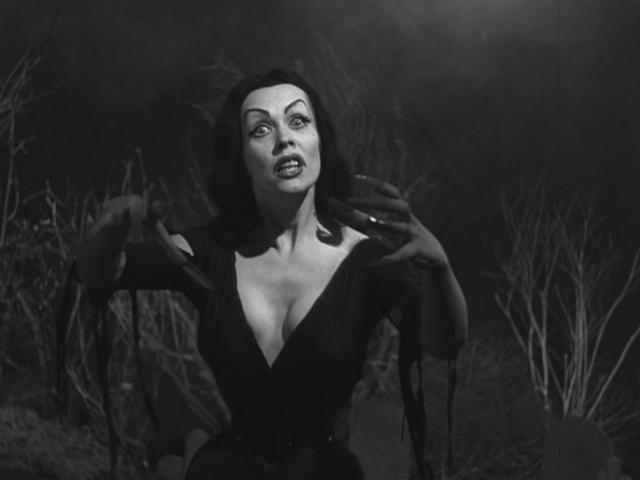
  Maila Nurmi
- Marian Nixon (1904–1983), actress
- Maila Nurmi (1921–2008), creator of the well-remembered 1950s character of Vampira
- Catherine Oxenberg (born 1961), actress
- Ethan Peck (born 1986), actor
- Bonnie Pietila, casting director and producer for The Simpsons
- Joyce Randolph (born Joyce Sirola, 1924–2024), actress, best known for playing Trixie Norton on The Honeymooners
- Allison Rosati (born 1963), journalist, paternal Finnish ancestry
- Eric Saarinen (1942–2024), cinematographer, son of Eero Saarinen
- Albert Salmi (1928–1990), film and television actor
- Steve Schubert (born 1951), football player, paternal grandmother was a Finnish immigrant
- Sonya Smith (born 1972), telenovela fame actress
- Georgia Tennant (born 1984), actress, daughter of British actor Peter Davison and American actress Sandra Dickinson
- Vanessa Williams (born 1963), singer, actress, producer, former fashion model; first African American to be crowned Miss America; a DNA test revealed she is 12% Finnish
- Marsha Garces Williams, film producer and mom of Zelda Williams
- Zelda Williams (born 1989), actress, daughter of Robin Williams; mother of partial Finnish descent
- Renée Zellweger (born 1969), actress and producer; mother of partial Finnish descent
- Daphne Zuniga, actress, mother of partial Finnish descent

=== Military personnel ===
- Johannes Anderson (1887–1950), Finnish-born U.S. Army soldier during World War I; Medal of Honor recipient
- Reino Hayhanen (1920–1961), U.S. spy; Soviet Lt. Colonel who defected to the U.S. during the Cold War; helped break open the Hollow Nickel Case which led to the capture of top Soviet spies in the U.S. looking for atomic secrets
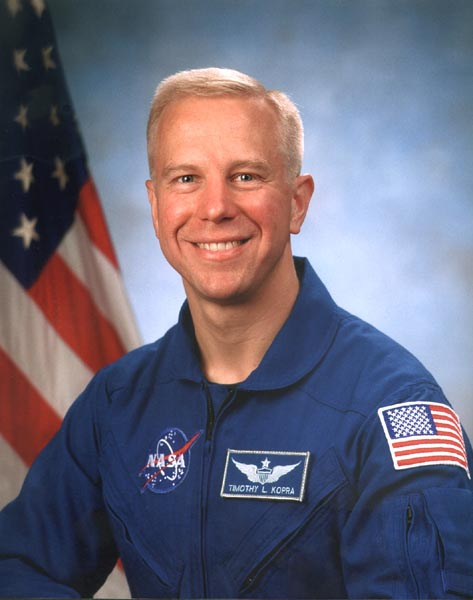
  Timothy L. Kopra
- Timothy L. Kopra (born 1963), astronaut; flew missions on the International Space Station and Space Shuttle Discovery; U.S. Army Colonel; Desert Storm veteran; Bronze Star recipient; West Point graduate
- Lauri Törni (1919–1965), Finnish Army Captain who led an infantry company in Finnish Winter and Continuation Wars; moved to the United States after World War II and adopted the name Larry Thorne; served with the U.S. Army Special Forces in Vietnam War; killed in Laos while on a clandestine mission
- Dale Eugene Wayrynen (1947–1967), U.S. Army enlisted soldier; recipient of the Medal of Honor, America's highest military decoration, for his actions in the Vietnam War
- Carl E. Vuono (born 1934), retired United States Army general who served as the Chief of Staff of the United States Army from 1987 to 1991.
- Olavi Alakulppi (1915-1990), Finnish Army Captain and recipient of the Mannerheim cross, who later moved to the US enlisting in the US army and retiring at the rank of Lieutenant Colonel.

=== Musicians ===
- Sylvester Ahola, jazz musician
- Muriel Anderson (born 1960), guitarist and harp-guitarist
- Carla Harvey (born 1976), singer
- Jillian Hervey (born 1989), singer and dancer
- Mark Hoppus (born 1972), bass player in Blink-182
- Jorma Kaukonen (born 1940), blues, folk and rock guitarist
- Peter Kaukonen (born 1945), blues, folk and rock guitarist; younger brother of Jorma Kaukonen
- David Mustaine (born 1961), musician best known as the co-founder, vocalist, lead guitarist, and primary songwriter of American heavy metal band Megadeth
- Jaco Pastorius (1951–1987), influential jazz bassist
- Wilho Saari, Kantele musician
- Hiski Salomaa (1891–1957), folk singer and songwriter
- Esa-Pekka Salonen (born 1958), orchestral conductor and composer; Principal Conductor and artistic director of the Los Angeles Philharmonic
- T-Bone Slim (1890?–1942?), humourist, poet, songwriter, hobo, and a labour activist in the Industrial Workers of the World
- Einar Aaron Swan, jazz musician
- Viola Turpeinen (1909-1958), polka accordion player
- David Uosikkinen (born 1956), rock drummer
- Osmo Vänskä (born 1953), orchestral conductor, clarinetist and composer; music director of the Minnesota Orchestra
- Bobby Vee (1943–2016), rock singer, 1960s teen idol, Finnish on his mother's side (Tapanila)
- Charles Wuorinen (1938–2020), Pulitzer Prize-winning composer

=== Dance ===
- Shura Baryshnikov (born 1981), dancer and choreographer
- Carolyn Carlson (born 1943), choreographer and performer

=== Politics ===
- Gregory Nevala Calvert (1937–2005), National Secretary of Students for a Democratic Society, 1966–67
- Gus Hall (1910–2000), labor organizer, a founder of the United Steelworkers of America trade union; a leader of the Communist Party USA; five-time U.S. presidential candidate
- Cheri Honkala (born 1963), the Green Party's nominee for vice-president in the 2012 U.S. presidential election
- Emil Hurja (1892–1953), pioneer of political opinion polling; a top advisor to President Franklin D. Roosevelt; appeared on the cover of Time magazine in March 1936
- Oscar Larson (1871–1957), U.S. Representative from Minnesota, Republican, lawyer
- Marko Liias (born 1981), Washington State Democratic Senator representing the 21st legislative district. Former member of the Washington House of Representatives, 2020 candidate for Lieutenant Governor
- John Koskinen (1939-), businessman and public official.
- Robert W. Mattson, Jr. (1948–2012), Minnesota State Auditor, 1975–1979; Minnesota State Treasurer, 1983–1987
- Robert W. Mattson, Sr. (1924–1982), Minnesota State Attorney General, 1964–1967
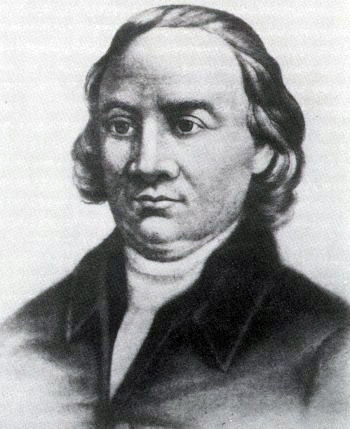
  John Morton
- John Morton (1724–1777), signer of the Declaration of Independence; delegate who cast the deciding vote in favor of Pennsylvania's support for United States Declaration of Independence
- William A. Niskanen, chairman of the Cato Institute
- William Alex Stolt (1900–2001), mayor of Anchorage, Alaska, 1941–1944
- Oskari Tokoi (1873–1963), Finnish politician
- John Raymond Ylitalo (1916–1987), U.S. Ambassador to Paraguay; career U.S. Foreign Service Officer

=== Sports ===
- Lars Anderson, wrestler
- Michael Anti, sport shooter
- Lizzie Armanto, skateboarder
- Randy Carlyle, ice hockey player, coach
- Dick Enberg (1935–2017), former sportscaster for the San Diego Padres, CBS, and ESPN
- Link Gaetz, ice hockey player
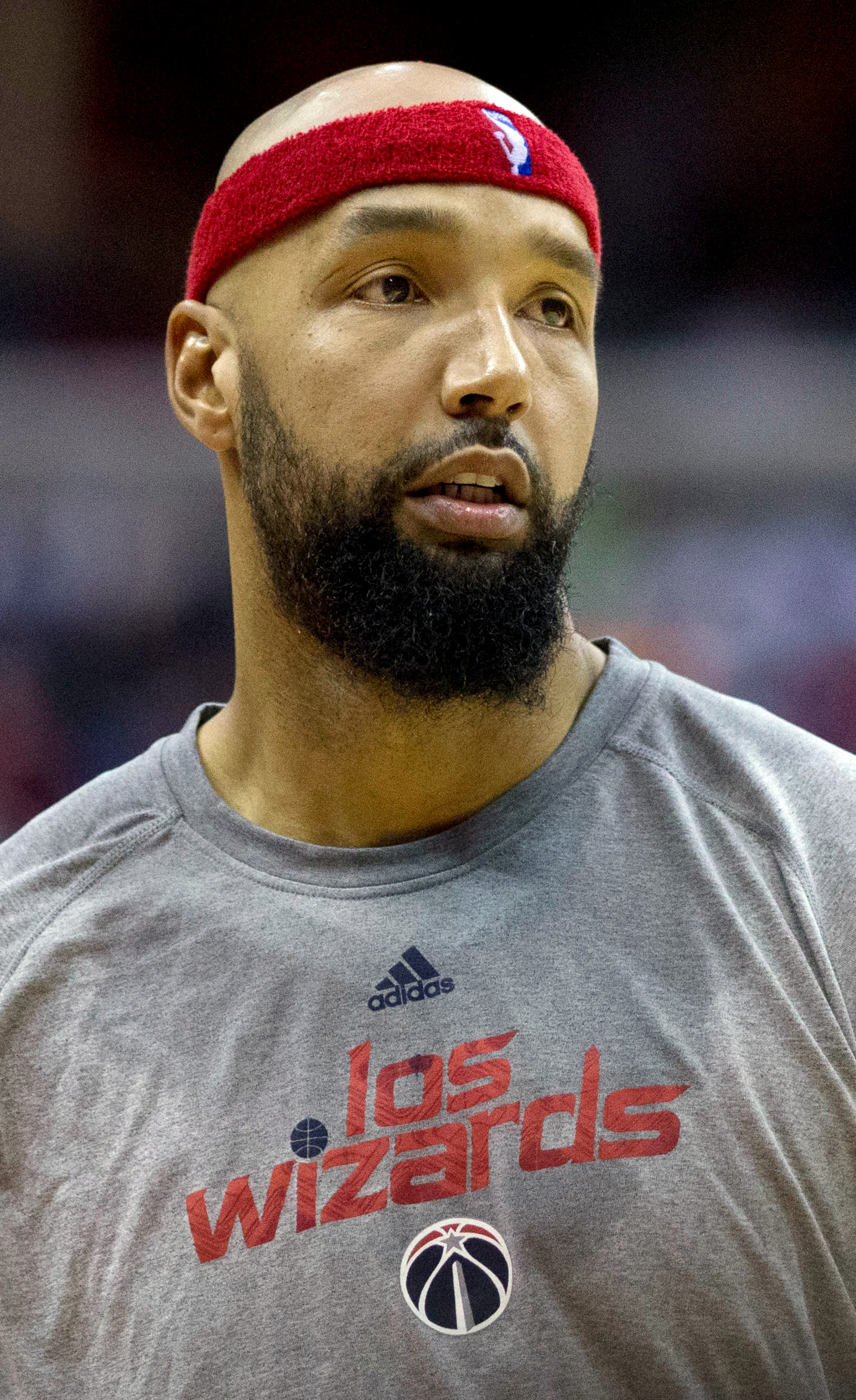
- Drew Gooden
  Drew Gooden, NBA player; Finnish mother
- Dwight Helminen, ice hockey player
- Lars Helminen, ice hockey player
- Shawn Huff, basketball player for the Finnish national team; Finnish mother
- Tristan Jeskanen, luger
- Kai Kantola, ice hockey player
- Teemu Kivihalme, ice hockey player
- William Kolehmainen (1887–1967), long-distance runner
- Jeff Lahti, Major League Baseball pitcher
- Gerald Lee, basketball player for the Finnish national team; Finnish mother
- Kristi Leskinen, freestyle skier
- Chico Maki, ice hockey player
- Wayne Maki, ice hockey player
- John Michaelson, only Major League Baseball player born in Finland
- Alex Murphy, NCAA basketball player and brother of Erik Murphy; Finnish mother
- Erik Murphy, basketball player for the Finnish national team; Finnish mother
- Matt Niskanen, ice hockey player
- Dan O'Brien (born 1966), former American decathlete, deemed one of the best decathlon athletes of the 1990s, winning an Olympic gold medal in Atlanta in 1996 after winning three consecutive world titles
- Will Ohman, Major League Baseball pitcher
- Blake Pietila, ice hockey player
- Luke Putkonen, Major League Baseball pitcher
- Pete Rasmus (1906–1975), discus thrower
- Rudy Rintala (1909–1999), four-sport collegiate athlete and hall-of-famer at Stanford University
- Brian Salonen, football player
- Kevin Tapani, Major League Baseball pitcher who played for the New York Mets, Minnesota Twins, Los Angeles Dodgers, Chicago White Sox, and Chicago Cubs, 1989–2001
- Nick Theslof, soccer player and coach; first American player to play in Europe
- Tyler Varga, retired NFL running back for Indianapolis Colts; Finnish mother
- Jacob Grandison, basketball player for the Boulazac Basket Dordogne

=== Other ===
- Carrie Keranen, voice actress, production manager, producer and voice director
- Armi Kuusela, winner of the first Miss Universe beauty contest
- Miriam Patchen, peace activist
- Aileen Wuornos, serial killer, mother is of Finnish descent

== See also ==
- List of Finns
- Finnish Americans
