= List of flag bearers for Chad at the Olympics =

Chad at the Olympics
- IOC code: CHA
- NOC: Comité Olympique et Sportif Tchadien
- Medals: Gold 0 Silver 0 Bronze 0 Total 0

Summer appearances
- 1964; 1968; 1972; 1976–1980; 1984; 1988; 1992; 1996; 2000; 2004; 2008; 2012; 2016; 2020; 2024

This is a list of flag bearers who have represented Chad at the Olympics.

Flag bearers carry the national flag of their country at the opening ceremony of the Olympic Games.

#	Event year	Season	Flag bearer	Sport
1	1964	Summer		
2	1968	Summer		
3	1972	Summer	Ahmed Senoussi	Athletics
4	1984	Summer	Ousman Miangoto	Athletics
5	1988	Summer	Paul Ngadjadoum	Athletics
6	1992	Summer		
7	1996	Summer	Kaltouma Nadjina	Athletics
8	2000	Summer	Gana Abba Kimet	Athletics
9	2004	Summer	Kaltouma Nadjina	Athletics
10	2008	Summer	Hinikissia Albertine Ndikert	Athletics
11	2012	Summer	Carine Ngarlemdana	Judo
12	2016	Summer	Bibiro Ali Taher	Athletics
13	2020	Summer	Bachir Mahamat	Athletics
13	2020	Summer	Demos Memneloum	Judo
14	2024	Summer	Israel Madaye	Archery
14	2024	Summer	Demos Memneloum	Judo

== See also ==
- Chad at the Olympics
