= Chad at the 2019 African Games =

- Flag of Chad
- IOC code: CHA
- NOC: Chadian Olympic and Sports Committee

in Rabat, Morocco 19 August 2019 – 31 August 2019
- Competitors: 59 (33 men and 26 women) in 8 sports
- Medals Ranked 36th: Gold 0 Silver 0 Bronze 4 Total 4

African Games appearances (overview)
- 1965; 1973; 1978; 1987; 1991–2007; 2011; 2015; 2019; 2023

Chad competed at the 2019 African Games held from 19 to 31 August 2019 in Rabat, Morocco. In total, four bronze medals were won and the country finished 36th in the medal table.

== Medal summary ==
=== Medal table ===
Medal	Name	Sport	Event	Date
Bronze	Demos Memneloum	Judo	Women's -70 kg	18 August
Bronze	Casimir Betel	Taekwondo	Men's -58 kg	22 August
Bronze	Aron Atchoumgai; Martine Hallas Maria; Marlyse Hourtou	Archery	Women's team	30 August
Bronze	Marlyse Hourtou; Israel Madaye	Archery	Mixed team	30 August

Medals by sport
Sport	1st place, gold medalist(s)	2nd place, silver medalist(s)	3rd place, bronze medalist(s)	Total
Archery	0	0	2	2
Judo	0	0	1	1
Taekwondo	0	0	1	1
Total	0	0	4	4

== Archery ==
Marlyse Hourtou competed at the 2019 African Games. In total, six athletes represented Chad in archery: Alexandre Danzabe, Madaye Israel Jacques Romno, Marlyse Hourtou, Aron Salome Atchoumgai and Martine Abaifouta Hallas Maria.

They won the bronze medal in the mixed team event and also in the women's team event.

== Athletics ==
Athletes representing Chad competed in several athletics events.

Mabrouk Matar competed in the men's 100 metres event. He finished in 46th place in the heats. He also competed in the men's 200 metres event and finished in 39th place in the heats.

Abbangah Brahim Zenaba competed in the women's 100 metres and women's 200 metres events and she finished in the 41st and 40th place in the heats respectively.

Bachir Ahmat Mahamat finished in 38th place in the heats in the men's 400 metres event.

Ali Hisseine Mahamat was scheduled to compete in the men's 1500 metres event but he did not start.

Valentin Betoudji finished in 17th place in the men's half marathon with a time of 1:10:44.

Koutou Madjou finished in 14th place in the women's half marathon.

== Boxing ==
Four athletes competed in boxing: Stephane Djedouboum (men's 69kg), Noel Lucas Justin (men's 81kg), Bambo Rodrigue (men's 75kg) and Anmon Olivier Yankim (men's 63kg).

== Judo ==
Gedeon Daniella, Sani Ibrahim Issa, Demos Memneloum, Chancella Mianbigue, Hissein Ramadane Omar Haroun Ramadan Ramadan and Hissein Ramadan Youssouf represented Chad in judo.

Memneloum won the bronze medal in the women's −70 kg event.

== Karate ==
Ten athletes representing Chad competed in karate. No medals were won. The competitors were Kesse Toudja, Serferbe Yvette Sob Hinka, Gag Grace, Houmaizou Maina Merci, Armel Djimbaye, Francis Ndamian, Mahmoud Al Hadj Issa, Gamo Cyrille, Echa Souleymane Ayi, and Victorine Koro.

== Table tennis ==
Chad competed in table tennis.

Idriss Allatchi Brahim, Adeline Djimet Koubia and Vanessa Ndoredje competed in table tennis.

== Taekwondo ==
Chad competed in Taekwondo. Casimir Betel won the bronze medal in the men's –58 kg event.

== Wrestling ==
Six athletes represented Chad in wrestling.

Key:

- VT – Victory by fall.
- PP – Decision by points – the loser with technical points.
- PO – Decision by points – the loser without technical points.
- ST – Great superiority – the loser without technical points and a margin of victory of at least 8 (Greco-Roman) or 10 (freestyle) points.
- SP – Technical superiority – the loser with technical points and a margin of victory of at least 8 (Greco-Roman) or 10 (freestyle) points.
- IN - Victory by injury - the loser is injured before or during a bout.

Men's freestyle

Athlete	Event	Qualification	Quarterfinal	Semifinal	Repechage 1	Final / BM	
Athlete	Event	Opposition Result	Opposition Result	Opposition Result	Opposition Result	Opposition Result	Rank
Elie Djekoundakom	−65 kg	Bye	M Swaray (SLE); W 6–0 ^{VT}	A Daniel (NGR); L 0–10 ^{ST}	Bye	A Hussen (EGY); L 0–10 ^{ST}	5
Modeste Minsoumouna	−74 kg	D Zon (BUR); L 1–8 ^{VT}	did not advance				13
Saleh Bouba	−86 kg	Bye	F Benferdjallah (ALG); L 0–5 ^{VT}	Did not advance	Bye	C Abossolo (CMR); L 0–4 ^{PO}	5
Athlete	Event	Group Stages		Semifinal	Bronze medal bout	Final	
Athlete	Event	Opposition Result	Standing	Opposition Result	Opposition Result	Opposition Result	Rank
Djakna Malick	−125 kg	Group B S Boltic (NGR): L 0–10 ^{ST} K Abdalla (EGY): L 0–9 ^{IN}	3	did not advance			6

Men's Greco-Roman

Athlete	Event	Qualification	Quarterfinal	Semifinal	Repechage 1	Final / BM	
Athlete	Event	Opposition Result	Opposition Result	Opposition Result	Opposition Result	Opposition Result	Rank
Saleh Bouba	−87 kg	R Moueniss (MAR); L 0–7 ^{VT}	did not advance				9
Athlete	Event	Group Stages		Semifinal	Bronze medal bout	Final	
Athlete	Event	Opposition Result	Standing	Opposition Result	Opposition Result	Opposition Result	Rank
Elie Djekoundakom	−67 kg	Group A A Merabet (ALG): L 0–9 ^{ST} A Boualem (MAR): W 0–0 ^{IN} M Elsayed (EGY): L 0–8 ^{ST}	3	did not advance			5
Djakna Malick	−130 kg	Group A H Haloui (ALG): L 0–9 ^{ST} A Lamkabber (MAR): L 0–9 ^{ST} A Mohamed (EGY): L 0–9 ^{VT}	4	did not advance			7

Women's freestyle

Athlete	Event	Qualification	Quarterfinal	Semifinal	Repechage 1	Final / BM	
Athlete	Event	Opposition Result	Opposition Result	Opposition Result	Opposition Result	Opposition Result	Rank
Josta Lubahitar	−50 kg	Bye	H Ahmed (EGY); L 0–2 ^{VT}	did not advance			7
Issa Zara	−57 kg	Bye	N Mbouma Nandzo (CGO); L 0–10 ^{ST}	did not advance			9
