= Chad at the 2020 Summer Olympics =

- Flag of Chad
- IOC code: CHA
- NOC: Chadian Olympic and Sports Committee

in Tokyo, Japan July 23, 2021 – August 8, 2021
- Competitors: 3 in 3 sports
- Flag bearers (opening): Demos Memneloum; Bachir Mahamat
- Flag bearer (closing): N/A
- Medals: Gold 0 Silver 0 Bronze 0 Total 0

Summer Olympics appearances (overview)
- 1964; 1968; 1972; 1976–1980; 1984; 1988; 1992; 1996; 2000; 2004; 2008; 2012; 2016; 2020; 2024

Chad competed at the 2020 Summer Olympics in Tokyo. Originally scheduled to take place from 24 July to 9 August 2020, the Games have been postponed to 23 July to 8 August 2021, because of the COVID-19 pandemic. It was the nation's thirteenth appearance at the Summer Olympics after its debut at the 1964 Summer Olympics.

Chad was represented by three athletes who competed across three sports. Demos Memneloum and Bachir Mahamat served as the country's flag-bearers during the opening ceremony and a volunteer carried the flag during the closing ceremony. The nation did not win any medals in the Games.

== Background ==
The Chadian Olympic and Sports Committee was formed in 1963 and was approved by the International Olympic Committee (IOC) in 1964. The 1964 Summer Olympics marked Chad's first participation as an independent nation in the Olympic Games. After the nation made its debut in the Summer Olympics at the 1964 Games, it has missed only two events and competed in every Summer Olympics since 1984. This edition of the Games in 2020 marked the nation's thirteenth appearance at the Summer Games.

The 2020 Summer Olympics in Tokyo was originally scheduled to take place from 24 July to 9 August 2020. The Games were later postponed to 23 July to 8 August 2021 due to the COVID-19 pandemic. Chad was represented by three athletes who competed across three sports. Demos Memneloum and Bachir Mahamat served as the country's flag-bearers during the opening ceremony and a volunteer carried the flag during the closing ceremony. The nation did not win any medals in the Games.

== Competitors ==
Chad was represented by three athletes who competed across three sports.

Sport	Men	Women	Total
Archery	0	1	1
Athletics	1	0	1
Judo	0	1	1
Total	1	2	3

== Archery ==
As per World Archery, each National Olympic Committee (NOC) could enter a maximum of six competitors with three per gender. NOCs that qualified teams were also allowed to have each member compete in the individual event with the remaining spots filled by individual qualification tournaments.

Chad initially secured a quota place in the men's individual recurve, by finishing in the top two, vying for qualification, at the 2019 African Games in Rabat, Morocco, but failed to meet the minimum score standard. However, Chadian archer Marlyse Hourtou received an invitation from the Tripartite Commission and World Archery to compete in the women's individual recurve event at the Games, signifying the country's debut in the sport.

The ranking rounds were held at the Yumenoshima Park in Tokyo on 23 July 2021. Hourtou was seeded 64th and last in the women's individual event. In the round of 64, she competed against eventual gold medalist and first seed An San of South Korea. She lost the match with a scoreline of 2-6, and did not advance to the next round.

Athlete	Event	Ranking round		Round of 64	Round of 32	Round of 16	Quarterfinals	Semifinals	Final / BM	
Athlete	Event	Score	Seed	Opposition Score	Opposition Score	Opposition Score	Opposition Score	Opposition Score	Opposition Score	Rank
Marlyse Hourtou	Women's individual	553	64	An S (KOR); L 2–6	did not advance					

== Athletics ==
As per the governing body World Athletics (WA), a NOC was allowed to enter up to three qualified athletes in each individual event and one qualified relay team if the Olympic Qualifying Standards (OQS) for the respective events had been met during the qualifying period. The remaining places were allocated based on the World Athletics Rankings which were derived from the average of the best five results for an athlete over the designated qualifying period, weighted by the importance of the meet.

Chad received a universality slot from the World Athletics to send a male track and field athlete to the Olympics. In the men's 400 m event, Bachir Mahamat finished eighth in the preliminary heats and did not advance further. This was Mahamat's second consecutive Olympics after he represented the nation in the previous Olympics in 2016 in the same event.

Key

- Note–Ranks given for track events are within the athlete's heat only
- Q = Qualified for the next round
- q = Qualified for the next round as a fastest loser or, in field events, by position without achieving the qualifying target
- NR = National record
- N/A = Round not applicable for the event
- Bye = Athlete not required to compete in round

Track & road events

Athlete	Event	Heat		Semifinal		Final	
Athlete	Event	Result	Rank	Result	Rank	Result	Rank
Bachir Mahamat	Men's 400 m	47.93 SB	8	Did not advance			

== Judo ==
Each NOC could enter a maximum of 14 judokas for the event with one in each weight division. The qualification was determined by the world ranking list prepared by International Judo Federation (IJF) as on 28 June 2021. The top 18 were awarded straight quotas apart from continental quotas that were awarded by IJF. Chad qualified one judoka for the women's middleweight category (70 kg) at the Games. Demos Memneloum accepted a continental berth from Africa as the nation's top-ranked judoka outside of direct qualifying position in the IJF World Ranking List of 28 June 2021.

The main event was held at the Nippon Budokan. Memneloum competed against Gulnoza Matniyazova of Uzbekistan in the round of 32. She lost the bout after the opponent scored an ippon and was eliminated from the competition.

Athlete	Event	Round of 32	Round of 16	Quarterfinals	Semifinals	Repechage	Final / BM	
Athlete	Event	Opposition Result	Opposition Result	Opposition Result	Opposition Result	Opposition Result	Opposition Result	Rank
Demos Memneloum	Women's –70 kg	Matniyazova (UZB); L 00–10	Did not advance					
