= Chad at the 2012 Summer Olympics =

- IOC code: CHA
- NOC: Chadian Olympic and Sports Committee

in London
- Competitors: 2 in 2 sports
- Flag bearers: Carine Ngarlemdana (opening); Hinikissia Ndikert (closing)
- Medals: Gold 0 Silver 0 Bronze 0 Total 0

Summer Olympics appearances (overview)
- 1964; 1968; 1972; 1976–1980; 1984; 1988; 1992; 1996; 2000; 2004; 2008; 2012; 2016; 2020; 2024

Chad competed at the 2012 Summer Olympics in London, which was held from 27 July to 12 August 2012. This marked the nation's eleventh appearance at the Summer Olympics since its debut in the 1964 Summer Olympics. The Chadian delegation included track and field athlete Hinikissia Ndikert and judoka Carine Ngarlemdana. Ngarlemdana was the flag bearer for the opening ceremony and Ndikert was the flag bearer for the closing ceremony. Neither of Chad's athletes progressed beyond the first round of their events. Chad was one of only two countries to have a female-only team at the 2012 games.

== Background ==
Chad, a landlocked country in Central Africa, participated in 11 Summer Olympic games between its debut in the 1964 Summer Olympics in Tokyo, Japan and the 2012 Summer Olympics in London. The highest number of Chadian athletes to have participated in the summer games is six in the 1988 Summer Olympics in Seoul, South Korea. As of 2016, no Chadian athlete has ever won a medal at the Olympics. Two athletes from Chad qualified for the London games; Hinikissia Ndikert in the women's track and field 200 metres and Carine Ngarlemdana in the women's 70 kilogram judo completion. Chad had no men competing for them; they and Bhutan were the only nations to send only female athletes to the 2012 games.

== Athletics ==
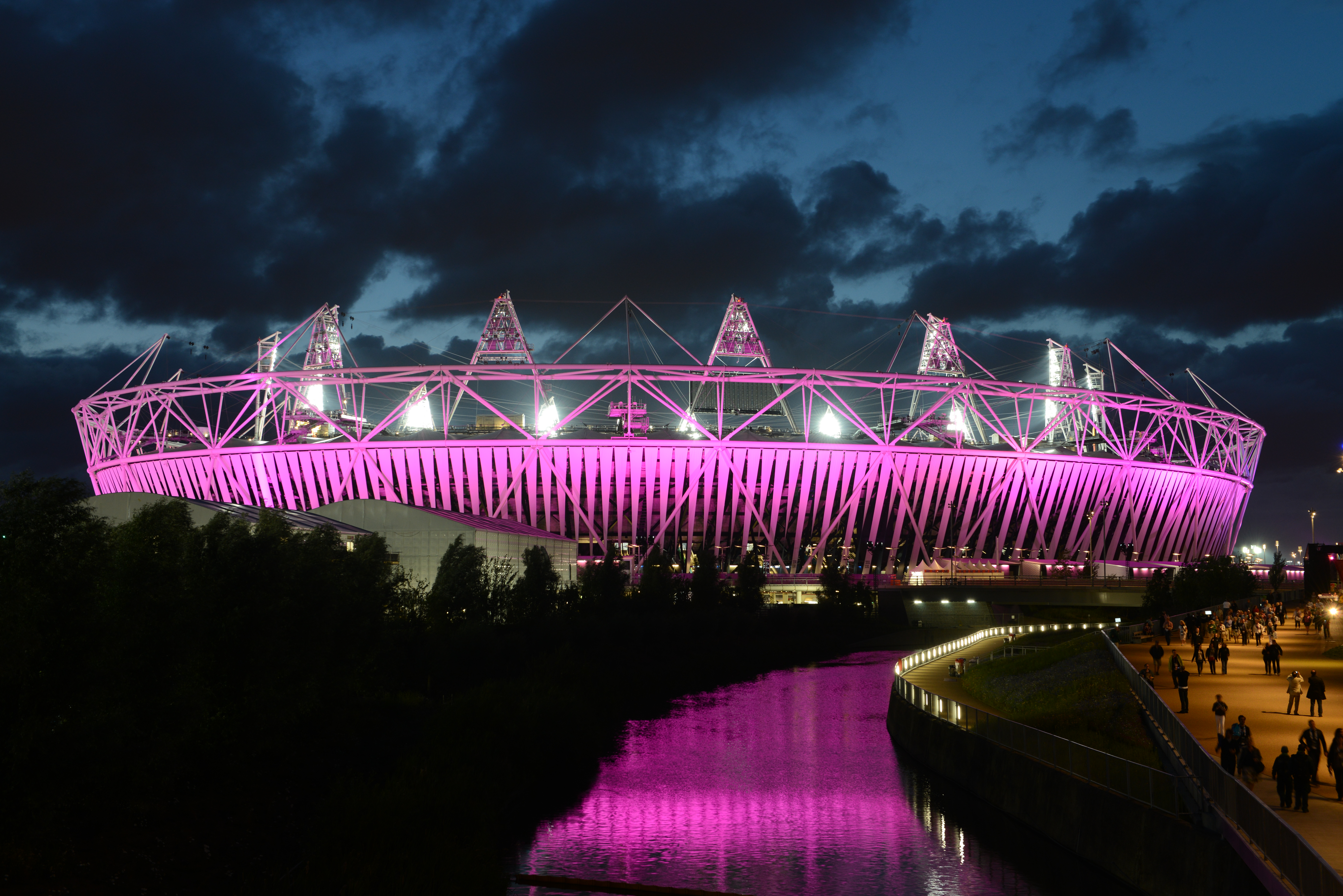
The Olympic Stadium, where Ndikert competed in her events

The 2012 Summer Games was Hinikissia Ndikert's second Olympics. At the 2008 Summer Olympics, age 15, she was her country's flag bearer for both ceremonies. In her competition she finished 64th out of 85 competitors in the 100 metres. For the 2012 Summer Olympics, Ndikert qualified for the 200 metres. She competed on 6 August in the first heat of her event. She ran a time of 26.06 seconds and finished last in her heat of eight athletes. She was 3.51 seconds behind the winner of the heat, Murielle Ahouré of Ivory Coast. Overall, Ndikert was the second-slowest athlete of any in the heat round. The only athlete she was faster than was Chan Seyha of Cambodia. Ndikert was 2.96 seconds slower than the slowest athlete that progressed to the semi-final round, and was therefore eliminated.

Key

- Note–Ranks given for track events are within the athlete's heat only
- Q = Qualified for the next round
- q = Qualified for the next round as a fastest loser or, in field events, by position without achieving the qualifying target
- Bye = Athlete not required to compete in round

Women

Athlete	Event	Heat		Semifinal		Final	
Athlete	Event	Result	Rank	Result	Rank	Result	Rank
Hinikissia Ndikert	200 m	26.06	8	Did not advance			

== Judo ==
Carine Ngarlemdana made her Olympic debut at the 2012 games. At the time she was 17 years of age. She was the flag bearer at both the opening and closing ceremonies. She was the third Chadian in Olympic history to compete in a judo event. Ngarlemdana qualified for the 70 kilogram event as an African Judo Union qualifier. On 1 August Ngarlemdana competed in the first round of her event. She was drawn against Sally Conway (Great Britain). Ngarlemdana lost 0002—1110 and was therefore eliminated from the competition. Overall she finished joint 17th and, along with five other athletes, last in the competition.

Athlete	Event	Round of 32	Round of 16	Quarterfinals	Semifinals	Repechage	Final / BM	
Athlete	Event	Opposition Result	Opposition Result	Opposition Result	Opposition Result	Opposition Result	Opposition Result	Rank
Carine Ngarlemdana	Women's −70 kg	Conway (GBR); L 0002–1110	Did not advance					
