= 2016 African Archery Championships =

- Location: Windhoek, Namibia
- Start date: 28 January
- End date: 31 January

The 2016 African Archery Championships was the 11th edition of the African Archery Championships. The event was held in Windhoek, the capital city of Namibia from 28 January to 31 January 2016.

The men's and women's individual recurve tournaments also served as continental qualifying tournaments for the 2016 Summer Olympics. 3 individual qualifying spots for each gender were available.

== Medal summary ==
=== Recurve ===
Event	Gold	Silver	Bronze
Men's individual	(Egypt) Ahmed El-Nemr	(Egypt) Hady Elkholosy	(South Africa) Terrence Van Moerkerken
Women's individual	(Kenya) Shehzana Anwar	(Egypt) Reem Mansour	(Egypt) Hania Fouda
Men's team	South Africa	Egypt	Morocco
Women's team	Egypt	South Africa	Algeria
Mixed team	Ivory Coast	Egypt	South Africa

=== Compound ===
Event	Gold	Silver	Bronze
Men's individual	(Namibia) Francois Marais	(South Africa) Riaan Crowther	(South Africa) Patrick Roux
Women's individual	(Egypt) Hala Elgibily	(Namibia) Beanta Viviers	(Egypt) Nancy Elgibily
Men's team	South Africa	Namibia	Egypt
Women's team	Egypt	South Africa	Namibia
Mixed team	South Africa	Egypt	Namibia

=== Medal table ===
Rank	Nation	Gold	Silver	Bronze	Total
1	Egypt	4	5	3	12
2	South Africa	3	3	3	9
3	Namibia	1	2	2	5
4	Ivory Coast	1	0	0	1
4	Kenya	1	0	0	1
6	Algeria	0	0	1	1
6	Morocco	0	0	1	1
Totals (7 entries)		10	10	10	30

== Results ==
=== Men's Individual Recurve ===
==== Qualification round ====
Key

Round of 32
Round of 64

Rank	Archer	Score	10	X
1	Hady Elkholosy (EGY)	636	21	5
2	Ahmed El-Nemr (EGY)	619	21	10
3	Vivien De Klerk (RSA)	607	5	1
4	Marco Di Matteo (RSA)	606	18	6
5	Mohammed Aly Amin (EGY)	601	10	1
6	Terrence Van Moerkerken (RSA)	599	15	6
7	René-Philippe Kouassi (CIV)	598	3	1
8	Gavin Sutherland (ZIM)	591	7	0
9	Ismail Elalaoui (MAR)	588	9	3
10	Mohamed Hammed (TUN)	584	10	0
11	Morokant Koffi Allassane (CIV)	575	12	2
12	Ali Saleh Elghrari (LBA)	561	12	4
13	Louis Gino Aurelien Juhel (MRI)	561	11	0
14	A. Arebi Abdulmomem (LBA)	553	7	2
15	Xander Reddig (NAM)	552	4	1
16	Stephan Klein (MRI)	549	7	2
17	Areneo David (MAW)	548	10	2
18	Mohamed Jelloun (MAR)	548	6	1
19	Saber Ben Brahim (TUN)	543	7	1
20	Jean Babet (MRI)	541	8	2
21	Adem Omran Huribesh (LBA)	530	7	1
22	Akpa Samuel Bethel Essis (CIV)	530	5	0
23	Israel Madaye (CHA)	506	0	0
24	Mounir Megherbi (ALG)	505	8	1
25	Mohamed Bouchane (MAR)	491	4	1
26	Karim Abdel Aggad (ALG)	488	2	1
27	Paul Grobler (NAM)	478	3	1
28	Josué Valgos Akonagbo (BEN)	475	3	1
29	Adriaan Grobler (NAM)	451	9	2
30	Woibogo Wodegue Torso (CHA)	418	1	0
31	Gabin Nguelet (CHA)	406	1	1
32	Adlene Serir (ALG)	404	1	0
33	Humayoon Poonja (ZIM)	403	3	3

=== Men's Individual Compound ===
==== Qualification round ====
Key

Quarterfinals
Round of 16

Rank	Archer	Score	10	X
1	Patrick Roux (RSA)	679	39	14
2	Francois Marais (NAM)	668	28	7
3	Ahmed Fakhry (RSA)	667	28	10
4	Seppie Cilliers (RSA)	662	28	12
5	Riaan Crowther (RSA)	656	32	9
6	Louw Nel (NAM)	653	25	12
7	Khaled Elsaid (EGY)	649	22	7
8	Henri How Kemg Fat (MRI)	635	16	5
9	Ahmed Alaa Helal (EGY)	634	21	10
10	Ben van Wyk (NAM)	616	12	5
11	El Mehdi Hamdoune (MAR)	585	0	0
12	Youssef Bouyablane (MAR)	571	12	8
13	Mohamed Ch-Chakouri (MAR)	516	6	1
14	Bryan Chukumbo (ZIM)	502	0	0
15	Zane Young (KEN)	459	0	0

=== Women's Individual Recurve ===
==== Qualification round ====
Key

Round of 32
Round of 64

Rank	Archer	Score	10	X
1	Carla Frangilli (CIV)	579	11	5
2	Hania Fouda (EGY)	577	10	3
3	Amira Mansour (EGY)	576	12	4
4	Sandra Prinsloo (RSA)	574	0	0
5	Shehzana Anwar (KEN)	572	9	2
6	Reem Mansour (EGY)	562	9	2
7	Karen Hultzer (RSA)	557	4	0
8	Loubna Farfra (MAR)	542	8	3
9	Yolandi Van Dyk (RSA)	503	6	0
10	Hana El Mansouri (MAR)	474	7	2
11	Amina Rezig (ALG)	458	0	0
12	Merveille Zinsou (BEN)	403	6	2
13	Yasmine Tikarouchine (ALG)	401	1	0
14	Sarah Bouhaha (ALG)	395	5	2
15	Fatou Gbane (CIV)	296	0	0
16	Marlyse Hourtou (CHA)	216	0	0
17	Stephanie Alaina (CHA)	94	0	0
18	Alphosine Foulkouna (CHA)	88	0	0

=== Women's Individual Compound ===
==== Qualification round ====
Key

Quarterfinals
Round of 16

Rank	Archer	Score	10	X
1	Nancy Elgibily (EGY)	654	24	8
2	Lizeth De Wet (RSA)	653	27	6
3	Lizl Kuschke (RSA)	638	19	4
4	Hala Elgibily (EGY)	624	13	7
5	Elisabeth Taljaard (NAM)	620	17	2
6	Ilana Malan (NAM)	602	13	5
7	Beanta Viviers (NAM)	595	12	3
8	Hana Taha (EGY)	587	9	4
9	Chadia El Asadi (MAR)	574	0	0
10	Lilian Brink (RSA)	572	11	6
11	Souad El Faiz (MAR)	536	6	3
12	Nikita Behr (KEN)	454	0	0
13	Mina Tritichi (MAR)	385	4	2
14	Tania Nicole Engels (ZIM)	311	0	2

=== Men's Team Recurve ===
==== Qualification round ====
Key

Quarterfinals
Round of 16

Rank	Team	Archers	Score
1	Egypt	Hady Elkholosy; Ahmed El-Nemr; Mohammed Aly Amin	1856
2	South Africa	Vivien De Klerk; Marco Di Matteo; Terrence Van Moerkerken	1812
3	Ivory Coast	René-Philippe Kouassi; Morokant Koffi Allassane; Akpa Samuel Bethel Essis	1703
4	Mauritius	Louis Gino Aurelien Juhel; Stephan Klein; Jean Babet	1651
5	Libya	Ali Saleh Elghrari; A. Arebi Abdulmomem; Adem Omran Huribesh	1644
6	Morocco	Ismail Elalaoui; Mohamed Jelloun; Mohamed Bouchane	1627
7	Namibia	Xander Reddig; Paul Grobler; Adriaan Grobler	1481
8	Algeria	Mounir Megherbi; Karim Abdel Aggad; Adlene Serir	1397
9	Chad	Israel Madaye; Woibogo Wodegue Torso; Gabin Nguelet	1330

=== Women's Team Recurve ===
==== Qualification round ====
Key

Semifinals

Rank	Team	Archers	Score
1	Egypt	Hania Fouda; Amira Mansour; Reem Mansour	1715
2	South Africa	Sandra Prinsloo; Karen Hultzer; Yolandi Van Dyk	1634
3	Algeria	Amina Rezig; Yasmine Tikarouchine; Sarah Bouhaha	1254
4	Chad	Marlyse Hourtou; Stephanie Alaina; Alphosine Foulkouna	398

=== Mixed Team Recurve ===
==== Qualification round ====
Key

Quarterfinals

Rank	Team	Archers	Score
1	Egypt	Hania Fouda; Hady Elkholosy	1213
2	South Africa	Sandra Prinsloo; Vivien De Klerk	1181
3	Ivory Coast	Carla Frangilli; Philippe Kouassi	1177
4	Morocco	Loubna Farfra; Ismail Elalaoui	1130
5	Algeria	Amina Rezig; Mounir Megherbi	963
6	Benin	Merveille Zinsou; Josué Valgos Akonagbo	878
6	Chad	Marlyse Hourtou; Israel Madaye	722
