= Chad at the 2024 Summer Olympics =

- IOC code: CHA
- NOC: Chadian Olympic and Sports Committee

in Paris, France 26 July 2024 – 11 August 2024
- Competitors: 3 (2 men and 1 woman) in 3 sports
- Flag bearers: Israel Madaye & Demos Memneloum
- Medals: Gold 0 Silver 0 Bronze 0 Total 0

Summer Olympics appearances (overview)
- 1964; 1968; 1972; 1976–1980; 1984; 1988; 1992; 1996; 2000; 2004; 2008; 2012; 2016; 2020; 2024

Chad competed at the 2024 Summer Olympics in Paris, France from 26 July to 11 August 2024. The country's participation in Paris marked its fourteenth appearance at the Summer Olympics since its debut in 1964, except for two occasions, one in 1976, as well as the Congolese-led boycott, and the one in 1980, as well as the nation joined the US led boycott.

== Competitors ==
The following list is the number of competitors who will compete at the Games.

Sport	Men	Women	Total
Archery	1	0	1
Athletics	1	0	1
Judo	0	1	1
Total	2	1	3

== Archery ==
Chad qualified two archers in men's and women's individual recurve as well as the mixed team, due to a top finish at the 2023 African Continental Qualification Tournament in Nabeul, Tunisia. Later on, Chad only sent one archer for the games, because the women archer did not achieve the MQS.

Athlete	Event	Ranking round		Round of 64	Round of 32	Round of 16	Quarterfinals	Semifinals	Final / BM	
Athlete	Event	Score	Seed	Opposition Score	Opposition Score	Opposition Score	Opposition Score	Opposition Score	Opposition Score	Rank
Israel Madaye	Men's individual	600	64	Kim W-j (KOR); L 0–6	Did not advance					

== Athletics ==
Chadian track and field athletes qualified for Paris 2024, by receiving the direct universality spots in the following event:

Key

- Note–Ranks given for track events are within the athlete's heat only
- Q = Qualified for the next round
- q = Qualified for the next round as a fastest loser or, in field events, by position without achieving the qualifying target
- NR = National record
- N/A = Round not applicable for the event
- Bye = Athlete not required to compete in round

Track and road events

Athlete	Event	Final	
Athlete	Event	Result	Rank
Valentin Betoudji	Men's marathon	2:32:11	70

== Judo ==
Chad qualified one judoka for the following weight class at the Games. Demos Memneloum qualified for the games through the allocations of universality places.

Athlete	Event	Round of 32	Round of 16	Quarterfinals	Semifinals	Repechage	Final / BM	
Athlete	Event	Opposition Result	Opposition Result	Opposition Result	Opposition Result	Opposition Result	Opposition Result	Rank
Demos Memneloum	Women's –70 kg	Pogačnik (SLO); L 00–10	Did not advance					
