= Chad at the 1984 Summer Olympics =

- IOC code: CHA
- NOC: Chadian Olympic and Sports Committee

in Los Angeles
- Competitors: 3 in 1 sport
- Flag bearer: Ousman Miangoto
- Medals: Gold 0 Silver 0 Bronze 0 Total 0

Summer Olympics appearances (overview)
- 1964; 1968; 1972; 1976–1980; 1984; 1988; 1992; 1996; 2000; 2004; 2008; 2012; 2016; 2020; 2024

Chad was represented at the 1984 Summer Olympics in Los Angeles, California, United States by the Chadian Olympic and Sports Committee.

In total, three athletes – all men – represented Chad in one sport: athletics.

== Background ==
The Chadian Olympic and Sports Committee was founded in 1963 and Chad made their Olympic debut at the 1964 Summer Olympics in Tokyo, Japan. They participated in the following two games before taking part in the African boycott of the 1976 Summer Olympics in Montreal, Quebec, Canada. They also took part in the United States-led boycott of the 1980 Summer Olympics in Moscow, Russian Soviet Federative Socialist Republic, Soviet Union. The 1984 Summer Olympics in Los Angeles, California, United States marked their fourth appearance at the Olympics. Prior to 1984, Chad had not won an Olympic medal.

== Competitors ==
In total, three athletes represented Chad at the 1984 Summer Olympics in Los Angeles, California, United States across one sport.

Sport	Men	Women	Total
Athletics	3	0	3
Total	3	0	3

== Athletics ==
In total, three Chadian athletes participated in the athletics events – Kémobé Djirmassal in the men's long jump, Issaka Hassane in the men's 400 m and Ousman Miangoto in the men's 800 m.

The athletics events took place at the Los Angeles Memorial Coliseum in Exposition Park, Los Angeles from 3 to 12 August 1984.

Athlete	Event	Heat		Quarterfinal		Semifinal		Final	
Athlete	Event	Result	Rank	Result	Rank	Result	Rank	Result	Rank
Issaka Hassane	400 m	49.64	8	did not advance					
Ousman Miangoto	800 m	1:56.02	8	did not advance					

Field events

Athlete	Event	Qualification		Final	
Athlete	Event	Distance	Position	Distance	Position
Kémobé Djirmassal	Long jump	7.37	17	did not advance	

== Aftermath ==
Following the boycotts, Chad became a regular competitor at the Olympics. They sent a record delegation of six athletes to the subsequent two games – the 1988 Summer Olympics in Seoul, South Korea and the 1992 Summer Olympics in Barcelona, Spain. As of the 2024 Summer Olympics in Paris, France, Chad has not won an Olympic medal.

== Sources ==
- Official Olympic Reports
