= Chad at the 2000 Summer Olympics =

- IOC code: CHA
- NOC: Chadian Olympic and Sports Committee

in Sydney
- Competitors: 2 in 1 sport
- Flag bearer: Gana Abba Kimet
- Medals: Gold 0 Silver 0 Bronze 0 Total 0

Summer Olympics appearances (overview)
- 1964; 1968; 1972; 1976–1980; 1984; 1988; 1992; 1996; 2000; 2004; 2008; 2012; 2016; 2020; 2024

Chad competed at the 2000 Summer Olympics in Sydney, Australia.

== Background ==
The 2000 Summer Olympics were held from 15 September to 1 October 2000; a total of 10,651 athletes represented 199 NOCs.

== Competitors ==
The following is the list of number of competitors in the Games.

Sport	Men	Women	Total
Athletics	1	1	2
Total	1	1	2

== Athletics ==
Key

- Note–Ranks given for track events are within the athlete's heat only
- Q = Qualified for the next round
- q = Qualified for the next round as a fastest loser or, in field events, by position without achieving the qualifying target
- NR = National record
- N/A = Round not applicable for the event
- Bye = Athlete not required to compete in round

Men
Track

Athlete	Event	Heat		Quarterfinal		Semifinal		Final	
Athlete	Event	Result	Rank	Result	Rank	Result	Rank	Result	Rank
Moumi Sébergué	100 m	11.00	7	did not advance					

Women
Track

Athlete	Event	Heat		Quarterfinal		Semifinal		Final	
Athlete	Event	Result	Rank	Result	Rank	Result	Rank	Result	Rank
Kaltouma Nadjina	200 m	23.81	7	did not advance					
Kaltouma Nadjina	400 m	52.54	4 q	52.60	7	did not advance			
