= Chad at the 1972 Summer Olympics =

- IOC code: CHA
- NOC: Chadian Olympic and Sports Committee

in Munich
- Competitors: 4 in 2 sports
- Flag bearer: Ahmed Senoussi
- Medals: Gold 0 Silver 0 Bronze 0 Total 0

Summer Olympics appearances (overview)
- 1964; 1968; 1972; 1976–1980; 1984; 1988; 1992; 1996; 2000; 2004; 2008; 2012; 2016; 2020; 2024

Chad competed at the 1972 Summer Olympics in Munich, West Germany.

== Athletics ==
Key

- Note–Ranks given for track events are within the athlete's heat only
- Q = Qualified for the next round
- q = Qualified for the next round as a fastest loser or, in field events, by position without achieving the qualifying target
- NR = National record
- N/A = Round not applicable for the event
- Bye = Athlete not required to compete in round

Men

Athlete	Event	Heat		Quarterfinal		Semifinal		Final	
Athlete	Event	Result	Rank	Result	Rank	Result	Rank	Result	Rank
Saleh Alah-Djaba	100 m	10.65	2 Q	10.51	7	Did not advance			
Saleh Alah-Djaba	200 m	Did not finish	Did not advance						
Gana Abba Kimet	100 m	10.89	5	Did not advance					

Field events

Athlete	Event	Qualification		Final	
Athlete	Event	Distance	Position	Distance	Position
Ahmed Senoussi	High jump	2.00	35	Did not advance	

== Boxing ==
Athlete	Event	Round of 64	Round of 32	Round of 16	Quarterfinals	Semifinals	Final
Athlete	Event	Opposition Result	Opposition Result	Opposition Result	Opposition Result	Opposition Result	Opposition Result
Noureddine Aman Hassan	Light-heavyweight	Mate Parlov (YUG); L TKO-2	Did not advance				

== Sources ==
- Official Olympic Reports
