= Chad at the 2008 Summer Olympics =

- IOC code: CHA
- NOC: Chadian Olympic and Sports Committee

in Beijing
- Competitors: 2 in 1 sports
- Flag bearer: Hinikissia Albertine Ndikert
- Medals: Gold 0 Silver 0 Bronze 0 Total 0

Summer Olympics appearances (overview)
- 1964; 1968; 1972; 1976–1980; 1984; 1988; 1992; 1996; 2000; 2004; 2008; 2012; 2016; 2020; 2024; 2028

Chad sent a delegation of two athletes to compete at the 2008 Summer Olympics in Beijing, China: Moumi Sébergué, who competed in the men's 100 meters, and Hinikissia Albertine Ndikert, who competed in the women's 100 meters and also bore the Chadian flag during ceremonies. The appearance of this delegation marked the tenth appearance of Chad at the Summer Olympics, the first been in 1964 Summer Olympics in Tokyo, Japan, and its seventh appearance since its Olympic hiatus between 1976 and 1980. Both Sébergué and Ndikert ranked seventh in their respective heats and did not advance past the qualification round. As of the end of the 2012 London Olympics, there have been no medalists from Chad.

== Background ==
Chad is a landlocked country in Africa whose northern region lies within the eastern reaches of the Sahara Desert and whose southern region lies within the eastern portion of the Sahel. It borders Libya to the south, Niger to the east, Sudan to the west, and the Central African Republic to the north. Chad was originally part of French West Africa until 1960, when it declared independence. Some four years later, the former French colony made its début at the 1964 Summer Olympics in Tokyo, Japan. For the next three decades, Chad became embroiled in civil war and experienced invasions by Libya and upheavals by Sudanese-backed rebels; the civil war ended in 1990, although rebel threats had persisted between then and 2008. During Chad's greatest era of instability, athletes from the country did not attend the 1976 Summer Olympics in Montréal, Quebec, Canada or the 1980 Summer Olympics in Moscow, USSR, although delegations were sent to all other games between 1964 and 2008.

The largest Chadian delegation to reach the Olympics appeared in the 1988 Summer Olympics in Seoul, South Korea and at the 1992 Summer Olympics in Barcelona, Spain; each time, Chad's National Olympic Committee sent six athletes. During the 1992 games, the NOC sent the nation's first female Olympian. Since then (and up to the Beijing games), at least one woman has been a part of the Chadian delegation. The smallest contingency of Chadian Olympians occurred during the 2004 Summer Olympics in Athens, Greece, when only Kaltouma Nadjina competed on the country's behalf. The delegation that arrived in Beijing consisted of two athletes—one man (30-year-old Moumi Sébergué) and one woman (15-year-old Hinikissia Albertine Ndikert), both participants in track events. Ndikert was Chad's flagbearer at the ceremonies. Up to and including the Beijing games, there has yet to have been a medalist from Chad.

== Athletics ==
Competitors in athletics events could qualify for the next round of competition in two ways. Qualifying by right was posting a high result in their own heat, and qualifying by result was posting a high result in overall standings. Ranks shown are thus those within each heat, not in overall standings.

Moumi Sébergué represented Chad at the Beijing Olympics in the men's 100 meters dash. Born in 1977, Sébergué first participated in the Olympics at age 22 when he raced in the men's 100 meters at the 2000 Summer Olympics in Sydney, Australia, placing seventh in his qualification heat and not progressing to later rounds. He did not attend the 2004 Summer Olympics in Athens, Greece, but returned to the Olympics at Beijing at the age of 30. During the course of the August 14, 2008 races in his event, when the qualification round took place, Sébergué competed in the tenth heat against seven other athletes. He finished the race in 11.14 seconds, placing seventh in the heat ahead of Tuvalu's Okinali Tinilau (11.48 seconds) and behind Gabon's Wilfried Bingangoye (10.87 seconds) in a heat led by the Netherlands Antilles' Churandy Martina (10.35 seconds) and Japan's Naoki Tsukahara (10.39 seconds). Of the 80 athletes who participated in the events, the Chadian sprinter ranked 70th. He did not advance to later rounds.

Hinikissia Albertine Ndikert competed on Chad's behalf as the national delegation's only female athlete at the Beijing games. She participated in the women's 100 meters dash, and was 15 years old at the time of the competition. Ndikert had not previously competed in any Olympic games. During the qualification round of the event, which took place on August 15, 2008, Ndikert competed in the eighth heat against seven other athletes. She finished the race in 12.55 seconds, placing seventh; she defeated the Democratic Republic of the Congo's Franka Magali (12.57 seconds) and fell behind Papua New Guinea's Mae Koime (11.68 seconds) in a heat led by Nigeria's Damola Osayomi (11.13 seconds) and the Bahamas' Debbie Ferguson-McKenzie (11.17 seconds). Of the event's 85 competitors, Ndikert finished in 64th place. Therefore, Ndikert did not advance to round two and beyond.

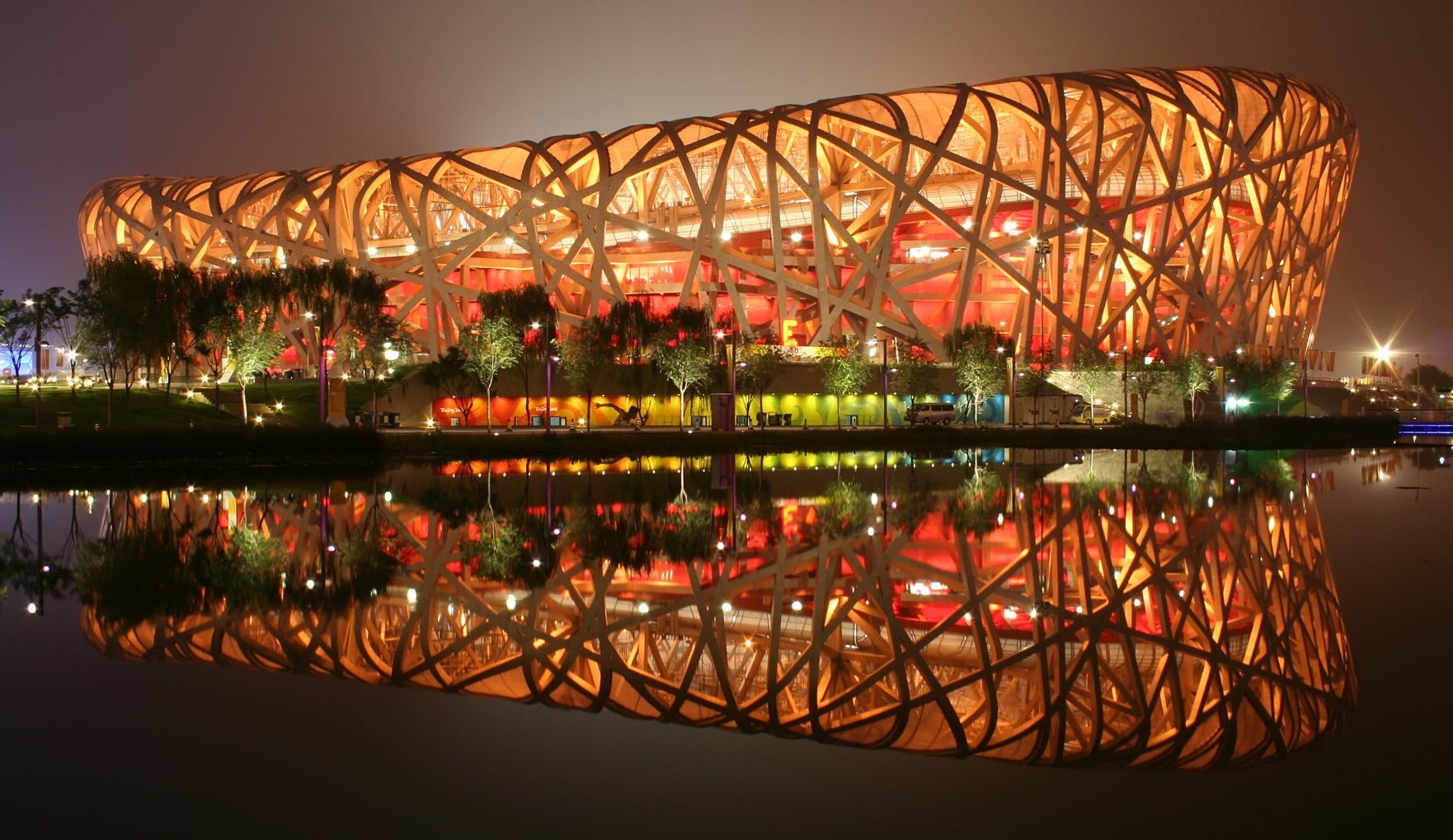
The Beijing National Stadium, where Ndikert and Sébergué competed in their events

Athlete	Event	Heat		Quarterfinal		Semifinal		Final	
Athlete	Event	Result	Rank	Result	Rank	Result	Rank	Result	Rank
Hinikissia Albertine Ndikert	Women's 100 m	12.55	7	Did not advance					
Moumi Sebergue	Men's 100 m	11.41	7	Did not advance					

Key

- Note–Ranks given for track events are within the athlete's heat only
- Q = Qualified for the next round
- q = Qualified for the next round as a fastest loser or, in field events, by position without achieving the qualifying target
- NR = National record
- N/A = Round not applicable for the event
- Bye = Athlete not required to compete in round
