= Chad at the 2016 Summer Olympics =

- IOC code: CHA
- NOC: Chadian Olympic and Sports Committee

in Rio de Janeiro
- Competitors: 2 in 1 sport
- Flag bearer: Bibiro Ali Taher
- Medals: Gold 0 Silver 0 Bronze 0 Total 0

Summer Olympics appearances (overview)
- 1964; 1968; 1972; 1976–1980; 1984; 1988; 1992; 1996; 2000; 2004; 2008; 2012; 2016; 2020; 2024

Chad competed at the 2016 Summer Olympics in Rio de Janeiro, Brazil, from 5 to 21 August 2016. The country's participation in Rio de Janeiro marked its twelfth appearance at the Summer Olympics since its debut in 1964. The delegation included two track and field athletes: Bachir Mahamat in the men's 400 metres and Bibiro Ali Taher in the women's 5000 metres. Both athletes participated at the Games through wild card places since they did not meet the required standards to qualify. Neither athletes progressed past their heats.

== Background ==
Chad participated in 12 Summer Olympics between its debut at the 1964 Summer Games in Tokyo, Japan, and the 2016 Summer Olympics in Rio de Janeiro, Brazil. The only occasions in that period which they did not attend was at the 1976 Summer Olympics in Montreal, Quebec, Canada, and the 1980 Summer Olympics in Moscow, Soviet Union. On both occasions, it was because they had joined with international boycotts of the events. The first boycott was because of the inclusion of the New Zealand team at the Games despite the breach of the international sports boycott of South Africa by the nation's rugby union team shortly prior. In 1980, Chad joined with the United States led boycott over the 1979 invasion of Afghanistan during the Soviet–Afghan War.

The highest number of Chadians participating at any one Games was six at both the 1988 Summer Games in Seoul, South Korea, and at the 1992 Summer Olympics in Barcelona, Spain. No Chadian has ever won a medal at an Olympics.

The National Olympic Committee (NOC) of Chad (French: Comité Olympique et Sportif Tchadien, COST), selected two athletes using wildcard slots. An NOC was able to enter up to three qualified athletes in each individual event at the 2016 Games as long as each athlete met the "A" standard, or one athlete per event if they met the "B" standard. However, since Chad had no athletes that met either standard, they were allowed to select two athletes, one of each gender, as wildcards. Chad was one of several countries who sent a delegation of two athletes in 2016, with only Tuvalu sending a single competitor.

The Chadian team at the 2016 Games was announced by a press release from COST General Idriss Dokony Adiker on 6 June. The team consisted of two track and field athletes at the Games: sprinter Bachir Mahamat and long-distance runner Bibiro Ali Taher, who was selected to carry the nation's flag in the opening ceremony. While Taher had competed for Chad at a number of international athletics competitions, she was a flight attendant by trade.

== Athletics ==
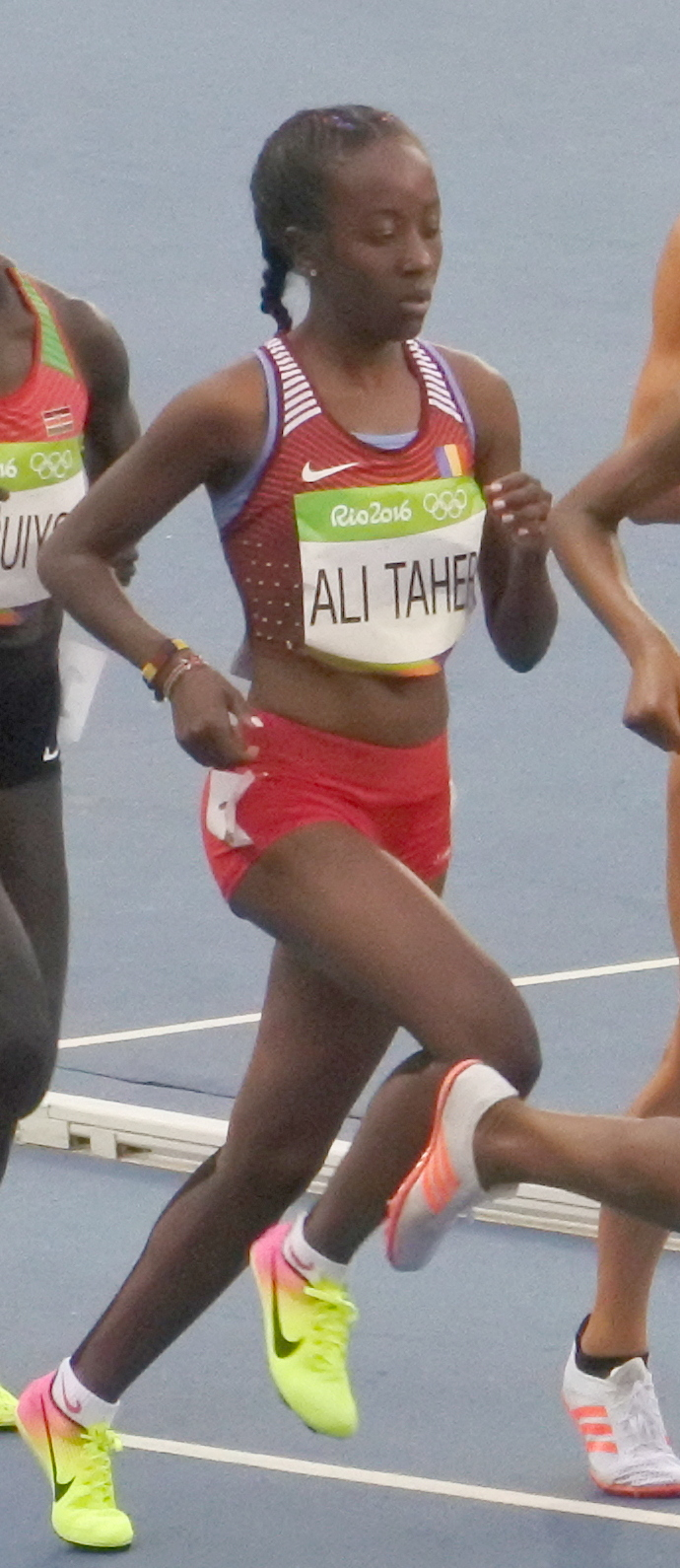
Bibiro Ali Taher, competing in the women's 5000 metres at the 2016 Summer Olympics

Chad was represented by one male athlete at the 2016 Games in athletics – Bachir Mahamat in the 400 metres. Mahamat competed on 12 August in the second heat. He placed seventh, with a time of 48.59 seconds, some 3.44 seconds behind the winner, Bralon Taplin of Grenada. The only runner he placed ahead of in his heat was Anas Beshr of Egypt, who had been disqualified for exiting his lane on the track. Only the first three athletes from each heat progressed to the next round, and so Mahamat's Olympics ended after that single run. His time placed him in 48th place out of 50 athletes overall, based on times in the first round.

The country's sole female athlete at the 2016 Games was Bibiro Ali Taher, who competed in the 5000 metres. She participated on 16 August in the second heat of the competition. Taher was towards the back of the field as she passed the line on her second to last lap, when she heard the bell indicating the final lap. This was not meant for her, but instead for runners who were a full lap ahead of her. She mistakenly thought the bell indicated that it was her final lap, and so pulled up after another 400 metres. As such, she did not finish her race. She later said in an interview, "I gave everything I could. I worked like crazy these past twelve months. I have no regrets, but I had tears in my eyes because I wanted to leave Rio with a new record."

Key

- Note–Ranks given for track events are within the athlete's heat only
- Q = Qualified for the next round
- q = Qualified for the next round as a fastest loser or, in field events, by position without achieving the qualifying target
- NR = National record
- N/A = Round not applicable for the event
- Bye = Athlete not required to compete in round

Track & road events

Athlete	Event	Heat		Semifinal		Final	
Athlete	Event	Result	Rank	Result	Rank	Result	Rank
Bachir Mahamat	Men's 400 m	48.59	7	Did not advance			
Bibiro Ali Taher	Women's 5000 m	DNF		—N/a		Did not advance	
