= Chad at the 1968 Summer Olympics =

- IOC code: CHA
- NOC: Chadian Olympic and Sports Committee

in Mexico City
- Competitors: 3 in 1 sport
- Medals: Gold 0 Silver 0 Bronze 0 Total 0

Summer Olympics appearances (overview)
- 1964; 1968; 1972; 1976–1980; 1984; 1988; 1992; 1996; 2000; 2004; 2008; 2012; 2016; 2020; 2024

Chad competed at the 1968 Summer Olympics in Mexico City, Mexico. It was the second appearance of the African nation, which made its debut in 1964.

== Athletics ==
Key

- Note–Ranks given for track events are within the athlete's heat only
- Q = Qualified for the next round
- q = Qualified for the next round as a fastest loser or, in field events, by position without achieving the qualifying target
- NR = National record
- N/A = Round not applicable for the event
- Bye = Athlete not required to compete in round

Men

Athlete	Event	Heat		Semifinal		Final	
Athlete	Event	Result	Rank	Result	Rank	Result	Rank
Ahmed Issa	800 m	1:49.0	4	did not advance			
Ahmed Issa	1500 m	3:53.1	4 Q	3:53.2	8	did not advance	

Field events

Athlete	Event	Qualification		Final	
Athlete	Event	Distance	Position	Distance	Position
Mahamat Idriss	High jump	2.06	21	did not advance	
Ahmed Senoussi	High jump	2.14	4 Q	2.09	12
