= Chad at the Olympics =

- IOC code: CHA
- NOC: Chadian Olympic and Sports Committee
- Medals: Gold 0 Silver 0 Bronze 0 Total 0

Summer appearances
- 1964; 1968; 1972; 1976–1980; 1984; 1988; 1992; 1996; 2000; 2004; 2008; 2012; 2016; 2020; 2024; 2028

Chad has sent athletes to every Summer Olympic Games held between 1964 and 1972 (boycotting 1976 and 1980 editions) and from 1984 onwards. Chad has never won an Olympic medal, with its highest finish to date being 9th, achieved by high jumper Mahamat Idriss at the men's event at the 1964 Summer Olympics. No athletes from Chad have competed in any Winter Olympic Games.

The National Olympic Committee for Chad is the Comité Olympique et Sportif Tchadien. It was started in 1963 and recognized in 1964.

== Medal tables ==
=== Medals by Summer Games ===
Games	Athletes	Gold	Silver	Bronze	Total	Rank
(Japan) 1964 Tokyo	2	0	0	0	0	–
1968 Mexico City	3	0	0	0	0	–
(West Germany) 1972 Munich	4	0	0	0	0	–
(Canada) 1976 Montreal	boycotted					
(Soviet Union) 1980 Moscow	boycotted					
(United States) 1984 Los Angeles	3	0	0	0	0	–
(South Korea) 1988 Seoul	6	0	0	0	0	–
(Spain) 1992 Barcelona	4	0	0	0	0	–
(United States) 1996 Atlanta	4	0	0	0	0	–
(Australia) 2000 Sydney	2	0	0	0	0	–
(Greece) 2004 Athens	2	0	0	0	0	–
(China) 2008 Beijing	2	0	0	0	0	–
(United Kingdom) 2012 London	2	0	0	0	0	–
(Brazil) 2016 Rio de Janeiro	2	0	0	0	0	–
(Japan) 2020 Tokyo	3	0	0	0	0	–
(France) 2024 Paris	3	0	0	0	0	–
(United States) 2028 Los Angeles	future event					
(Australia) 2032 Brisbane	future event					
Total		0	0	0	0	–

== See also ==
- List of flag bearers for Chad at the Olympics
- Category:Olympic competitors for Chad
