= Miyuki Uehara =

Japanese long-distance runner

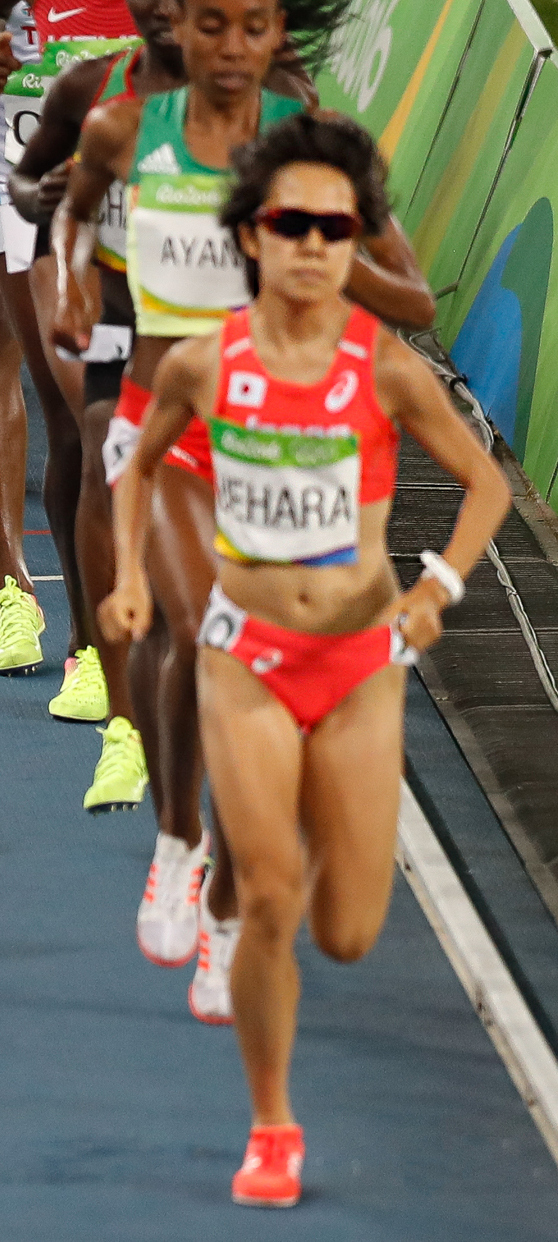
- Uehara leading the 5000 m final at the 2016 Olympics

Personal information
- Nationality: Japanese
- Born: 22 November 1995 (age 30) Kagoshima City, Kagoshima Prefecture, Japan
- Height: 1.54 m (5 ft 1 in)
- Weight: 39 kg (86 lb)

Sport
- Sport: Track and field
- Events: 5000 metres, 10,000 metres
- Coached by: Sachiko Yamashita

Achievements and titles
- Personal bests: 1500 m – 4:19.71 (2012); 3000 m – 9:06.91 (2012); 5000 m – 15:21.40 (2015); 10,000 m – 31:38.80 (2016); 10 km – 34:16 (2016)

Miyuki Uehara (Japanese: 上原 美幸; born 22 November 1995) is a Japanese female long-distance runner who competes in the 5000 metres and 10,000 metres.

Born in Kagoshima, she attended high school there and after graduation became a professional corporate runner with Dai-ichi Life. She made her first progress at senior national level in 2015, coming seventh at the Japanese National Games, then took fifth over 5000 m at the 2016 Japan Championships in Athletics.

As a junior athlete, she made her breakthrough at the Asian Cross Country Championships, leading the Japanese in the individual and team events for two junior gold medals. Later that year, she placed eighth on the track in the 3000 metres at the 2012 World Junior Championships in Athletics. She was on Japan's fourth-placed junior team at the 2013 IAAF World Cross Country Championships. In 2015, she improved her track bests to 15:21.40 minutes for the 5000 m and 32:16.66 minutes for the 10,000 m.

Under the guidance of coach Sachiko Yamashita (a former world medallist in the marathon), she gained selection for Japan at the 2016 Summer Olympics and, after front-running her heat, she made it to the Olympic 5000 m final – only the second Japanese woman to achieve that feat.

== International competitions ==
| Year | Competition | Venue | Position | Event | Notes |
|---|---|---|---|---|---|
| 2012 | Asian Cross Country Championships | Qingzhen, China | 1st | Junior race | |
| 2012 | Asian Cross Country Championships | Qingzhen, China | 1st | Junior team | |
| 2012 | World Junior Championships | Barcelona, Spain | 8th | 3000 m | 9:21.81 |
| 2013 | World Cross Country Championships | Bydgoszcz, Poland | 19th | Junior race | 19:32 |
| 2013 | World Cross Country Championships | Bydgoszcz, Poland | 4th | Junior team | 90 pts |
| 2016 | Olympic Games | Rio de Janeiro, Brazil | 15th | 5000 m | 15:34.97 |
| 2017 | World Championships | London, United Kingdom | 24th | 10,000 m | 32:31.58 |
