= Israel Madaye =

Chadian archer (born 1988)

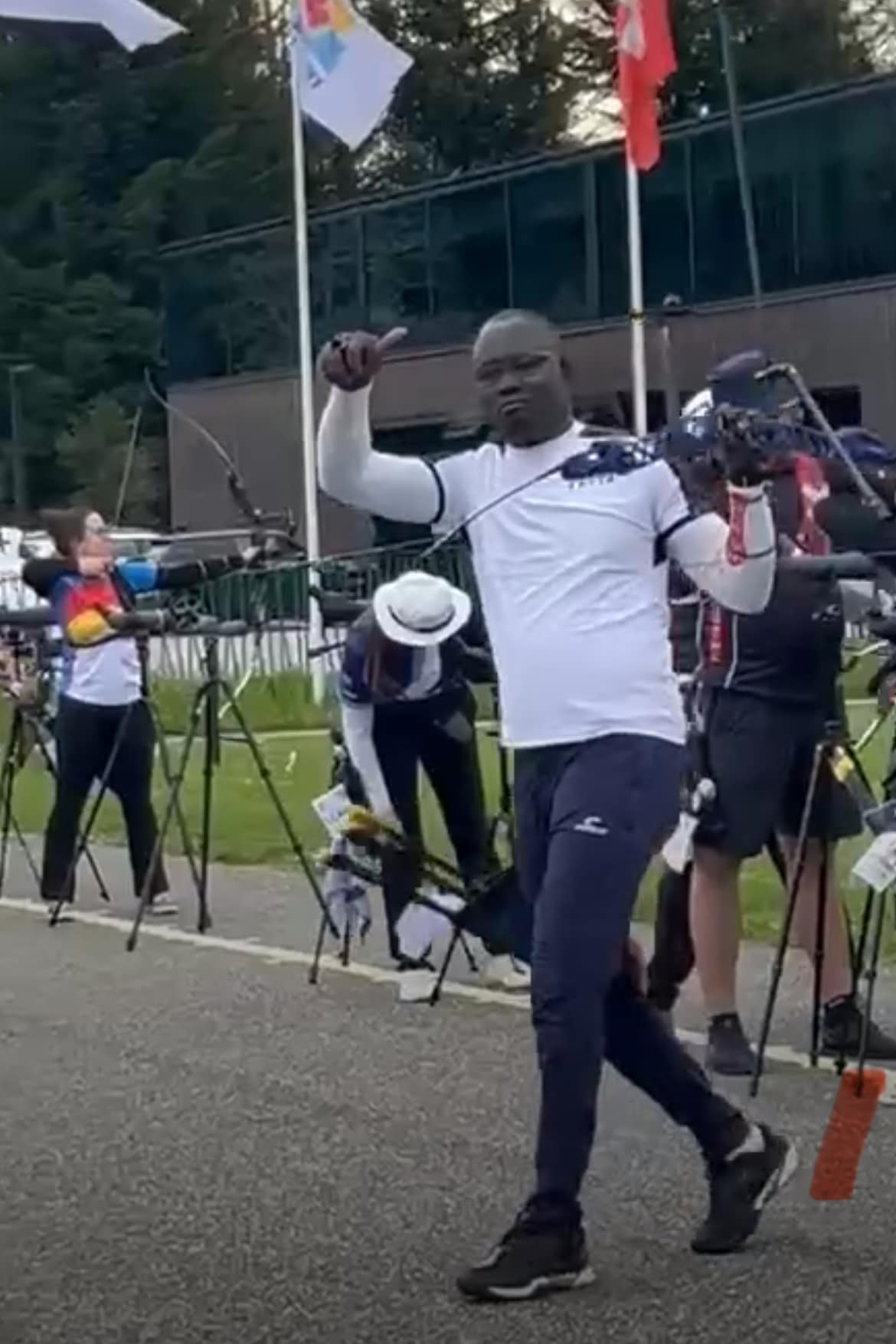
- Madaye in 2024

Personal information
- Nationality: Chadian
- Born: 23 March 1988 (age 38)

Sport
- Sport: Archery
Medal record
Men's recurve archery
Representing Chad
African Games
Bronze medal – third place	2019 Rabat	Mixed team
Bronze medal – third place	2019 Rabat	Team

Israel Madaye (born 23 March 1988) is a Chadian archer. A bronze medalist at the 2019 African Games, he qualified to compete at the 2024 Paris Olympics.

== Career ==
A keen footballer in his youth, he began archery at the age of 19 years old. He won a regional event in Niger in 2013 and went on to reach the quarter-finals at the 2016 African Archery Championships in Windhoek, Namibia.

He won the bronze medal in the mixed team recurve event with Marlyse Hourtou at the 2019 African Games in Rabat. At the Games, he also finished fourth in the individual event and won bronze in the team event.

In 2023, he won the gold medal in the mixed team recurve bow with Martine Abaïfouta Hallas Maria at the 2023 African Archery Championships in Nabeul, Tunisia. With that result he automatically qualified for the 2024 Olympic Games.

In July 2024, he was confirmed to be representing Chad at the 2024 Paris Olympics.

In August 2024, he joined Good Neighbors as a global influencer, who supports initiatives to empower children in African countries.

== Personal life ==
He is a resident archer at the World Archery Excellence Centre in Lausanne, Switzerland.

He worked as an electrician.

Olympic Games
Preceded by Bachir Mahamat; Demos Memneloum	Flag bearer for Chad; 2024 Paris with Demos Memneloum	Succeeded by Incumbent
