= Chad at the 2004 Summer Olympics =

- IOC code: CHA
- NOC: Chadian Olympic and Sports Committee

in Athens
- Competitors: 2 in 1 sport
- Flag bearer: Kaltouma Nadjina
- Medals: Gold 0 Silver 0 Bronze 0 Total 0

Summer Olympics appearances (overview)
- 1964; 1968; 1972; 1976–1980; 1984; 1988; 1992; 1996; 2000; 2004; 2008; 2012; 2016; 2020; 2024

Chad competed at the 2004 Summer Olympics in Athens, Greece, from 13 to 29 August 2004. The country's participation at Athens marked its tenth appearance in the Summer Olympics since its debut at the 1964 Summer Games in Tokyo, Japan. The delegation included two track and field athletes: Djikoloum Mobele in the men's 100 metres and Kaltouma Nadjina in the women's 400 metres. Both athletes participated at the Games through wild card places since they did not meet the required standards to qualify. Nadjina progressed past the first round of her competition, but was eliminated in the semi-finals.

== Background ==
Chad participated in ten Summer Olympics between its debut in the 1964 Summer Games in Tokyo, Japan, and the 2004 Summer Olympics in Athens, Greece. The only occasions in that period which they did not attend was at the 1976 Summer Olympics in Montreal, Quebec, Canada, and the 1980 Summer Olympics in Moscow, Soviet Union. On both occasions, it was because they had joined with international boycotts of the events. The first boycott was because of the inclusion of the New Zealand team at the Games despite the breach of the international sports boycott of South Africa by the nation's rugby union team shortly prior. In 1980, Chad joined with the United States led boycott over the 1979 invasion of Afghanistan during the Soviet–Afghan War.

As of 2004, the highest number of Chadians participating at any one Games was six at both the 1988 Summer Games in Seoul, South Korea, and at the 1992 Summer Olympics in Barcelona, Spain. Nor had any Chadian ever won a medal at an Olympics.

The Chadian team for the 2004 Athens Games featured sprinter Kaltouma Nadjina in the women's 400 metres, who had previously competed for the nation at the 2000 Summer Olympics in Sydney, Australia. Nadjina had trained in the United States and Canada, under an International Olympic Committee scholarship. But after refusing to move from Canada to Senegal following the 2000 Games, she lost her funding, and lived in a spare room of her coach John Cannon's house in Vancouver. Prior to the 2004 Games, she had considered switching her allegiance from Chad to Canada.

== Athletics ==
Chad was represented by one male athlete at the 2004 Games in athletics – Djikoloum Mobele in the 100 metres. He qualified for the 2004 Games through the use of a wildcard, since his season best time of 11.38 seconds for the 100 metres fell outside of the "B" qualifying standard of 10.28 seconds. He had been due to compete in the seventh heat, taking place on 21 August, however Mobele did not start the race.

The country's sole female athlete at the 2004 Games was Kaltouma Nadjina in the 400 metres. Her season best time of 50.80 seconds fell within the "A" qualifying time of 51.50 seconds. At her previous appearance at the Olympics, she reached the semi-finals of the 400 metres. Her first run of the Games took place in the second heat on 21 August. She placed third out of the seven athletes, with a time of 51.50 seconds, behind Monique Hennagan of the United States (51.02 seconds) and Bulgaria's Mariyana Dimitrova (51.29 seconds). Nadkina's third-place finish qualified her for the semi-finals. The following round took place on the following day, with Nadkina competing in the second of the three heats. She finished in fifth place with a time of 51.57 seconds, failing to qualify for the final. The heat was won by Bahamas' Tonique Williams-Darling, with a time 1.57 seconds ahead of Nadkina.

Key

- Note–Ranks given for track events are within the athlete's heat only
- Q = Qualified for the next round
- DNS = Did not start
- N/A = Round not applicable for the event

Track events

Athlete	Event	Heat		Quarterfinal		Semifinal		Final	
Athlete	Event	Result	Rank	Result	Rank	Result	Rank	Result	Rank
Djikoloum Mobele	100 m	DNS		Did not advance					
Kaltouma Nadjina	400 m	51.50	3 Q	—N/a		51.57	5	Did not advance	
