= Athletics at the 2016 Summer Olympics – Women's 5000 metres =

Women's 5000 metres at the Games of the XXXI Olympiad
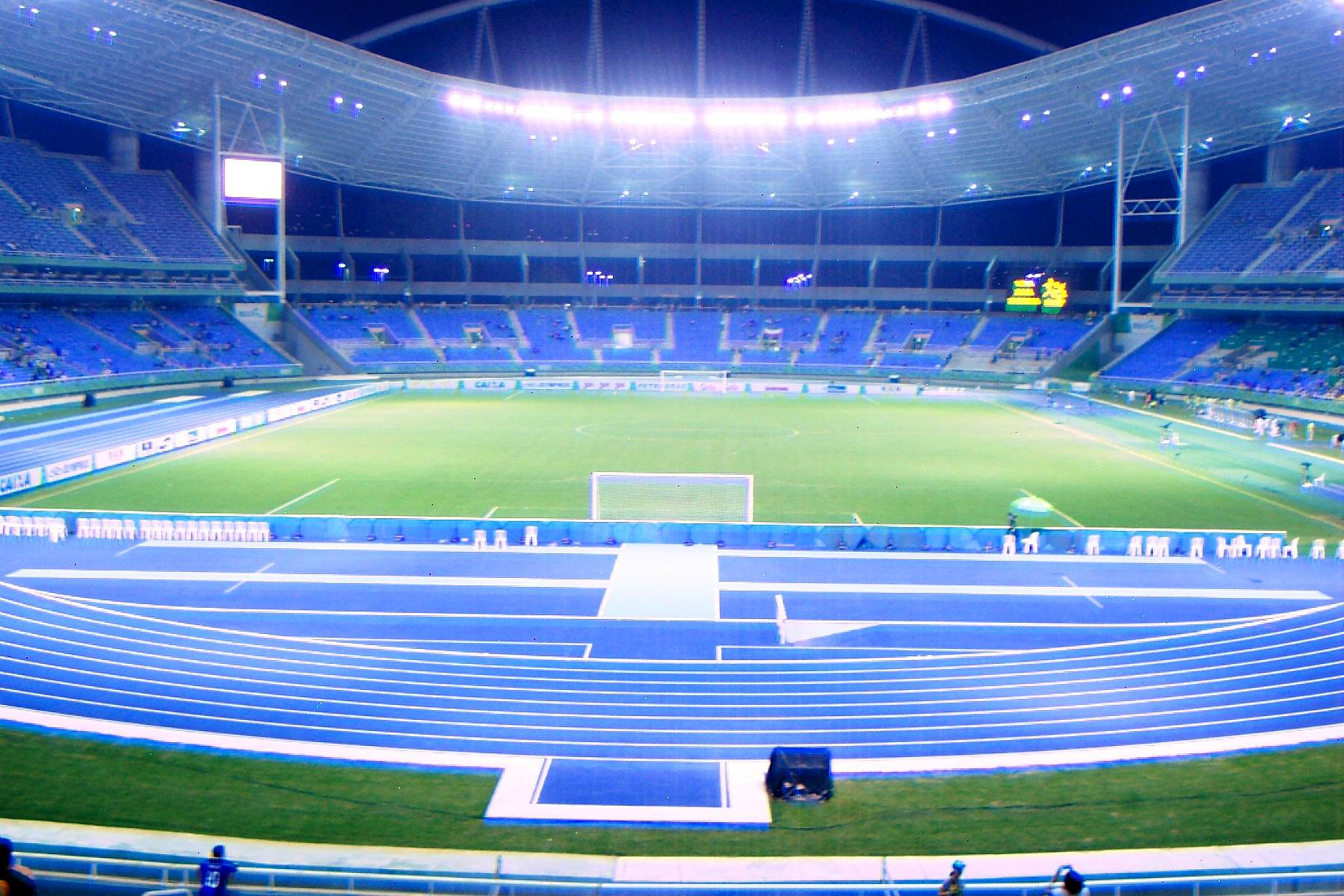
- Interior view of the Estádio Olímpico João Havelange, where the Women's 5000m took place.
- Venue: Olympic Stadium
- Dates: 16 August 2016 (heats); 19 August 2016 (final)
- Winning time: 14:26.17 OR

Medalists
1st place, gold medalist(s)		Vivian Cheruiyot	Kenya
2nd place, silver medalist(s)		Hellen Onsando Obiri	Kenya
3rd place, bronze medalist(s)		Almaz Ayana	Ethiopia

The women's 5000 metres event at the 2016 Summer Olympics took place between 16–19 August at the Olympic Stadium.

== Summary ==
Almaz Ayana came into this race with the number two time in history, run just two and a half months earlier. That race in Rome came within a second and a half of the world record, so expectations were high. Ayana's strategy was well known to these competitors, she had used it to win the World Championships in 2015, the qualification to these Olympics and to win the 10,000 metres at these Olympics. In particular, Vivian Cheruiyot had experienced it first hand in that 10,000, being relegated to silver.

The final started with confusion as the athletes were called to the line three times before the gun was actually fired. Once started Miyuki Uehara went to the front, her move immediately covered by Ayana. The two opened up a 7-metre gap in the first 200 metres of the race. The next lap in 74 seconds was slow and the field, led by four Kenyans reeled in the leaders. Uehara led for 4 and a quarter relatively slow laps, then Ayana executed her strategy, she accelerated. The Kenyans; Cheruiyot, Hellen Onsando Obiri, Mercy Cherono and Yasemin Can running for Turkey rushed to try to cover the move. After 75 second laps, Ayana dropped it to 65 seconds, establishing a 25-metre lead on the pack of Kenyans led by Can and Cheruiyot. Ten other runners in the race were dropped to 60 metres back, with only Senbere Teferi in a no man's land in between groups. Ayana's next two laps were 66 and 68. Can fell off, but the three Kenyans stayed with the pace. The next lap was 69 seconds, but more importantly, unlike her previous races, the gap was not growing. With 1000 metres remaining in the race, Cherono fell off the back but Cheruiyot accelerated with Obiri trying to hold on. The gap was shrinking. Within 300 metres, it disappeared as Cheruiyot went past Ayana. In the next hundred metres, Obiri also went by Ayana. With a lap to go, Cheruiyot had run the 66 second lap and Cheruiyot the 25 metre gap, Ayana was struggling to hold onto any medal at all. Running a 65.59 last lap, Cheruiyot extended the gap to 50 metres, and almost 20 back to Obiri to take gold and leave Obiri silver. Ayana held on to third for the bronze medal. All three were under the previous Olympic record.

The medals were presented by Dagmawit Girmay Berhane, IOC member, Ethiopia and Dahlan Jumaan al-Hamad, Vice President of the IAAF.

== Competition format ==
The women's 5000m competition consisted of heats (Round 1) and a final. The fastest competitors from each race in the heats qualified for the final along with the fastest overall competitors not already qualified that were required to fill the (normally) sixteen spaces in the final. Due to falls in heat 2, eighteen runners contested the final.

== Records ==
Prior to the competition, the existing World and Olympic records were as follows.

World record	Tirunesh Dibaba (ETH)	14:11.15	Oslo, Norway	6 June 2008
Olympic record	Gabriela Szabo (ROU)	14:40.79	Sydney, Australia	25 September 2000
2016 World leading	Almaz Ayana (ETH)	14:12.59	Rome, Italy	2 June 2016

The following record was established during the competition:

Date	Event	Name	Nationality	Time	Record
19 August	Final	Vivian Cheruiyot	Kenya	14:26.17	OR

== Schedule ==
All times are Brasilia Time (UTC-3)

Date	Time	Round
Tuesday, 16 August 2016	9:30	Heats
Friday, 19 August 2016	21:40	Finals

== Results ==
=== Heats ===
==== Heat 1 ====
Rank	Athlete	Nationality	Time	Notes
1	Hellen Onsando Obiri	Kenya	15:19.48	Q
2	Yasemin Can	Turkey	15:19.50	Q
3	Mercy Cherono	Kenya	15:19.56	Q
4	Shelby Houlihan	United States	15:19.76	Q
5	Susan Kuijken	Netherlands	15:19.96	Q, SB
6	Madeline Heiner Hills	Australia	15:21.33	q
7	Miyuki Uehara	Japan	15:23.41	q, SB
8	Ababel Yeshaneh	Ethiopia	15:24.38	q
9	Juliet Chekwel	Uganda	15:29.07	
10	Laura Whittle	Great Britain	15:31.30	
11	Louise Carton	Belgium	15:34.39	
12	Kim Conley	United States	15:34.39	
13	Jessica O'Connell	Canada	15:51.18	
14	Lucy Oliver	New Zealand	15:53.77	
15	Sharon Firisua	Solomon Islands	18:01.62	
16	Beatrice Kamuchanga Alice	Democratic Republic of the Congo	19:29.47	
	Dalila Abdulkadir	Bahrain	DNS	

==== Heat 2 ====
Official Video Highlights

In heat 2, Abbey D'Agostino and Nikki Hamblin collided and fell. D'Agostino was the first to get up but instead of running ahead, she stopped to help Hamblin up. Later in the race, it turned out that D'Agostino's injury was the more serious as she started limping and fell again. This time, Hamblin stopped and encouraged her to get up and finish the race. After the race, organizers decided to reinstate them both as finalists, along with Jennifer Wenth who was also impeded by the collision. Hamblin and D'Agostino were later awarded a Fair Play Award by the International Fair Play Committee for their actions in the heat. Injured, D'Agostino was unable to start the final.

Rank	Name	Nationality	Time	Notes
1	Almaz Ayana	Ethiopia	15:04.35	Q
2	Senbere Teferi	Ethiopia	15:17.43	Q
3	Vivian Cheruiyot	Kenya	15:17.74	Q
4	Karoline Bjerkeli Grøvdal	Norway	15:17.83	Q
5	Eilish McColgan	Great Britain	15:18.20	Q
6	Eloise Wellings	Australia	15:19.02	q, SB
7	Genevieve LaCaze	Australia	15:20.45	q, PB
8	Stephanie Twell	Great Britain	15:25.90	
9	Misaki Onishi	Japan	15:29.17	
10	Mimi Belete	Bahrain	15:29.72	
11	Andrea Seccafien	Canada	15:30.32	
12	Ayuko Suzuki	Japan	15:41.81	
13	Stella Chesang	Uganda	15:49.80	
14	Jennifer Wenth	Austria	16:07.02	q (Note: Post-race, organizers decided to reinstate Nikki Hamblin and Abbey D'Agostino as finalists, along with Jennifer Wenth who was also impeded by the collision.)
15	Nikki Hamblin	New Zealand	16:43.61	q
16	Abbey D'Agostino	United States	17:10.02	q
–	Bibiro Ali Taher	Chad	DNF	

=== Final ===
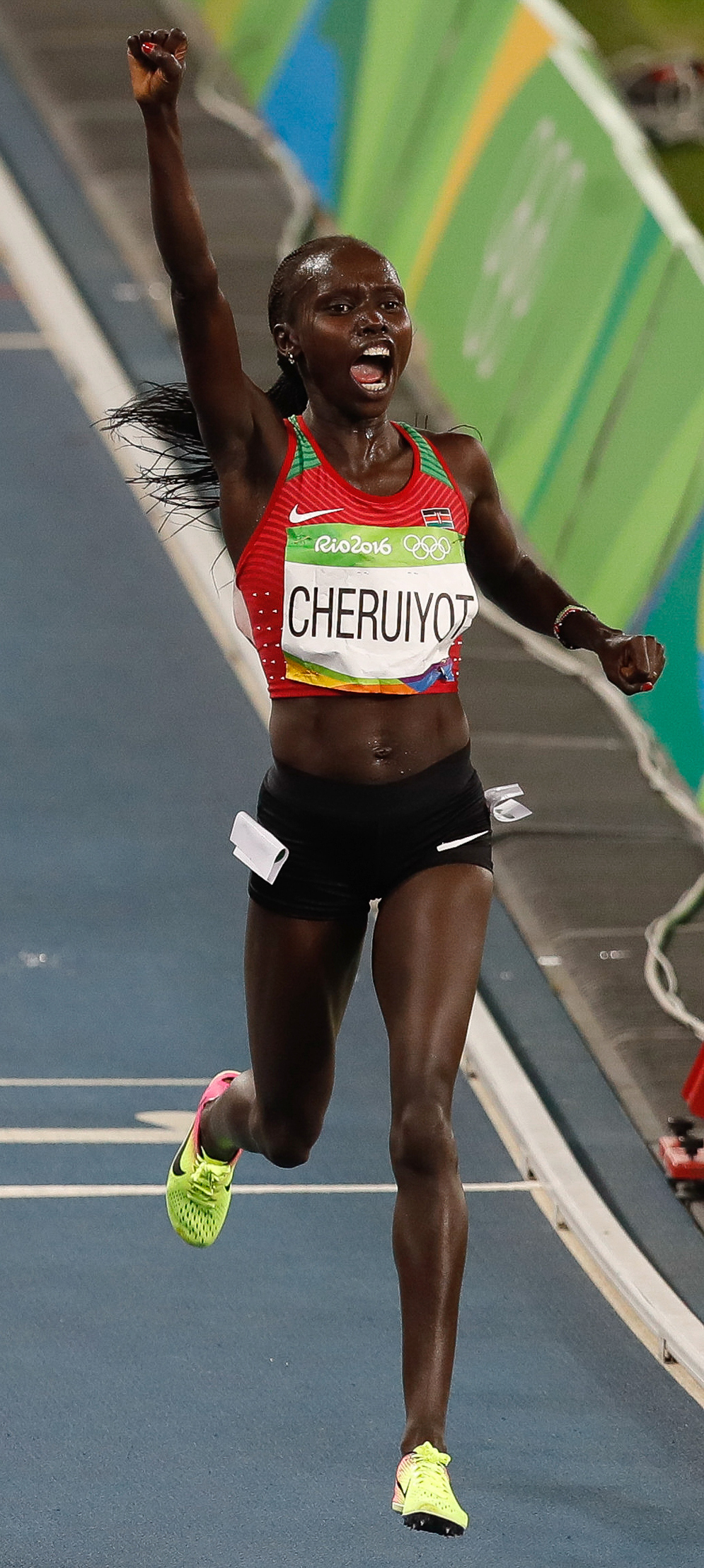
Vivian Cheruiyot celebrates as she finishes

Rank	Name	Nationality	Time	Notes
1st place, gold medalist(s)	Vivian Cheruiyot	Kenya	14:26.17	OR
2nd place, silver medalist(s)	Hellen Onsando Obiri	Kenya	14:29.77	PB
3rd place, bronze medalist(s)	Almaz Ayana	Ethiopia	14:33.59	
4	Mercy Cherono	Kenya	14:42.89	
5	Senbere Teferi	Ethiopia	14:43.75	
6	Yasemin Can	Turkey	14:56.96	
7	Karoline Bjerkeli Grøvdal	Norway	14:57.53	PB
8	Susan Kuijken	Netherlands	15:00.69	PB
9	Eloise Wellings	Australia	15:01.59	SB
10	Madeline Heiner Hills	Australia	15:04.05	PB
11	Shelby Houlihan	United States	15:08.89	
12	Genevieve LaCaze	Australia	15:10.35	PB
13	Eilish McColgan	Great Britain	15:12.09	
14	Ababel Yeshaneh	Ethiopia	15:18.26	
15	Miyuki Uehara	Japan	15:34.97	
16	Jennifer Wenth	Austria	15:56.11	
17	Nikki Hamblin	New Zealand	16:14.24	SB
–	Abbey D'Agostino	United States	DNS	
