= Ali Faudet =

Chadian sprinter

Personal information
- Born: July 3, 1970 (age 56)

Sport
- Sport: Track and field

Ali Faudet (born July 3, 1970) is a track and field sprint athlete who represented Chad at both the 1988 Summer Olympics in Seoul and the 1992 Summer Olympics in Barcelona.

In Seoul, he was one of six athletes competing for Chad. He participated in the 400 metres, achieving a time of 48.69 seconds. This put him sixth in his heat, which did not qualify him for the next round. In Barcelona, Faudet was one of only three athletes competing for Chad. He again competed in the 400 metres, this time achieving a time of 47.10 seconds. Again, he placed sixth in his heat, and again, he did not progress to the next round.
