= Chad at the 1996 Summer Olympics =

- IOC code: CHA
- NOC: Chadian Olympic and Sports Committee

in Atlanta
- Competitors: 4 in 1 sport
- Flag bearer: Kaltouma Nadjina
- Medals: Gold 0 Silver 0 Bronze 0 Total 0

Summer Olympics appearances (overview)
- 1964; 1968; 1972; 1976–1980; 1984; 1988; 1992; 1996; 2000; 2004; 2008; 2012; 2016; 2020; 2024

Chad competed at the 1996 Summer Olympics in Atlanta, United States.

== Competitors ==
The following is the list of number of competitors in the Games.

| Sport | Men | Women | Total |
|---|---|---|---|
| Athletics | 3 | 1 | 4 |
| Total | 3 | 1 | 4 |

== Results by event ==
=== Athletics ===
==== Men ====
Track and road events

| Athletes | Events | Heat Round 1 | | Heat Round 2 | | Semifinal | | Final | |
| Athletes | Events | Time | Rank | Time | Rank | Time | Rank | Time | Rank |
|---|---|---|---|---|---|---|---|---|---|
| Brahim Abdoulaye | 200 metres | 21.67 | 69 | did not advance | | | | | |
| Kimitene Biyago | 400 metres | 48.88 | 54 | did not advance | | | | | |
| Terap Adoum Yaya | 800 metres | 1:52.68 | 50 | N/A | | did not advance | | | |

==== Women ====
Track and road events

| Athletes | Events | Heat Round 1 | | Heat Round 2 | | Semifinal | | Final | |
| Athletes | Events | Time | Rank | Time | Rank | Time | Rank | Time | Rank |
|---|---|---|---|---|---|---|---|---|---|
| Kaltouma Nadjina | 200 metres | 24.47 | 42 | did not advance | | | | | |

== Notes and references ==
- Official Olympic Reports
