= Chad at the 1964 Summer Olympics =

- IOC code: CHA (CHD used at these Games)
- NOC: Chadian Olympic and Sports Committee

in Tokyo
- Competitors: 2 in 1 sport
- Medals: Gold 0 Silver 0 Bronze 0 Total 0

Summer Olympics appearances (overview)
- 1964; 1968; 1972; 1976–1980; 1984; 1988; 1992; 1996; 2000; 2004; 2008; 2012; 2016; 2020; 2024

Chad competed at the Summer Olympic Games for the first time at the 1964 Summer Olympics in Tokyo, Japan. It was invited by the Olympic Committee on May 1, that gave provisional recognition to the National Olympic Committee of Chad. The Chadian team arrived on June 19.

== Athletics ==
Key

- Note–Ranks given for track events are within the athlete's heat only
- Q = Qualified for the next round
- q = Qualified for the next round as a fastest loser or, in field events, by position without achieving the qualifying target
- NR = National record
- N/A = Round not applicable for the event
- Bye = Athlete not required to compete in round

Men
Track

Athlete	Event	Heat		Semifinal		Final	
Athlete	Event	Result	Rank	Result	Rank	Result	Rank
Ahmed Issa	800 m	1:49.7	2 Q	1:49.4	5	did not advance	

Field events

Athlete	Event	Qualification		Final	
Athlete	Event	Distance	Position	Distance	Position
Mahamat Idriss	High jump	2.06	3T Q	2.09	9
