= Chad at the 1988 Summer Olympics =

- IOC code: CHA
- NOC: Chadian Olympic and Sports Committee

in Seoul
- Competitors: 6 in 1 sport
- Flag bearer: Paul Ngadjadoum
- Medals: Gold 0 Silver 0 Bronze 0 Total 0

Summer Olympics appearances (overview)
- 1964; 1968; 1972; 1976–1980; 1984; 1988; 1992; 1996; 2000; 2004; 2008; 2012; 2016; 2020; 2024

Chad competed at the 1988 Summer Olympics in Seoul, South Korea.

== Competitors ==
The following is the list of number of competitors in the Games.

Sport	Men	Women	Total
Athletics	6	0	6
Total	6	0	6

== Athletics ==
Key

- Note–Ranks given for track events are within the athlete's heat only
- Q = Qualified for the next round
- q = Qualified for the next round as a fastest loser or, in field events, by position without achieving the qualifying target
- NR = National record
- N/A = Round not applicable for the event
- Bye = Athlete not required to compete in round

Men

Athlete	Event	Heat		Quarterfinal		Semifinal		Final	
Athlete	Event	Result	Rank	Result	Rank	Result	Rank	Result	Rank
Ali Faudet	400 m	48.69	6	did not advance					
Yussuf Moli Yesky	800 m	1:57.97	8	did not advance					
Seid Gayaplé	1500 m	3:58.46	14	n/a		did not advance			
Ronodji Niakaken	5000 m	15:42.73	19	n/a		did not advance			
Ismael Yaya	10000 m	30:47.29	19	n/a				did not advance	

Field events

Athlete	Event	Qualification		Final	
Athlete	Event	Distance	Position	Distance	Position
Paul Ngadjadoum	High jump	2.15	25	did not advance	
