= Eugene Farrell =

Irish sprinter

Personal information
- Nationality: Irish
- Born: 21 April 1973 (age 53) Dublin

Sport
- Sport: Sprinting
- Event: 400 metres

Eugene Farrell (born 21 April 1973) is an Irish sprinter. He competed in the men's 400 metres at the 1996 Summer Olympics.

He competed for Dublin City Harriers athletics club.
