= Amal Adam =

Egyptian archer (born 1981)

Personal information
- Nationality: Egyptian
- Born: 24 December 1981 (age 44)

Sport
- Sport: Archery
Medal record
Women's recurve archery
Representing Egypt
African Games
Gold medal – first place	2019 Rabat	Team
Bronze medal – third place	2019 Rabat	Individual

Amal Adam (born 24 December 1981) is an Egyptian archer. She won the bronze medal in the women's recurve event at the 2019 African Games held in Rabat, Morocco. She also won the gold medal in the women's team recurve event. She competed in the women's individual event at the 2020 Summer Olympics.
