= Carine Ngarlemdana =

Chadian judoka

Personal information
- Nationality: Chadian
- Born: November 13, 1994 (age 30)

Sport
- Country: Chad
- Sport: Judo
- Weight class: 70 kilograms (150 lb)
- Updated on 4 November 2016

Carine Ngarlemdana (born 13 November 1994) is a Chadian judoka. She competed at the 2012 Summer Olympics in the Women's -70 kg event. She was the flag bearer for Chad at the opening ceremony.

== Early life ==
Carine Ngarlemdana was born in N'Djamena, Chad, on 13 November 1994. She was the youngest of four children, and went on to attend Heredity High School in the city. Her father was a physical education teacher, and began to coach Ngarlemdana as she took up judo from the age of five.

== Judo career ==
At the age of 12, she won a bronze medal at a national competition held in N'Djamena.

She began to prepare for the 2012 Summer Olympics in London, United Kingdom, by travelling to the International Center of African Judo in Algiers, Algeria, to train from March 2011 onwards for the following 20 months on a scholarship. She was one of three members named to the Chadian team, alongside Hinikissia Albertine Ndikert and Haroun Abderrahim. However, Abderrahim did not make the team eventually, meaning that Ngarlemdana formed half of the team representing Chad, which was one of only two all female teams at the 2012 Games. Ngarlemdana was selected to be the flag bearer at the Parade of Nations at the opening ceremony.

She competed in the Women's -70 kg tournament at the Games, facing British judoka Sally Conway in the first round. Ngarlemdana lost the bout by an ippon score after being hit with a wazaari by Conway.

Ngarlemna was the winner of a club level international tournament held in Cergy, Paris, France in 2016. This was after having moved to Paris for six months.

Olympic Games
Preceded by Hinikissia Albertine Ndikert	Flagbearer for Chad; London 2012	Succeeded by Bibiro Ali Taher
