= Chad at the 1992 Summer Olympics =

- IOC code: CHA
- NOC: Chadian Olympic and Sports Committee

in Barcelona
- Competitors: 6 in 2 sports
- Medals: Gold 0 Silver 0 Bronze 0 Total 0

Summer Olympics appearances (overview)
- 1964; 1968; 1972; 1976–1980; 1984; 1988; 1992; 1996; 2000; 2004; 2008; 2012; 2016; 2020; 2024

Chad competed at the 1992 Summer Olympics in Barcelona, Spain.

== Competitors ==
The following is the list of number of competitors in the Games.

Sport	Men	Women	Total
Athletics	3	1	4
Judo	2	0	2
Total	5	1	6

== Athletics ==
Key

- Note–Ranks given for track events are within the athlete's heat only
- Q = Qualified for the next round
- q = Qualified for the next round as a fastest loser or, in field events, by position without achieving the qualifying target
- NR = National record
- N/A = Round not applicable for the event
- Bye = Athlete not required to compete in round

Men
Track

Athlete	Event	Heat		Quarterfinal		Semifinal		Final	
Athlete	Event	Result	Rank	Result	Rank	Result	Rank	Result	Rank
Ali Faudet	400 m	47.10	6	did not advance					
Terap Adoum Yaya	800 m	1:54.43	6	n/a		did not advance			
Yussuf Moli Yesky	5000 m	15:29.25	14	n/a				did not advance	

Women
Track

Athlete	Event	Heat		Semifinal		Final	
Athlete	Event	Result	Rank	Result	Rank	Result	Rank
Rosalie Gangué	800 m	DQ		did not advance			
Rosalie Gangué	1500 m	5:06.31	10	did not advance			

== Judo ==
Men

Athlete	Event	Round of 64	Round of 32	Round of 16	Quarterfinals	Semifinals	Repechage	Final / BM	
Athlete	Event	Opposition Result	Opposition Result	Opposition Result	Opposition Result	Opposition Result	Opposition Result	Opposition Result	Rank
Sakor Rodet	−65 kg	Steffano (URU); L	did not advance						36
M'Bairo Abakar	−78 kg	Bye	Morris (USA); L	did not advance					13

== Sources ==
- Official Olympic Reports
