= Beatrice Kamuchanga Alice =

Congolese long-distance runner

Beatrice Kamuchanga Alice (born November 20, 1997) is a long-distance runner from the Democratic Republic of the Congo. She competed at the 2016 Summer Olympics in the women's 5000 metres race; her time of 19:29.47 in the heats did not qualify her for the final.
