= Athletics at the 1996 Summer Olympics – Men's 400 metres =

Men's 400 metres at the Games of the XXVI Olympiad
- Venue: Centennial Olympic Stadium
- Dates: 26 July 1996 (heats); 27 July 1996 (quarter-finals); 28 July 1996 (semi-finals); 29 July 1996 (final)
- Competitors: 62 from 42 nations
- Winning time: 43.49 OR

Medalists
1st place, gold medalist(s)		Michael Johnson; United States
2nd place, silver medalist(s)		Roger Black; Great Britain
3rd place, bronze medalist(s)		Davis Kamoga; Uganda

Official Video Highlights @ 1:50

The men's 400 metres event at the 1996 Summer Olympics in Atlanta, Georgia took place between 26 and 29 July. There were 62 competitors from 42 countries. The maximum number of athletes per nation had been set at 3 since the 1930 Olympic Congress.

The event was won by Michael Johnson of the United States. A few days later, Johnson would become the only man to win both the 400 metres and the 200 metres in the same Olympics. Johnson's 400 metres victory in Atlanta was the first of his two wins; he would become the only man to repeat as gold medalist in the event when he won again in 2000. More generally, his win was the fourth in what would ultimately be 7 consecutive American victories stretching from 1984 to 2008 and the 16th overall title in the event by the United States. Roger Black's silver medal was Great Britain's first in the event since 1936; Davis Kamoga's bronze was Uganda's first in the event ever.

== Background ==
This was the 23rd appearance of the event, which is one of 12 athletics events to have been held at every Summer Olympics. The only two finalists from 1992 to return were bronze medalist Samson Kitur of Kenya and seventh-place finisher Ibrahim Ismail Muftah of Qatar. Michael Johnson of the United States was the clear favorite, having won the last two world championships. His countryman Butch Reynolds had come in second both times, as well as having won silver in the 1988 Olympics. Roger Black of Great Britain, 1991 world championship runner-up, 1986 and 1990 European champion, and 1994 European runner-up, was probably the strongest non-American challenger.

Algeria, Comoros, Cyprus, Saint Lucia, Slovakia, Sri Lanka, and Yemen appeared in this event for the first time. The United States made its 22nd appearance, most of any nation, having missed only the boycotted 1980 Games.

== Competition format ==
The competition retained the basic four-round format from 1920. The "fastest loser" system, introduced in 1964, was used for the first round. There were 8 first-round heats, each with 7 or 8 runners. The top three runners in each heat advanced, along with the next eight fastest overall (in contrast to previous instances where there were 8 heats, which used a top-four with no-fastest-loser rule). The 32 quarterfinalists were divided into 4 quarterfinals with 8 runners each; the top four athletes in each quarterfinal heat advanced to the semifinals, with no "fastest loser" spots. The semifinals featured 2 heats of 8 runners each. The top four runners in each semifinal heat advanced, making an eight-man final.

== Records ==
These were the standing world and Olympic records (in seconds) prior to the 1996 Summer Olympics.

World record	Butch Reynolds (USA)	43.29	Zürich, Switzerland	17 August 1988
Olympic record	Quincy Watts (USA)	43.50	Barcelona, Spain	5 August 1992

In the final Michael Johnson set a new Olympic record by 0.01 seconds with 43.49 seconds.

== Schedule ==
Following the 1984 schedule, the event was held on four separate days, with each round being on a different day.

All times are Eastern Daylight Time (UTC-4)

Date	Time	Round
Friday, 26 July 1996	19:00	Round 1
Saturday, 27 July 1996	19:55	Quarterfinals
Sunday, 28 July 1996	20:26	Semifinals
Monday, 29 July 1996	21:10	Final

== Results ==
=== Round 1 ===
==== Heat 1 ====
Rank	Lane	Athlete	Nation	Time	Notes
1	3	Roger Black	Great Britain	45.28	Q
2	2	Neil de Silva	Trinidad and Tobago	45.34	Q
3	1	Štefan Balošák	Slovakia	45.86	Q
4	6	Jude Monye	Nigeria	46.10	q
5	7	Michael Joubert	Australia	46.30	
6	5	Kossi Akoto	Togo	46.94	
—	8	Moustafa Abdel Naser	Libya	DSQ	
—	4	Amar Hecini	Algeria	DSQ	

==== Heat 2 ====
Rank	Lane	Athlete	Nation	Time	Notes
1	5	Davian Clarke	Jamaica	45.54	Q
2	7	Sanderlei Parrela	Brazil	45.60	Q
3	1	Troy Douglas	Bermuda	45.61	Q
4	6	Charles Gitonga	Kenya	45.62	q
5	2	Piotr Rysiukiewicz	Poland	46.07	q
6	3	Mohamed Hamed Al-Bishi	Saudi Arabia	46.82	
7	8	Ivan Jean-Marie	Saint Lucia	47.13	
8	4	Hassan Abdou	Comoros	50.17	

==== Heat 3 ====
Rank	Lane	Athlete	Nation	Time	Notes
1	6	Alvin Harrison	United States	44.69	Q
2	5	Ibrahim Ismail Muftah	Qatar	45.61	Q
3	2	Paul Greene	Australia	46.12	Q
4	8	Shigekazu Omori	Japan	46.30	
5	3	Laurent Clerc	Switzerland	46.42	
6	4	Shon Ju-Il	South Korea	46.74	
7	7	Subul Babo	Papua New Guinea	48.15	
—	1	Justice Dipeba	Botswana	DNS	

==== Heat 4 ====
Rank	Lane	Athlete	Nation	Time	Notes
1	6	Eswort Coombs	Saint Vincent and the Grenadines	45.84	Q
2	5	Jean-Louis Rapnouil	France	45.93	Q
3	3	Du'aine Ladejo	Great Britain	46.27	Q
4	2	Troy McIntosh	Bahamas	46.42	
5	7	Valdinei da Silva	Brazil	46.61	
6	1	Richard Jones	Guyana	46.99	
7	4	Mpho Morobe	Lesotho	47.54	
8	8	Mohamed Amir	Maldives	49.67	

==== Heat 5 ====
Rank	Lane	Athlete	Nation	Time	Notes
1	8	Sugath Thilakaratne	Sri Lanka	45.79	Q
2	3	Michael Johnson	United States	45.80	Q
3	6	Alejandro Cárdenas	Mexico	45.85	Q
4	1	Bobang Phiri	South Africa	45.94	q
5	5	Kennedy Ochieng	Kenya	45.99	q
6	2	Euripidis Dimosthenous	Cyprus	46.76	
7	4	Emmanuel Rubayiza	Rwanda	49.20	
—	7	Francis Ogola	Uganda	DNF	

==== Heat 6 ====
Rank	Lane	Athlete	Nation	Time	Notes
1	7	Butch Reynolds	United States	45.42	Q
2	3	Arnaud Malherbe	South Africa	45.75	Q
3	6	Tawanda Chiwira	Zimbabwe	45.89	Q
4	5	Mathias Rusterholz	Switzerland	45.92	q
5	1	Dawda Jallow	The Gambia	46.73	
6	4	Eugene Farrell	Ireland	47.18	
7	2	Casimiro Asumu Nze	Equatorial Guinea	50.14	
—	8	Ibrahim Hassan	Ghana	DNF	

==== Heat 7 ====
Rank	Lane	Athlete	Nation	Time	Notes
1	1	Clement Chukwu	Nigeria	45.18	Q
2	8	Samson Kitur	Kenya	45.39	Q
3	5	Michael McDonald	Jamaica	45.50	Q
4	6	Hendrick Mokganyetsi	South Africa	45.89	q
5	4	Osmar dos Santos	Brazil	46.16	
6	2	Robert Guy	Trinidad and Tobago	46.80	
7	7	Martial Biguet	Central African Republic	48.92	
8	3	Anwar Mohamed Ali	Yemen	50.81	

==== Heat 8 ====
Rank	Lane	Athlete	Nation	Time	Notes
1	2	Sunday Bada	Nigeria	45.19	Q
2	7	Iwan Thomas	Great Britain	45.22	Q
3	1	Davis Kamoga	Uganda	45.56	Q
4	5	Roxbert Martin	Jamaica	46.01	q
5	8	Mark Ladbrook	Australia	46.28	
6	6	Carl Oliver	Bahamas	47.41	
7	3	Kimitene Biyago	Chad	48.88	
—	4	Ibrahim Ouédraogo	Burkina Faso	DNS	

==== Eliminated in heats ====
Ranks are unofficial.

Rank	Athlete	Nation	Time
33	Osmar dos Santos	Brazil	46.16
34	Mark Ladbrook	Australia	46.28
35	Michael Joubert	Australia	46.30
35	Shigekazu Omori	Japan	46.30
37	Troy McIntosh	Bahamas	46.42
37	Laurent Clerc	Switzerland	46.42
39	Valdinei da Silva	Brazil	46.61
40	Richard Jones	Guyana	46.69
41	Dawda Jallow	The Gambia	46.73
42	Shon Ju-Il	South Korea	46.74
43	Evripides Demosthenous	Cyprus	46.76
44	Robert Guy	Trinidad and Tobago	46.80
45	Mohamed Hamed Al-Bishi	Saudi Arabia	46.82
46	Kossi Akoto	Togo	46.94
47	Ivan Jean-Marie	Saint Lucia	47.13
48	Eugene Farrell	Ireland	47.18
49	Carl Oliver	Bahamas	47.41
50	Mpho Morobe	Lesotho	47.54
51	Subul Babo	Papua New Guinea	48.15
52	Kimitene Biyago	Chad	48.88
53	Martial Biguet	Central African Republic	48.92
54	Emmanuel Rubayiza	Rwanda	49.20
55	Mohamed Amir	Maldives	49.67
56	Casimiro Asumu Nze	Equatorial Guinea	50.14
57	Hassan Abdou	Comoros	50.17
58	Anwar Mohamed Ali	Yemen	50.81
—	Ibrahim Hassan	Ghana	DNF
—	Francis Ogola	Uganda	DNF
—	Moustafa Abdel Naser	Libya	DSQ
—	Amar Hecini	Algeria	DSQ
—	Ibrahim Ouédraogo	Burkina Faso	DNS
—	Justice Dipeba	Botswana	DNS

=== Quarterfinals ===
The quarterfinals were held on 27 July 1996. The top four in each heat advanced to the semifinals.

==== Quarterfinal 1 ====
Rank	Lane	Athlete	Nation	Time	Notes
1	3	Sunday Bada	Nigeria	44.88	Q
2	4	Davian Clarke	Jamaica	44.98	Q
3	6	Samson Kitur	Kenya	45.03	Q
4	2	Troy Douglas	Bermuda	45.26	Q
5	5	Arnaud Malherbe	South Africa	45.26	
6	7	Tawanda Chiwira	Zimbabwe	45.38	
7	8	Mathias Rusterholz	Switzerland	45.72	
8	1	Piotr Rysiukiewicz	Poland	46.19	

==== Quarterfinal 2 ====
Rank	Lane	Athlete	Nation	Time	Notes
1	3	Roger Black	Great Britain	44.72	Q
2	4	Ibrahim Ismail Muftah	Qatar	44.96	Q
3	5	Butch Reynolds	United States	45.21	Q
4	8	Štefan Balošák	Slovakia	45.32	Q
5	7	Alejandro Cárdenas	Mexico	45.33	
6	1	Bobang Phiri	South Africa	45.51	
7	6	Sanderlei Parrela	Brazil	45.72	
8	2	Kennedy Ochieng	Kenya	45.72	

==== Quarterfinal 3 ====
Rank	Lane	Athlete	Nation	Time	Notes
1	6	Michael Johnson	United States	44.62	Q
2	7	Roxbert Martin	Jamaica	44.74	Q
3	8	Davis Kamoga	Uganda	44.82	Q
4	4	Neil de Silva	Trinidad and Tobago	45.02	Q
5	3	Clement Chukwu	Nigeria	45.24	
6	2	Du'aine Ladejo	Great Britain	45.62	
7	5	Sugath Thilakaratne	Sri Lanka	45.78	
8	1	Paul Greene	Australia	46.22	

==== Quarterfinal 4 ====
Rank	Lane	Athlete	Nation	Time	Notes
1	4	Alvin Harrison	United States	44.79	Q
2	6	Iwan Thomas	Great Britain	45.04	Q
3	7	Michael McDonald	Jamaica	45.26	Q
4	5	Eswort Coombs	Saint Vincent and the Grenadines	45.43	Q
5	3	Jean-Louis Rapnouil	France	45.74	
6	1	Hendrick Mokganyetsi	South Africa	46.48	
—	2	Jude Monye	Nigeria	DNF	
—	8	Charles Gitonga	Kenya	DNS	

==== Eliminated in quarterfinals ====
Ranks are unofficial.

Rank	Athlete	Nation	Time
17	Clement Chukwu	Nigeria	45.24
18	Arnaud Malherbe	South Africa	45.26
19	Alejandro Cardenas	Mexico	45.33
20	Tawanda Chiwira	Zimbabwe	45.38
21	Bobang Phiri	South Africa	45.51
22	Du'aine Ladejo	Great Britain	45.62
23	Sanderlei Parrela	Brazil	45.72
24	Mathias Rusterholz	Switzerland	45.72
25	Kennedy Ochieng	Kenya	45.72
26	Jean-Louis Rapnouil	France	45.74
27	Sugath Thilakaratne	Sri Lanka	45.78
28	Piotr Rysiukiewicz	Poland	46.19
29	Paul Greene	Australia	46.22
30	Hendrik Mokganyetsi	South Africa	46.48
31	Jude Monye	Nigeria	DNF
32	Charles Gitonga	Kenya	DNS

=== Semifinals ===
The semifinals were held on 28 July 1996. The top four in each heat advanced to the final.

==== Semifinal 1 ====
Rank	Lane	Athlete	Nation	Time	Notes
1	4	Roger Black	Great Britain	44.69	Q
2	3	Davian Clarke	Jamaica	44.87	Q
3	6	Ibrahim Ismail Muftah	Qatar	45.02	Q
4	5	Alvin Harrison	United States	45.04	Q
5	2	Samson Kitur	Kenya	45.17	
6	7	Štefan Balošák	Slovakia	45.59	
7	8	Troy Douglas	Bermuda	46.33	
—	1	Butch Reynolds	United States	DNF	

==== Semifinal 2 ====
Rank	Lane	Athlete	Nation	Time	Notes
1	5	Michael Johnson	United States	44.59	Q
2	6	Roxbert Martin	Jamaica	44.81	Q
3	1	Davis Kamoga	Uganda	44.85	Q
4	3	Iwan Thomas	Great Britain	45.01	Q
5	4	Sunday Bada	Nigeria	45.30	
6	8	Eswort Coombs	Saint Vincent and the Grenadines	45.36	
7	2	Michael McDonald	Jamaica	45.48	
8	7	Neil de Silva	Trinidad and Tobago	45.56	

==== Eliminated in semifinals ====
Ranks are unofficial.

Rank	Athlete	Nation	Time
9	Samson Kitur	Kenya	45.17
10	Sunday Bada	Nigeria	45.30
11	Eswort Coombs	Saint Vincent and the Grenadines	45.36
12	Michael McDonald	Jamaica	45.48
13	Neil de Silva	Trinidad and Tobago	45.56
14	Štefan Balošák	Slovakia	45.59
15	Troy Douglas	Bermuda	46.33
16	Butch Reynolds	United States	DNF

=== Final ===
The final was held on 29 July 1996.

Rank	Lane	Athlete	Nation	Time	Notes
1st place, gold medalist(s)	4	Michael Johnson	United States	43.49	OR
2nd place, silver medalist(s)	3	Roger Black	Great Britain	44.41	
3rd place, bronze medalist(s)	2	Davis Kamoga	Uganda	44.53	
4	1	Alvin Harrison	United States	44.62	
5	8	Iwan Thomas	Great Britain	44.70	
6	5	Roxbert Martin	Jamaica	44.83	
7	6	Davian Clarke	Jamaica	44.99	
—	7	Ibrahim Ismail Muftah	Qatar	DNF	

== See also ==
Women's 400 metres
