= Bibiro Ali Taher =

Chadian long-distance runner

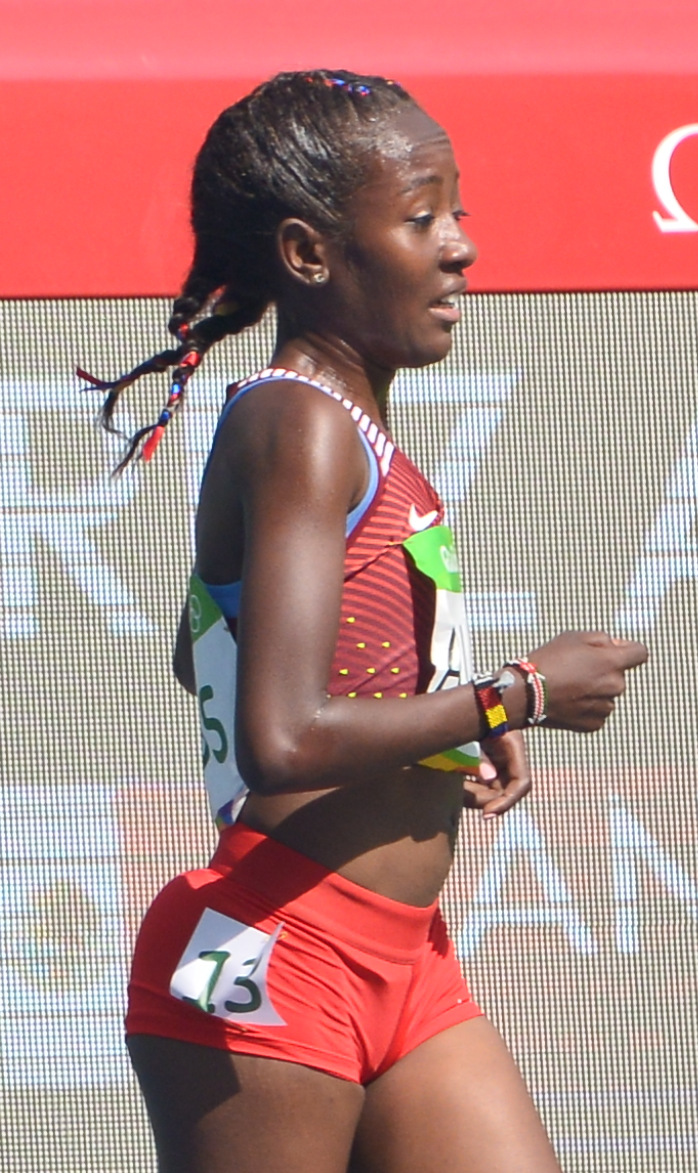
- Ali Taher at the 2016 Olympics

Personal information
- Nationality: Chadian
- Born: 24 April 1988 (age 38)
- Height: 160 cm (5 ft 3 in)
- Weight: 44 kg (97 lb)

Sport
- Country: Chad
- Sport: Athletics
- Events: 3000 m, 5000 m

Achievements and titles
- Personal bests: 3000 m – 11:04.2 (2013); 5000 m – 17:32.71 (2016)

Bibiro Ali Taher (born 24 April 1988) is a Chadian long-distance runner. She moved from Chad to France at age five and took up athletics at age seven in Calvados, France. She competed at the 2016 Summer Olympics in the 5000 metres but did not finish her race. She was the flag bearer for Chad at the Parade of Nations.

== Early life ==
Bibiro Ali Taher moved with her parents from Chad to Hérouville-Saint-Clair, Normandy, France, when she was aged seven. When she was 20, she began to pursue athletics, first at a college in Saint-Michel and then moved to Sotteville-lès-Rouen where she was offered a sports scholarship. While pursuing her athletics career, Taher became a stewardess for Air France.

== Athletic career ==
This attracted the attention of the Chadian sporting officials, who arranged for Taher to visit training facilities in Kenya once a year for the following six years. This meant that she could train alongside the Kenyan middle-distance runners.

Taher was the flag bearer for the Chadian team at the 2016 Games, with the team consisting of her and Bachir Mahamat. She took part in the 5000 metres on 16 August in the second heat. A mistake meant that she did not complete her race; Taher passed the line on her second to last lap and heard the bell indicating the final lap for the athletes a whole lap ahead. She mistakenly thought the bell indicated that it was her final lap, and so pulled up after another 400 metres. As such, she did not finish her race. She later said in an interview, "I gave everything I could. I worked like crazy these past twelve months. I have no regrets, but I had tears in my eyes because I wanted to leave Rio with a new record."

Olympic Games
Preceded by Carine Ngarlemdana	Flagbearer for Chad; 2016 Rio de Janeiro	Succeeded by Demos Memneloum; Bachir Mahamat
