= Anwar Mohamed Ali =

Yemeni track & field sprint athlete (born 1971)

Personal information
- Born: 25 June 1971 (age 55)
- Height: 1.70 m (5 ft 7 in)
- Weight: 58 kg (128 lb)

Sport
- Country: Yemen
- Sport: Athletics

Anwar Mohamed Ali (born 25 June 1971) is a Yemeni track and field sprint athlete who competed internationally for Yemen at the 1996 Summer Olympics.

== Career ==
Ali competed in the 400 metres at the 1996 Summer Olympics held in Atlanta, Georgia, United States, he completed his heat in 50.81 seconds and finished eighth in his heat so didn't qualify for the next round.
