= Hinikissia Albertine Ndikert =

Chadian sprinter

Personal information
- Born: September 15, 1992 (age 33)
- Height: 1.65 m (5 ft 5 in)
- Weight: 60 kg (132 lb)

Sport
- Country: Chad
- Sport: Athletics
- Event: 200 metres
- Updated on 22 July 2012

Hinikissia Albertine Ndikert (born 15 September 1992) is a track and field sprint athlete who competes internationally for Chad.

Ndikert represented Chad at the 2008 Summer Olympics in Beijing. She competed at the 100 metres sprint and placed seventh in her heat without advancing to the second round. She ran the distance in a time of 12.55 seconds.

Olympic Games
| Preceded by Brahim Abdoulaye | Flagbearer for Chad; 2008 Beijing | Succeeded by Carine Ngarlemdana |
