= Youssof Tolba =

Egyptian archer (born 2001)

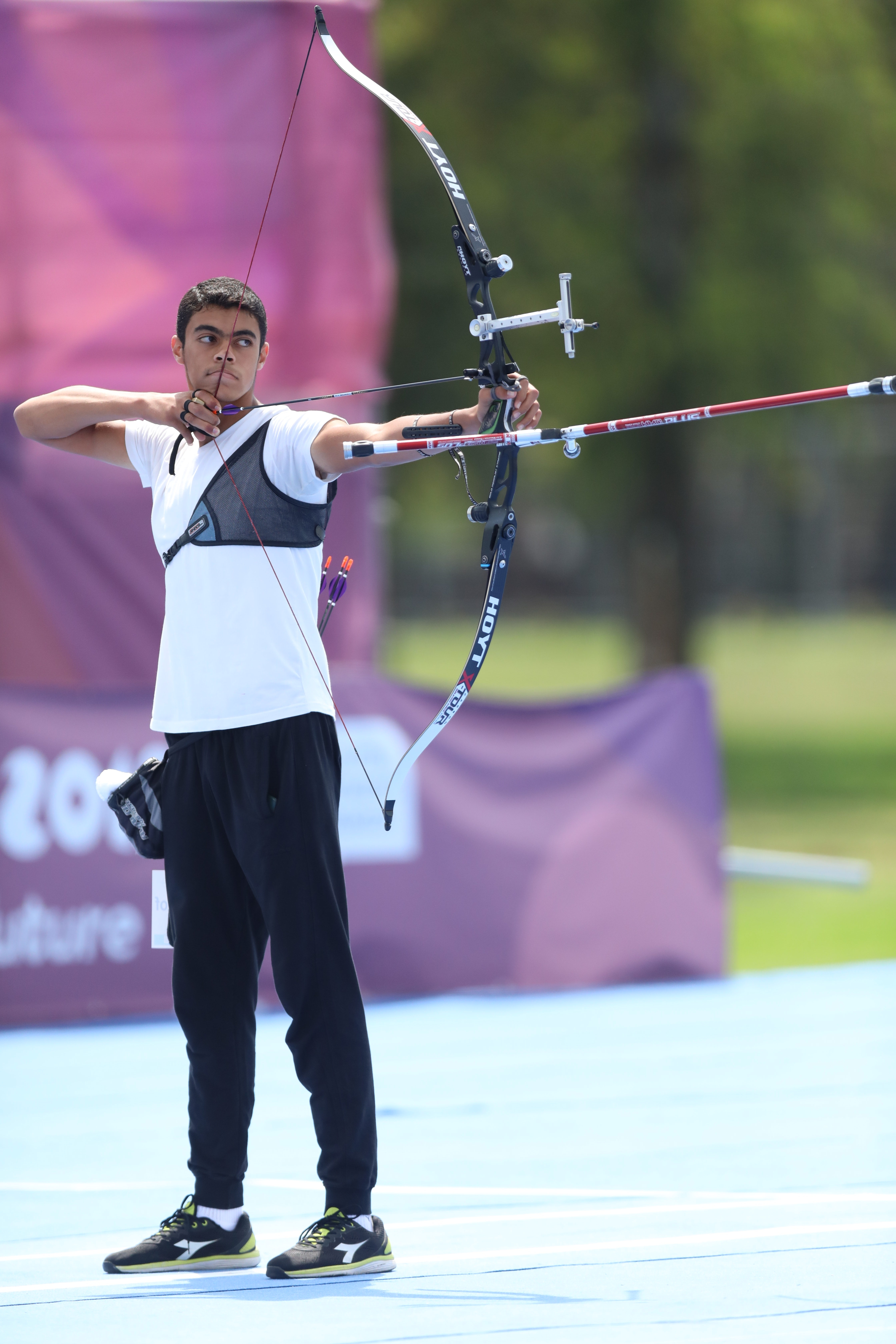
- Youssof Tolba at the 2018 Summer Youth Olympics

Personal information
- Nationality: Egyptian
- Born: 30 January 2001 (age 25)

Sport
- Sport: Archery
Medal record
Men's recurve archery
Representing Egypt
African Games
| Gold medal – first place | 2019 Rabat | Team |
| Gold medal – first place | 2019 Rabat | Mixed team |
| Bronze medal – third place | 2019 Rabat | Individual |

Youssof Tolba (born 30 January 2001) is an Egyptian archer. He competed in the men's individual event at the 2020 Summer Olympics in Tokyo, Japan.

In 2019, he won the bronze medal in the men's recurve event at the African Games held in Rabat, Morocco. He also won the gold medal in both the men's team recurve event and mixed team events.
