= Ousman Miangoto =

Chadian runner (born 1954)

Ousman Miangoto (born 15 October 1954) is a former middle distance athlete who competed internationally for Chad.

Miangoto was specialized in the 800 metres, with a personal best of 1:54.0 that he ran in 1981. He represented Chad at the 1984 Summer Olympics in Los Angeles. He competed in the 800 metres where he finished eighth in his heat so did not qualify for the next round.

Miangoto was the flag bearers for Chad during the 1984 Summer Olympics Parade of Nations.

As of 2025, he is still in list of top-20 best athletes from Chad ever.
