= Kimitene Biyago =

Chadian sprinter

Kimitene Biyago (born April 17, 1975) is a track and field sprint athlete who competed internationally for Chad

Biyago represented Chad at the 1996 Summer Olympics in Atlanta. He competed in the 400 metres where he finished seventh in his heat and therefore did not qualify for the next round.

Years later Biyago was appointed the technical coach for the Chad Athletics Federation.
