= Issaka Hassane =

Chadian sprinter

Issaka Hassane (born January 3, 1959) is a track and field sprint athlete who competed internationally for Chad.

Hassane set his personal best of 49.12 seconds over 400 m as a teenager at a meeting in 1978.

Hassane represented Chad at the 1984 Summer Olympics in Los Angeles, where he competed in the 400 metres. He finished 8th in his heat in 49.64 seconds, failing to progress.

He later became the national technical director of the Chadian Athletic Federation. As director, he trained athletes for the 2021 Islamic Solidarity Games (actually held in 2022) despite not having access to a running track to train on.
