= Archery at the 2019 African Games =

- Venue: Athletics track – Centre (National des Sports Moulay Rachid)
- Location: Salé, Morocco
- Dates: 27–30 August
- Competitors: 62 from 19 nations

Archery at the 2019 African Games was held from 27 to 30 August 2019 in Salé, Morocco.

This is the first time archery is included at the African Games.

The event served as a qualifier for the 2020 Summer Olympics in Tokyo, Japan.

== Schedule ==
R	Ranking round	E	Elimination rounds	F	Finals

Event↓/Date →	27th Tue	28th Wed	29th Thu	30th Fri
Men's individual	R		E	F
Men's team	R	E		F
Women's individual	R		E	F
Women's team	R	E		F
Mixed team	R	E		F

== Participating nations ==
- Algeria (6)
- Benin (1)
- Chad (6)
- Democratic Republic of the Congo (2)
- Egypt (6)
- Guinea (2)
- Ivory Coast (6)
- Kenya (3)
- Libya (1)
- Madagascar (1)
- Malawi (3)
- Mauritius (3)
- Morocco (6)
- Namibia (2)
- Niger (1)
- South Africa (4)
- Sudan (3)
- Tunisia (4)
- Zimbabwe (2)

== Results ==
=== Men ===
Event	Gold	Silver	Bronze
Individual recurve	Sherif Mohamed; Egypt	Mohamed Hammed; Tunisia	Youssof Tolba; Egypt
Team recurve	Egypt; Bahaaeldin Aly; Sherif Mohamed; Youssof Tolba	Tunisia; Sabeur Ben Brahim; Nabil Benromdhan; Mohamed Hammed	Algeria; Imadeddine Bakri; Abdelmajid Hocine; Ayoub Rahlaoui

=== Women ===
Event	Gold	Silver	Bronze
Individual recurve	Esmei Anne Marcelle Diombo; Ivory Coast	Rihab El Walid; Tunisia	Amal Adam; Egypt
Team recurve	Egypt; Amal Adam; Mira Elchammaa; Reem Mansour	Ivory Coast; Esmei Anne Marcelle Diombo; Fatou Gbane; Ekpobi Anne-marie Eleonord Yedagne	Chad; Aron Salome Atchoumgai; Martine Abaifouta Hallas Maria; Marlyse Hourtou

=== Mixed ===
Event	Gold	Silver	Bronze
Team	Egypt; Reem Mansour; Youssof Tolba	Namibia; Quinn Reddig; Adriaan Grobler	Chad; Marlyse Hourtou; Israel Madaye

== Medal table ==
Rank	Nation	Gold	Silver	Bronze	Total
1	Egypt (EGY)	4	0	2	6
2	Ivory Coast (CIV)	1	1	0	2
3	Tunisia (TUN)	0	3	0	3
4	Namibia (NAM)	0	1	0	1
5	Chad (CHA)	0	0	2	2
6	Algeria (ALG)	0	0	1	1
Totals (6 entries)		5	5	5	15
