= Reem Mansour =

Egyptian archer (born 1993)

Personal information
- Born: 20 December 1993 (age 32)

Sport
- Country: Egypt
- Sport: Archery
- Event: Recurve
Medal record
Representing Egypt
Archery
African Games
Gold medal – first place	2019 Rabat	Team recurve
Gold medal – first place	2019 Rabat	Mixed team
- Updated on 13 February 2020

Reem Mansour (born 20 December 1993) is an Egyptian recurve archer. She competed in the archery competition at the 2016 Summer Olympics in Rio de Janeiro.

In 2019, she competed in archery at the 2019 African Games held in Rabat, Morocco.
