= Moumi Sébergué =

Chadian sprinter

Moumi Sebergue (born 7 December 1977) is a track and field sprint athlete who competes internationally for Chad.

Sebergue represented Chad at the 2008 Summer Olympics in Beijing. He competed at the 100 metres sprint and placed 7th in his heat without advancing to the second round. He ran the distance in a time of 11.14 seconds.
