= Ahmed Senoussi =

Chadian high jumper

Ahmed Senoussi (born January 22, 1946) is a former Chadian high jumper.

He finished twelfth in the high jump final at the 1968 Olympic Games. He also competed at the 1972 Olympic Games without reaching the final.
