= Demos Memneloum =

Chadian judoka (born 1994)

Personal information
- Born: 6 June 1994 (age 32) N'Djamena, Chad
- Occupation: Judoka

Sport
- Country: Chad
- Sport: Judo
- Weight class: ‍–‍70 kg

Achievements and titles
- Olympic Games: R32 (2024)
- World Champ.: R32 (2018)
- African Champ.: (bronze) (2019)
Medal record
Women's judo
Representing Chad
African Games
Bronze medal – third place	2019 Rabat	‍–‍70 kg
African Championships
Bronze medal – third place	2019 Cape Town	‍–‍70 kg

Profile at external databases
- IJF: 8504
- JudoInside.com: 76249
- Updated on 31 July 2024

Demos Memneloum (born 6 June 1994) is a Chadian judoka who competes in the women's middleweight (70 kg) category. She won bronze medals at the 2019 African Judo Championships in Cape Town and the 2019 African Games in Rabat.

In 2021, she competed in the women's 70 kg event at the 2020 Summer Olympics in Tokyo, Japan.

Olympic Games
Preceded by Bibiro Ali Taher	Flag bearer for Chad; 2020 Tokyo with Bachir Mahamat; 2024 Paris with Israel Madaye	Succeeded by Incumbent
