= Bachir Mahamat =

Chadian sprinter

Personal information
- Full name: Bachir Ahmat Mahamat
- Born: 1 December 1996 (age 29) N'Djamena, Chad
- Height: 186 cm (6 ft 1 in)
- Weight: 59 kg (130 lb)

Sport
- Country: Chad
- Sport: Athletics

Bachir Ahmat Mahamat (born 1 December 1996) is a Chadian sprinter. He competed in the men's 400 metres at the 2016 Summer Olympics and the 2020 Summer Olympics.

== International competitions ==
Year	Competition	Venue	Position	Event	Notes
Representing Chad
2016	Olympic Games	Rio de Janeiro, Brazil	48th (h)	400 m	48.59
2017	Islamic Solidarity Games	Baku, Azerbaijan	11th (h)	400 m	48.23
2017	World Championships	London, United Kingdom	47th (h)	400 m	47.50
2019	World Championships	Doha, Qatar	36th (h)	400 m	47.65
2021	Olympic Games	Tokyo, Japan	42nd (h)	400 m	47.93

Olympic Games
Preceded by Bibiro Ali Taher	Flag bearer for Chad; 2020 Tokyo with Demos Memneloum	Succeeded by Incumbent
