= Gana Abba Kimet =

Chadian sprinter

Gana Abba Kimet (born May 12, 1946) is a track and field sprint athlete who competed internationally for Chad

Kimet represented Chad at the 1972 Summer Olympics in Munich. He competed in the 100 metres and finished 5th in his heat so didn't progress to the next round.
