= Marlyse Hourtou =

Chadian archer (born 1996)

Personal information
- Nationality: Chadian
- Born: 29 July 1996 (age 29)

Sport
- Sport: Archery
Medal record
Women's recurve archery
Representing Chad
African Games
Bronze medal – third place	2019 Rabat	Team
Bronze medal – third place	2019 Rabat	Mixed team

Marlyse Hourtou (born 29 July 1996) is a Chadian archer. She competed in the women's individual event at the 2020 Summer Olympics, becoming the first athlete from Chad to contest the Olympic Games in the sport. Hourtou was eliminated in the opening round by South Korea's An San and competed despite her single bow breaking during the course of the Games.

Hourtou also competed in the recurve events at the 2019 African Games in Rabat. Entering the Games with a world ranking of 339, she won two bronze medals in the women's team and mixed team events.
