= Chadian Olympic and Sports Committee =

National Olympic Committee

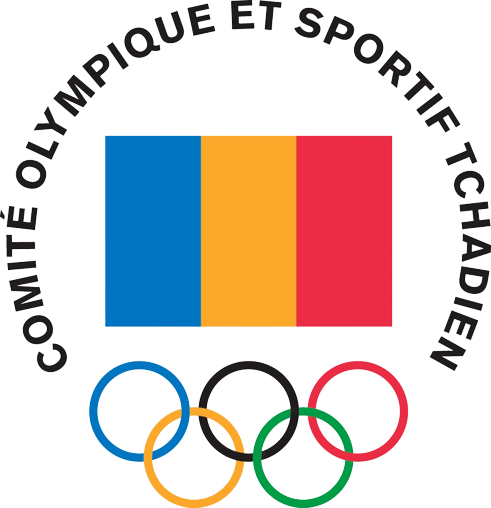
- Country: Chad
- Code: CHA
- Created: 1963
- Recognized: 1964
- Continental Association: ANOCA
- President: Abakar Djermah Aumi
- Secretary General: Baba Ahmat Baba

The Chadian Olympic and Sports Committee (French: Comité Olympique et Sportif Tchadien; Arabic: اللجنة الأولمبية والرياضية التشادية) (IOC code: CHA) is the National Olympic Committee representing Chad.
