= List of female speakers of national and territorial upper houses =

This list presents female speakers of national and territorial upper houses of their respective countries or territories. The upper house, often called the Senate, is the one of two chambers in a bicameral legislature. The upper house usually has less power than the lower house. In some countries, its members are appointed rather than elected by popular votes. The speaker of the upper house is the one who takes office as acting head of state in a presidential republic.

== National ==
Denotes incumbent speaker
- Italics denotes acting speaker and states that are either de facto (with limited to no international recognition) or defunct.

Name	Image	Country	Legislative Body	Mandate start	Mandate end	Term length
Olga Rudel-Zeynek		Austria	Federal Council	1 December 1927	31 May 1928	182 days
Olga Rudel-Zeynek		Austria	Federal Council	1 June 1932	30 November 1932	182 days
Ingeborg Hansen		Denmark	Landstinget	16 March 1950	25 April 1951	1 year, 40 days
Ingeborg Hansen		Denmark	Landstinget	7 October 1952	21 September 1953	349 days
Fathimath Ibrahim Didi		Maldives	Senate	1 January 1953	1 January 1954	1 year, 0 days
Johanna Bayer		Austria	Federal Council	1 July 1953	31 December 1953	183 days
Helene Tschitschko		Austria	Federal Council	1 January 1965	30 June 1965	180 days
Helene Tschitschko		Austria	Federal Council	1 July 1969	31 December 1969	183 days
Helene Tschitschko		Austria	Federal Council	1 January 1974	30 June 1974	180 days
María Lavalle Urbina		Mexico	Senate of the Republic	1 December 1965	31 August 1966	273 days
Muriel Fergusson		Canada	Senate	14 December 1972	11 September 1974	1 year, 271 days
Doris Louise Johnson		Bahamas	Senate	1973	1982	9 years, 0 days
Guadalupe López Bretón		Mexico	Senate of the Republic	1973	1974	1 year, 0 days
Isabel Perón		Argentina	Senate	12 October 1973	1 July 1974	262 days
Renaude Lapointe		Canada	Senate	12 September 1974	4 October 1979	5 years, 22 days
Tras Honan		Ireland	Seanad Éireann	13 May 1982	23 February 1983	286 days
Tras Honan		Ireland	Seanad Éireann	25 April 1987	1 November 1989	2 years, 190 days
Martha Chávez Padrón		Mexico	Senate of the Republic	1980	1980	365 days
Jeanette Rose Grant-Woodham		Jamaica	Senate	21 August 1984	1989	4 years, 133 days
Doris June Garcia		Belize	Senate	21 December 1984	31 July 1989	4 years, 222 days
Helga Hieden-Sommer		Austria	Federal Council	1 July 1987	31 December 1987	183 days
Jane Ellen Usher		Belize	Senate	15 September 1989	1 June 1993	3 years, 259 days
Margaret Neckles		Grenada	Senate	1990	1995	5 years, 0 days
Anna Elisabeth Haselbach		Austria	Federal Council	1 January 1991	30 June 1991	180 days
Anna Elisabeth Haselbach		Austria	Federal Council	1 July 1995	31 December 1995	183 days
Anna Elisabeth Haselbach		Austria	Federal Council	1 January 2000	30 June 2000	181 days
Anna Elisabeth Haselbach		Austria	Federal Council	1 July 2004	31 December 2004	183 days
Josi Meier		Switzerland	Council of States	25 November 1991	30 November 1992	1 year, 5 days
Millicent Percival		Antigua and Barbuda	Senate	1994	2004	10 years, 0 days
Katica Ivanišević		Croatia	Chamber of Counties	23 May 1994	28 March 2001	6 years, 309 days
Margaret Reid		Australia	Senate	20 August 1996	19 August 2002	5 years, 364 days
Alicja Grześkowiak		Poland	Senate	21 October 1997	18 October 2001	3 years, 362 days
Elizabeth Zabaneh		Belize	Senate	12 September 1998	July 2001	2 years, 292 days
Libuše Benešová		Czech Republic	Senate	16 December 1998	23 November 2000	1 year, 343 days
Esperanza Aguirre		Spain	Senate	9 February 1999	16 October 2002	3 years, 249 days
Naledi Pandor		South Africa	National Council of Provinces	21 June 1999	4 May 2004	4 years, 318 days
María de los Ángeles Moreno		Mexico	Senate of the Republic	2000	2000	365 days
Françoise Saudan		Switzerland	Council of States	27 November 2000	25 November 2001	363 days
Johanna Auer		Austria	Federal Council	28 December 2000	31 December 2000	3 days
Sylvia Flores		Belize	Senate	14 August 2001	4 February 2003	1 year, 174 days
Yolanda Eugenia González		Mexico	Senate of the Republic	1 September 2001	31 August 2002	364 days
Uta Barbara Pühringer		Austria	Federal Council	1 January 2002	30 June 2002	180 days
Linda Baboolal		Trinidad and Tobago	Senate	5 April 2002	17 December 2007	5 years, 256 days
Sharon R. Wilson		Bahamas	Senate	23 May 2002	23 May 2007	5 years, 0 days
Sharon R. Wilson		Bahamas	Senate	23 May 2012	24 May 2017	5 years, 1 day
Mirtha Quevedo Acalinovic		Bolivia	Chamber of Senators	August 2002	2003	153 days
Grace Minor (Note: President pro tempore)		Liberia	Senate	September 2002	2003	?
Yvonne Timmerman-Buck		Netherlands	Eerste Kamer	17 June 2003	6 October 2009	6 years, 111 days
Leslie-Ann Seon		Grenada	Senate	9 January 2004	2006	1 year, 357 days
Joyce Kgoali		South Africa	National Council of Provinces	4 May 2004	21 November 2004	201 days
Anne-Marie Lizin		Belgium	Senate	20 July 2004	12 July 2007	2 years, 357 days
Chikage Oogi		Japan	House of Councillors	30 July 2004	28 July 2007	2 years, 363 days
Hazelyn Francis		Antigua and Barbuda	Senate	7 January 2005	17 July 2014	9 years, 191 days
Claudia Blum		Colombia	Senate	20 July 2005	20 July 2006	1 year, 0 days
Edna Madzongwe		Zimbabwe	Senate	30 November 2005	11 September 2018	12 years, 285 days
Sissy Roth-Halvax		Austria	Federal Council	1 January 2006	30 June 2006	180 days
Gelane Zwane		Swaziland	Senate	23 February 2006	23 October 2018	12 years, 242 days
Helene Hayman, Baroness Hayman		United Kingdom	House of Lords	4 July 2006	31 August 2011	5 years, 58 days
Rosemary Husbands-Mathurin		Saint Lucia	Senate	10 January 2007	November 2008	1 year, 296 days
Lynn Holowesko		Bahamas	Senate	23 May 2007	23 May 2012	5 years, 0 days
Nancy Patricia Gutiérrez		Colombia	Senate	20 July 2007	20 July 2008	1 year, 0 days
Andrea Gill		Belize	Senate	14 March 2008	3 February 2012	3 years, 326 days
Joan Purcell		Grenada	Senate	20 August 2008	20 February 2013	13 years, 225 days
Gail V. Philip		Saint Lucia	Senate	23 December 2008	April 2010	1 year, 99 days
Rose Francine Rogombé		Gabon	Senate	16 February 2009	9 June 2009	113 days
Rose Francine Rogombé		Gabon	Senate	9 June 2009	27 February 2015	5 years, 263 days
Dušanka Majkić		Bosnia and Herzegovina	House of Peoples	26 February 2009	14 March 2009	16 days
Dušanka Majkić		Bosnia and Herzegovina	House of Peoples	14 July 2010	20 May 2011	310 days
Erika Forster-Vannini		Switzerland	Council of States	27 November 2009	26 November 2010	364 days
Ana María Romero		Bolivia	Chamber of Senators	19 January 2010	26 October 2010	298 days
Leonne Theodore-John		Saint Lucia	Senate	April 2010	December 2011	1 year, 244 days
Hannelore Kraft		Germany	Bundesrat	1 November 2010	31 October 2011	364 days
Susanne Neuwirth		Austria	Federal Council	1 July 2011	31 December 2011	183 days
Frances D'Souza, Baroness D'Souza		United Kingdom	House of Lords	1 September 2011	31 August 2016	4 years, 365 days
Valentina Matviyenko		Russia	Federation Council	21 September 2011	Incumbent	15 years, 12 days
Sabine de Bethune		Belgium	Senate	11 October 2011	14 October 2014	3 years, 3 days
Beatriz Rojkés de Alperovich (Note: Provisional president)		Argentina	Senate	30 November 2011	28 February 2014	2 years, 90 days
Kerryann Ifill		Barbados	Senate	19 March 2012	5 June 2018	6 years, 78 days
Gabriela Montaño		Bolivia	Chamber of Senators	24 July 2012	25 January 2015	2 years, 185 days
Ankie Broekers-Knol		Netherlands	Eerste Kamer	2 July 2013	11 June 2019	5 years, 344 days
Teresa Efua Asangono		Equatorial Guinea	Senate	12 July 2013	Incumbent	13 years, 83 days
Isabel Allende		Chile	Senate	11 March 2014	11 March 2015	1 year, 0 days
Thandi Modise		South Africa	National Council of Provinces	21 May 2014	22 May 2019	5 years, 1 day
Ana Blatnik		Austria	Federal Council	1 July 2014	31 December 2014	183 days
Alincia Williams-Grant		Antigua and Barbuda	Senate	17 July 2014	Incumbent	12 years, 78 days
Cristina Lizardo		Dominican Republic	Senate	16 August 2014	16 August 2016	2 years, 0 days
Christine Defraigne		Belgium	Senate	14 October 2014	14 December 2018	7 years, 293 days
Sonja Zwazl		Austria	Federal Council	1 January 2015	30 June 2015	180 days
Raziah Ahmed		Trinidad and Tobago	Senate	3 February 2015	23 September 2015	232 days
Lucie Milebou Aubusson		Gabon	Senate	27 February 2015	30 August 2023	8 years, 184 days
Christine Kangaloo		Trinidad and Tobago	Senate	23 September 2015	17 January 2023	7 years, 116 days
Margaret Mensah-Williams		Namibia	National Council	8 December 2015	9 December 2019	4 years, 1 day
Gabriela Michetti		Argentina	Senate	10 December 2015	10 December 2019	4 years, 0 days
Malu Dreyer		Germany	Bundesrat	1 November 2016	31 October 2017	364 days
Sonja Ledl-Rossmann		Austria	Federal Council	1 January 2017	30 June 2017	180 days
Katherine Forbes-Smith		Bahamas	Senate	24 May 2017	5 December 2019	2 years, 195 days
Mamonaheng Mokitimi		Lesotho	Senate	11 July 2017	Incumbent	9 years, 84 days
Lucía Topolansky		Uruguay	Chamber of Senators	13 September 2017	14 February 2020	2 years, 154 days
Karin Keller-Sutter		Switzerland	Council of States	28 November 2017	27 November 2018	364 days
Jeannine Giraudy-McIntyre		Saint Lucia	Senate	20 March 2018	17 August 2021	3 years, 150 days
Elisabetta Casellati		Italy	Senate of the Republic	24 March 2018	12 October 2022	4 years, 202 days
Keria Ibrahim		Ethiopia	House of Federation	6 May 2018	9 June 2020	2 years, 34 days
Inge Posch-Gruska		Austria	Federal Council	1 July 2018	1 January 2019	184 days
Mabel Chinomona		Zimbabwe	Senate	11 September 2018	Incumbent	8 years, 22 days
Princess Lindiwe Dlamini		Eswatini	Senate	23 October 2018	Incumbent	7 years, 345 days
Adriana Salvatierra		Bolivia	Senate	18 January 2019	14 November 2019	300 days
Jewel Taylor		Liberia	Senate	22 January 2018	22 January 2024	6 years, 0 days
Dariga Nazarbayeva		Kazakhstan	Senate	20 March 2019	2 May 2020	1 year, 43 days
Tanzila Norbaeva		Uzbekistan	Senate	21 June 2019	Incumbent	7 years, 104 days
Sabine Laruelle		Belgium	Senate	15 July 2019	13 October 2020	1 year, 90 days
Akiko Santō		Japan	House of Councillors	1 August 2019	3 August 2022	3 years, 2 days
Mónica Fernández Balboa		Mexico	Senate of the Republic	1 September 2019	31 August 2020	365 days
Mónica Eva Copa		Bolivia	Senate	14 November 2019	3 November 2020	355 days
Pilar Llop		Spain	Senate	3 December 2019	8 July 2021	1 year, 217 days
Mildred Hall-Watson		Bahamas	Senate	5 December 2019	6 October 2021	1 year, 305 days
Natalya Kochanova		Belarus	Council of the Republic	9 December 2019	Incumbent	6 years, 297 days
Cristina Fernández de Kirchner		Argentina	Senate	10 December 2019	10 December 2023	4 years, 0 days
Claudia Ledesma Abdala		Argentina	Senate	10 December 2019	10 December 2023	4 years, 0 days
Beatriz Argimón		Uruguay	Chamber of Senators	1 March 2020	15 February 2025	4 years, 351 days
Adriana Muñoz D'Albora		Chile	Senate	17 March 2020	17 March 2021	1 year, 0 days
Andrea Eder-Gitschthaler		Austria	Federal Council	1 July 2020	31 December 2020	183 days
Andrea Eder-Gitschthaler		Austria	Federal Council	1 January 2025	30 June 2025	180 days
Stephanie D'Hose		Belgium	Senate	13 October 2020	18 May 2024	3 years, 218 days
Carolyn Trench-Sandiford		Belize	Senate	11 December 2020	Incumbent	5 years, 296 days
Anca Dragu		Romania	Senate	21 December 2020	23 November 2021	337 days
Kamala Harris		United States	Senate	20 January 2021	20 January 2025	4 years, 0 days
Yasna Provoste		Chile	Senate	17 March 2021	25 August 2021	161 days
Ximena Rincón		Chile	Senate	25 August 2021	11 March 2022	198 days
Olga Sánchez Cordero		Mexico	Senate of the Republic	1 September 2021	31 August 2022	364 days
Lashell Adderley		Bahamas	Senate	6 October 2021	Incumbent	4 years, 362 days
Christine Schwarz-Fuchs		Austria	Federal Council	1 January 2022	30 June 2022	180 days
Christine Schwarz-Fuchs		Austria	Federal Council	1 July 2026	Incumbent	94 days
Korinna Schumann		Austria	Federal Council	1 July 2022	31 December 2022	183 days
Sue Lines		Australia	Senate	26 July 2022	Incumbent	4 years, 69 days
Dessima Williams		Grenada	Senate	31 August 2022	Incumbent	4 years, 33 days
Alvina Reynolds		Saint Lucia	Senate	24 November 2022	Incumbent	3 years, 313 days
Brigitte Häberli-Koller		Switzerland	Council of States	28 November 2022	4 December 2023	1 year, 6 days
Patty Murray (Note: President pro tempore)		United States	Senate	3 January 2023	3 January 2025	2 years, 0 days
Raymonde Gagné		Canada	Senate	12 May 2023	Incumbent	3 years, 144 days
Claudia Arpa		Austria	Federal Council	1 July 2023	31 December 2023	183 days
Ana Lilia Rivera		Mexico	Senate of the Republic	1 September 2023	31 August 2024	365 days
Paulette Missambo		Gabon	Senate	11 September 2023	17 December 2025	2 years, 97 days
Kandia Camara		Ivory Coast	Senate	12 October 2023	Incumbent	2 years, 356 days
Manuela Schwesig		Germany	Bundesrat	1 November 2023	31 October 2024	365 days
Małgorzata Kidawa-Błońska		Poland	Senate	13 November 2023	Incumbent	2 years, 324 days
Eva Herzog		Switzerland	Council of States	4 December 2023	2 December 2024	364 days
Victoria Villarruel		Argentina	Senate	10 December 2023	Incumbent	2 years, 297 days
Margit Göll		Austria	Federal Council	1 January 2024	30 June 2024	181 days
Nyonblee Karnga-Lawrence (Note: President pro tempore)		Liberia	Senate	15 January 2024	Incumbent	2 years, 261 days
Refilwe Mtsweni-Tsipane		South Africa	National Council of Provinces	15 June 2024	Incumbent	2 years, 110 days
Valérie De Bue		Belgium	Senate	25 July 2024	21 February 2025	211 days
Anke Rehlinger		Germany	Bundesrat	1 November 2024	31 October 2025	364 days
Carolina Cosse		Uruguay	Chamber of Senators	1 March 2025	Incumbent	1 year, 216 days
Laura Itzel Castillo		Mexico	Senate of the Republic	1 September 2025	31 August 2026	364 days
Mei Li Vos		Netherlands	Senate	7 October 2025	Incumbent	361 days
Huguette Nyana Ekoume		Gabon	Senate	17 December 2025	Incumbent	290 days
Paulina Núñez		Chile	Senate	11 March 2026	Incumbent	206 days

== Territorial ==
Denotes incumbent speaker of parliament

Name	Image	Territory	Legislative Body	Mandate start	Mandate end	Term length
Carol Bassett		Bermuda	Senate	2008	19 July 2017	9 years, 199 days
Clare Christian		Isle of Man	Legislative Council and Tynwald	12 July 2011	19 July 2016	5 years, 7 days
Joan Dillas-Wright		Bermuda	Senate	19 July 2017	Incumbent	9 years, 76 days

== See also ==
- List of current presidents of legislatures
- Bicameralism
- List of legislatures by country
- Parliament
- Speaker (politics)
- Upper house
