= List of presidents of the Federal Council (Austria) =

President of the Federal Council
- Präsident des Österreischischen Bundesrates
- Coat of arms

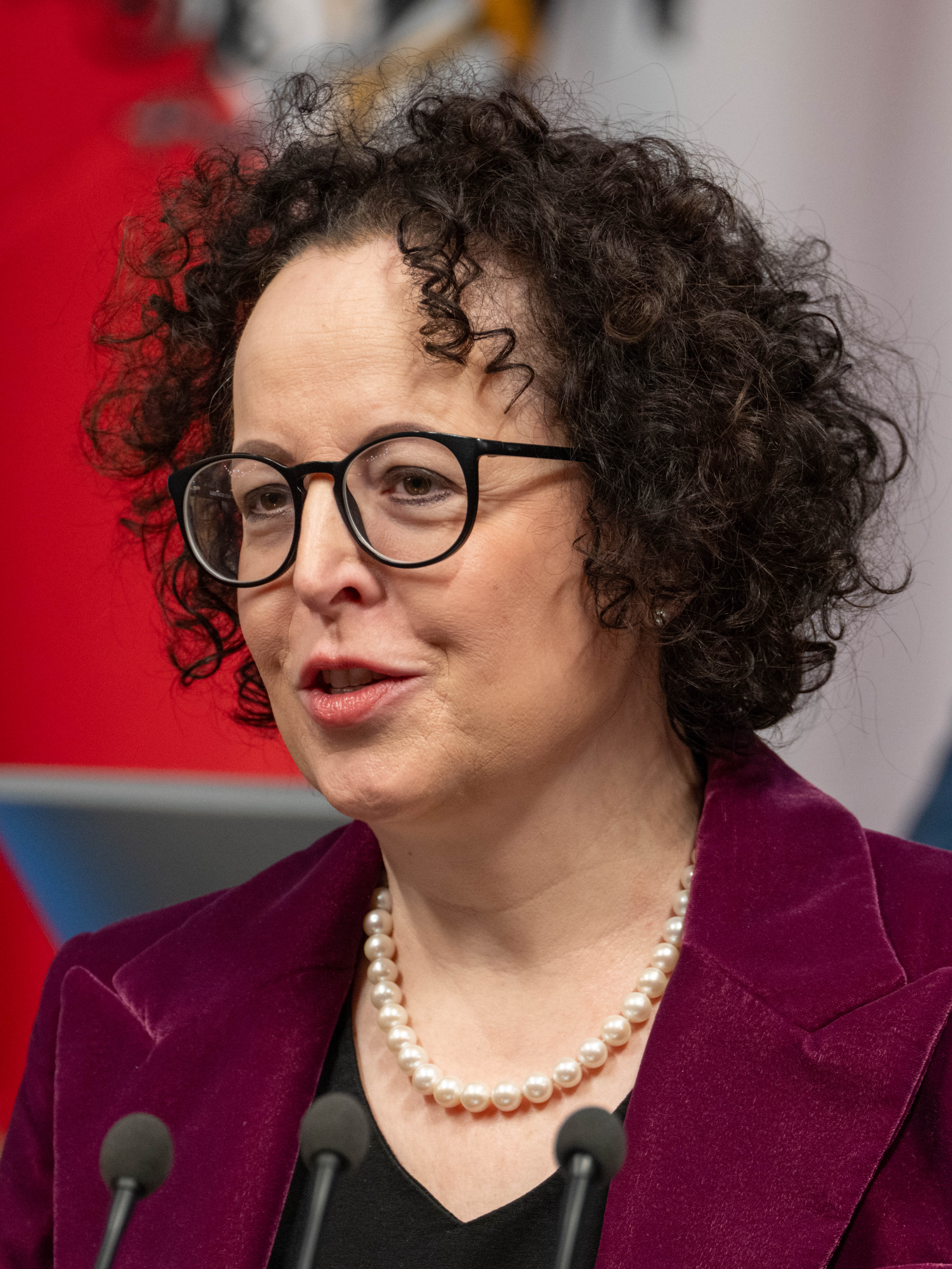
- Incumbent; Christine Schwarz-Fuchs since 1 July 2026
- Federal Council of Austria
- Style: Ms. President (within the council)
- Status: Presiding officer
- Member of: Federal Council
- Seat: Parliament Building; Innere Stadt, Vienna
- Constituting instrument: Constitution of Austria

This is a list of presidents of the Federal Council of Austria.

== First Republic ==
| Name | Entered office | Left office | Party |
|---|---|---|---|
| Jakob Reumann | December 1, 1920 | May 31, 1921 | SDAPÖ |
| Josef Pflanzl | June 1, 1921 | July 21, 1921 | GDUP |
| Julius Lukas | July 22, 1921 | November 30, 1921 | SDAPÖ |
| Johann Mayer | December 1, 1921 | February 21, 1922 | CS |
| Josef Zwetzbacher | February 22, 1922 | May 31, 1922 | CS |
| Josef Schwinner | June 1, 1922 | November 30, 1922 | CS |
| Franz Rehrl | December 1, 1923 | May 31, 1923 | CS |
| Anton Rintelen | June 1, 1923 | November 19, 1923 | CS |
| Hans Hocheneder | November 20, 1923 | November 30, 1923 | CS |
| Richard Steidle | December 1, 1923 | May 31, 1924 | CS |
| Otto Ender | June 1, 1924 | November 30, 1925 | CS |
| Jakob Reumann | December 1, 1925 | May 31, 1925 | SDAPÖ |
| Johann Thullner | June 1, 1925 | November 30, 1925 | CS |
| Franz Reinprecht | December 1, 1925 | May 31, 1926 | CS |
| Rudolf Beirer | June 1, 1926 | November 30, 1926 | CS |
| Karl Aubert Salzmann | December 1, 1926 | May 31, 1927 | CS |
| Franz Rehrl | June 1, 1927 | November 30, 1927 | CS |
| Olga Rudel-Zeynek | December 1, 1927 | May 31, 1928 | CS |
| Richard Steidle | June 1, 1928 | November 30, 1928 | CS |
| Otto Ender | December 1, 1928 | May 31, 1929 | CS |
| Johann Schorsch | June 1, 1929 | November 30, 1929 | CS |
| Rudolf Burgmann | December 1, 1929 | May 31, 1930 | CS |
| Wilhelm Eich | June 1, 1930 | November 30, 1930 | SDAPÖ |
| Josef Stöckler | December 1, 1930 | May 31, 1931 | CS |
| Karl Albert Salzmann | June 1, 1931 | November 30, 1931 | CS |
| Franz Rehrl | December 1, 1931 | May 31, 1932 | CS |
| Olga Rudel-Zeynek | June 1, 1932 | November 30, 1932 | CS |
| Franz Stumpf | December 1, 1932 | May 31, 1933 | CS |
| Otto Ender | June 1, 1933 | November 30, 1933 | CS |
| Theodor Körner | December 1, 1933 | February 17, 1934 | SDAPÖ |
| Franz Hemala | April 30, 1934 | April 30, 1934 | CS |

== Second Republic ==
| Name | Entered office | Left office | Party |
|---|---|---|---|
| Karl Honay | December 19, 1945 | June 30, 1946 | SPÖ |
| Wilhelm Riedl | July 1, 1946 | December 31, 1946 | SPÖ |
| Adolf Populorum | January 1, 1947 | June 30, 1947 | SPÖ |
| Karl Eichinger | July 1, 1947 | December 31, 1947 | ÖVP |
| Josef Stampfl | January 1, 1948 | June 30, 1948 | ÖVP |
| Josef Rehrl | July 1, 1948 | December 31, 1948 | ÖVP |
| Josef Zingl | January 1, 1949 | June 30, 1949 | ÖVP |
| Franz Lechner | July 1, 1949 | December 31, 1949 | ÖVP |
| Adolf Vögel | January 1, 1950 | June 30, 1950 | ÖVP |
| Richard Freund | July 1, 1950 | December 31, 1950 | SPÖ |
| Jakob Mädl | January 1, 1951 | June 30, 1951 | ÖVP |
| Hans Herke | July 1, 1951 | December 31, 1951 | SPÖ |
| Leopold Weinmayer | January 1, 1952 | June 30, 1952 | ÖVP |
| Ernst Grundemann-Falkenberg | July 1, 1952 | December 31, 1952 | ÖVP |
| Friderich Gugg | January 1, 1953 | June 30, 1953 | ÖVP |
| Johanna Bayer | July 1, 1953 | December 31, 1953 | ÖVP |
| Franz Lechner | January 1, 1954 | May 18, 1954 | ÖVP |
| Anton Brugger | May 19, 1954 | May 26, 1954 | ÖVP |
| Franz Weber | May 27, 1954 | June 30, 1954 | ÖVP |
| Adolf Vögel | July 1, 1954 | December 31, 1954 | ÖVP |
| Hans Riemer | January 1, 1955 | June 30, 1955 | SPÖ |
| Anton Frisch | July 1, 1955 | December 31, 1955 | ÖVP |
| Hans Herke | January 1, 1956 | June 1, 1956 | SPÖ |
| Erich Suchanek | June 2, 1956 | June 30, 1956 | SPÖ |
| Theodor Eggendorfer | July 1, 1956 | December 31, 1956 | ÖVP |
| Wilhelm Salzer | January 1, 1957 | June 30, 1957 | ÖVP |
| Friedrich Gugg | July 1, 1957 | December 31, 1957 | ÖVP |
| Leopold Babitsch | January 1, 1958 | June 30, 1958 | ÖVP |
| Karl Marberger | July 1, 1958 | December 31, 1958 | ÖVP |
| Adolf Vögel | January 1, 1959 | June 30, 1959 | ÖVP |
| Otto Skritek | July 1, 1959 | December 31, 1959 | SPÖ |
| Franz Kroyer | January 1, 1960 | June 30, 1960 | ÖVP |
| Josef Guttenbrunner | July 1, 1960 | December 31, 1960 | SPÖ |
| Theodor Eggendorfer | January 1, 1961 | June 30, 1961 | ÖVP |
| Wilhelm Salzer | July 1, 1961 | November 16, 1961 | ÖVP |
| Leopold Helbich | November 17, 1961 | December 31, 1961 | ÖVP |
| Friedrich Gugg | January 1, 1962 | June 30, 1962 | ÖVP |
| Otto Hofmann-Wellenhof | July 1, 1962 | December 31, 1962 | ÖVP |
| Franz Gschnitzer | January 1, 1963 | June 30, 1963 | ÖVP |
| Franz Bürkle | July 1, 1963 | December 31, 1963 | ÖVP |
| Otto Skritek | January 1, 1964 | June 30, 1964 | SPÖ |
| Hans Besucha | July 1, 1964 | December 31, 1964 | SPÖ |
| Helene Tschitschko | January 1, 1965 | June 30, 1965 | SPÖ |
| Theodor Eggendorfer | July 1, 1965 | December 31, 1965 | ÖVP |
| Jörg Iro | January 1, 1966 | June 30, 1966 | ÖVP |
| Friedrich Gugg | July 1, 1966 | December 21, 1966 | 'OVP |
| Hans Heger | December 22, 1966 | December 31, 1966 | 'OVP |
| Josef Krainer senior | January 1, 1967 | June 30, 1967 | ÖVP |
| Anton Brugger | July 1, 1967 | December 31, 1967 | ÖVP |
| Hans Bürkle | January 1, 1968 | June 30, 1968 | ÖVP |
| Hans Pitschmann | July 1, 1968 | December 31, 1968 | ÖVP |
| Alfred Porges | July 1, 1968 | December 31, 1968 | SPÖ |
| Thomas Wagner | January 1, 1969 | June 30, 1969 | SPÖ |
| Helene Tschitschko | July 1, 1969 | December 31, 1969 | SPÖ |
| Michael Göschelbauer | January 1, 1970 | June 30, 1970 | ÖVP |
| Franz Fruhstorfer | July 1, 1970 | December 31, 1970 | SPÖ |
| Hans Heger | January 1, 1971 | June 30, 1971 | ÖVP |
| Otto Hoffman-Wellenhof | July 1, 1971 | December 31, 1971 | ÖVP |
| Helmut Mader | January 1, 1972 | June 30, 1972 | ÖVP |
| Hans Bürkle | July 1, 1972 | December 31, 1972 | ÖVP |
| Franz Skotton | January 1, 1973 | June 30, 1973 | ÖVP |
| Stefan Trenovatz | July 1, 1973 | December 31, 1973 | SPÖ |
| Helene Tschitschko | January 1, 1974 | June 30, 1974 | SPÖ |
| Michael Göschelbauer | July 1, 1974 | December 31, 1974 | ÖVP |
| Georg Schreiner | January 1, 1975 | June 30, 1975 | ÖVP |
| Hans Heger | July 1, 1975 | December 31, 1975 | ÖVP |
| Otto Hoffman-Wellenhof | January 1, 1976 | June 30, 1976 | ÖVP |
| Rudolf Schwaiger | July 1, 1976 | December 31, 1976 | ÖVP |
| Hans Bürkle | January 1, 1977 | June 30, 1977 | ÖVP |
| Franz Skotton | July 1, 1977 | December 31, 1977 | SPÖ |
| Josef Medl | January 1, 1978 | June 30, 1978 | SPÖ |
| Franz Tratter | July 1, 1978 | December 31, 1978 | SPÖ |
| Michael Göschelbauer | January 1, 1979 | June 30, 1979 | ÖVP |
| Georg Schreiner | July 1, 1979 | October 24, 1979 | ÖVP |
| Josef Knoll | October 25, 1979 | December 31, 1979 | ÖVP |
| Hans Heger | January 1, 1980 | June 30, 1980 | ÖVP |
| Otto Hofmann-Wellenhof | July 1, 1980 | December 31, 1980 | ÖVP |
| Rudolf Schwaiger | January 1, 1981 | June 30, 1981 | ÖVP |
| Hans Pitschmann | July 1, 1981 | December 31, 1981 | ÖVP |
| Franz Skotton | January 1, 1982 | June 30, 1982 | SPÖ |
| Anton Berger | July 1, 1982 | December 31, 1982 | SPÖ |
| Franz Tratter | January 1, 1983 | June 30, 1983 | SPÖ |
| Michael Göschelbauer | July 1, 1983 | December 30, 1983 | ÖVP |
| Josef Wöginger | December 31, 1983 | December 31, 1983 | ÖVP |
| Josef Knoll | January 1, 1984 | June 30, 1984 | ÖVP |
| Helmut Frauscher | July 1, 1984 | December 31, 1984 | ÖVP |
| Eduard Pumpernig | January 1, 1985 | June 30, 1985 | ÖVP |
| Rudolf Schwaiger | July 1, 1985 | December 31, 1985 | ÖVP |
| Georg Ludescher | January 1, 1986 | June 30, 1986 | ÖVP |
| Reinhold Suttner | July 1, 1986 | December 31, 1986 | SPÖ |
| Gerhard Frasz | January 1, 1987 | June 30, 1987 | SPÖ |
| Helga Hieden-Sommer | July 1, 1987 | December 31, 1987 | SPÖ |
| Herbert Schambeck | January 1, 1988 | June 30, 1988 | ÖVP |
| Erwin Köstler | July 1, 1988 | December 31, 1988 | ÖVP |
| Helmut Frauscher | January 1, 1989 | June 30, 1989 | ÖVP |
| Anton Nigl | July 1, 1989 | December 31, 1989 | ÖVP |
| Martin Strimitzer | January 1, 1990 | June 30, 1990 | ÖVP |
| Georg Ludescher | July 1, 1990 | December 31, 1990 | ÖVP |
| Anna Elisabeth Haselbach | January 1, 1991 | June 30, 1991 | SPÖ |
| Franz Pomper | July 1, 1991 | December 31, 1991 | SPÖ |
| Dietmar Wedenig | January 1, 1992 | June 30, 1992 | SPÖ |
| Herbert Schambeck | July 1, 1992 | December 31, 1992 | ÖVP |
| Erich Holzinger | January 1, 1993 | June 30, 1993 | ÖVP |
| Helmut Frauscher | July 1, 1993 | October 19, 1993 | ÖVP |
| Ludwig Bieringer | October 20, 1993 | December 31, 1993 | ÖVP |
| Alfred Gerstl | January 1, 1994 | June 30, 1994 | ÖVP |
| Gottfried Jaud | July 1, 1994 | December 31, 1994 | ÖVP |
| Jürgen Weiss | January 1, 1995 | June 30, 1995 | ÖVP |
| Anna Elisabeth Haselbach | July 1, 1995 | December 31, 1995 | SPÖ |
| Johann Payer | January 1, 1996 | June 30, 1996 | SPÖ |
| Josef Pfeifer | July 1, 1996 | December 31, 1996 | SPÖ |
| Herbert Schambeck | January 1, 1997 | June 30, 1997 | ÖVP |
| Günther Hummer | July 1, 1997 | December 31, 1997 | ÖVP |
| Ludwig Bieringer | January 1, 1998 | June 30, 1998 | ÖVP |
| Alfred Gerstl | July 1, 1998 | December 31, 1998 | ÖVP |
| Gottfried Jaud | January 1, 1999 | June 30, 1999 | ÖVP |
| Jürgen Weiss | July 1, 1999 | December 31, 1999 | ÖVP |
| Anna Elisabeth Haselbach | January 1, 2000 | June 30, 2000 | SPÖ |
| Johann Payer | July 1, 2000 | December 27, 2000 | SPÖ |
| Johanna Auer | December 28, 2000 | December 31, 2000 | SPÖ |
| Gerd Klamt | January 1, 2001 | June 30, 2001 | FPÖ |
| Alfred Schöls | July 1, 2001 | December 31, 2001 | ÖVP |
| Uta Barbara Pühringer | January 1, 2002 | June 30, 2002 | ÖVP |
| Ludwig Bieringer | July 1, 2002 | December 31, 2002 | ÖVP |
| Herwig Hösele | January 1, 2003 | June 30, 2003 | ÖVP |
| Hans Ager | July 1, 2003 | December 31, 2003 | ÖVP |
| Jürgen Weiss | January 1, 2004 | June 30, 2004 | ÖVP |
| Anna Elisabeth Haselbach | July 1, 2004 | December 31, 2004 | SPÖ |
| Georg Pehm | January 1, 2005 | June 30, 2005 | SPÖ |
| Peter Mitterer | July 1, 2005 | December 31, 2005 | FPÖ/BZÖ |
| Sissy Roth-Halvax | January 1, 2006 | June 30, 2006 | ÖVP |
| Gottfried Kneifel | July 1, 2006 | December 31, 2006 | ÖVP |
| Manfred Gruber | January 1, 2007 | June 30, 2007 | SPÖ |
| Wolfgang Erlitz | July 1, 2007 | December 31, 2007 | SPÖ |
| Helmut Kritzinger | January 1, 2008 | June 30, 2008 | ÖVP |
| Jürgen Weiss | July 1, 2008 | December 31, 2008 | ÖVP |
| Harald Reisenberger | January 1, 2009 | June 30, 2009 | SPÖ |
| Erwin Preiner | July 1, 2009 | December 31, 2009 | SPÖ |
| Peter Mitterer | January 1, 2010 | June 30, 2010 | BZÖ |
| Martin Preineder | July 1, 2010 | December 31, 2010 | ÖVP |
| Gottfried Kneifel | January 1, 2011 | June 30, 2011 | ÖVP |
| Susanne Neuwirth | July 1, 2011 | December 31, 2011 | SPÖ |
| Gregor Hammerl | January 1, 2012 | June 30, 2012 | ÖVP |
| Georg Keuschnigg | July 1, 2012 | December 31, 2012 | ÖVP |
| Edgar Mayer | January 1, 2013 | June 30, 2013 | ÖVP |
| Reinhard Todt | July 1, 2013 | December 31, 2013 | SPÖ |
| Michael Lampel | January 1, 2014 | July 1, 2014 | SPÖ |
| Ana Blatnik | July 1, 2014 | December 31, 2014 | SPÖ |
| Sonja Zwazl | January 1, 2015 | June 30, 2015 | ÖVP |
| Gottfried Kneifel | July 1, 2015 | December 31, 2015 | ÖVP |
| Josef Saller | January 1, 2016 | June 30, 2016 | ÖVP |
| Mario Lindner | July 1, 2016 | December 31, 2016 | SPÖ |
| Sonja Ledl-Rossmann | January 1, 2017 | June 30, 2017 | ÖVP |
| Edgar Mayer | July 1, 2017 | December 31, 2017 | ÖVP |
| Reinhard Todt | January 1, 2018 | June 30, 2018 | SPÖ |
| Inge Posch-Gruska | July 1, 2018 | December 31, 2018 | SPÖ |
| Ingo Appé | January 1, 2019 | June 30, 2019 | SPÖ |
| Karl Bader | July 1, 2019 | December 31, 2019 | ÖVP |
| Robert Seeber | January 1, 2020 | June 30, 2020 | ÖVP |
| Andrea Eder-Gitschthaler | July 1, 2020 | December 31, 2020 | ÖVP |
| Christian Buchmann | January 1, 2021 | June 30, 2021 | ÖVP |
| Peter Raggl | July 1, 2021 | December 31, 2021 | ÖVP |
| Christine Schwarz-Fuchs | January 1, 2022 | June 30, 2022 | ÖVP |
| Korinna Schumann | July 1, 2022 | December 31, 2022 | SPÖ |
| Günter Kovacs | January 1, 2023 | June 30, 2023 | SPÖ |
| Claudia Arpa | July 1, 2023 | December 31, 2023 | SPÖ |
| Margit Göll | January 1, 2024 | June 30, 2024 | ÖVP |
| Franz Ebner | July 1, 2024 | December 31, 2024 | ÖVP |
| Andrea Eder-Gitschthaler | January 1, 2025 | June 30, 2025 | ÖVP |
| Peter Samt | July 1, 2025 | December 31, 2025 | FPÖ |
| Markus Stotter | January 1, 2026 | June 30, 2026 | ÖVP |
| Christine Schwarz-Fuchs | July 1, 2026 | Incumbent | ÖVP |

== See also ==
- Federal Council of Austria
