= Reinhard Todt =

Austrian politician (1949–2025)

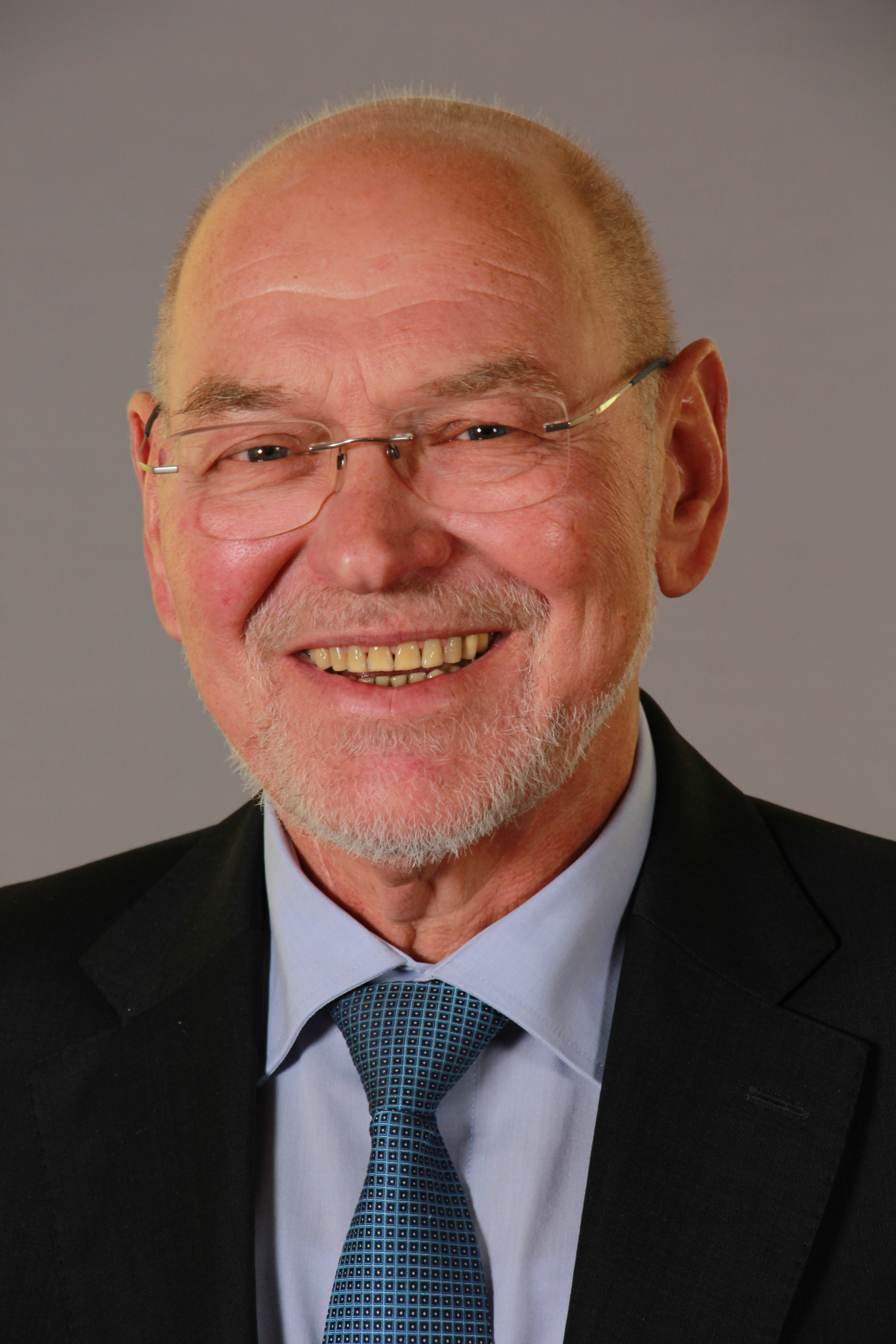

President of the Federal Council
- In office 1 January 2018 – 30 June 2018
- Preceded by: Edgar Mayer
- Succeeded by: Inge Posch-Gruska
- In office 1 July 2013 – 31 December 2013
- Preceded by: Edgar Mayer
- Succeeded by: Michael Lampel

Member of the Federal Council from Vienna
- In office 27 April 2001 – 20 January 2025
- Affiliation: Social Democratic Party

Personal details
- Born: 22 January 1949 St. Pantaleon, Upper Austria, Austria
- Died: 20 January 2025 (aged 75)
- Party: Social Democratic Party

Reinhard Todt (22 January 1949 – 20 January 2025) was an Austrian politician and from 2001 a member to the Federal Council from Vienna. He was President of the Federal Council from 1 July 2013 to 31 December 2013 and from 1 January 2018 to 30 June 2018. Todt died on 20 January 2025, at the age of 75.
