= Gerd Krusche =

Austrian politician (born 1955)

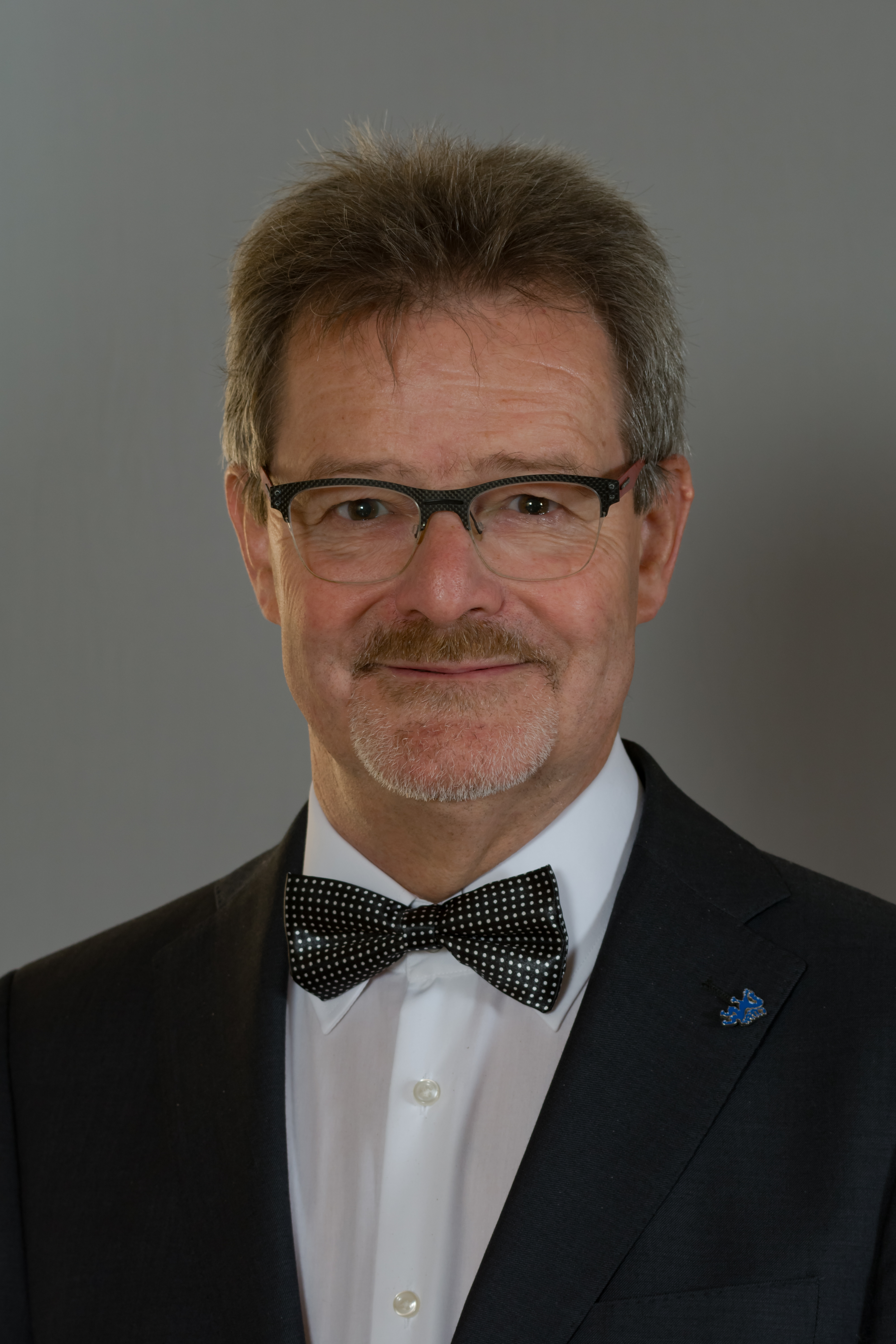

Member of the Federal Council
- Incumbent
- Assumed office 21 October 2010

Personal details
- Born: 5 May 1955 (age 70)
- Party: Freedom Party of Austria

Gerd Krusche (born 5 May 1955) is an Austrian politician who has been a Member of the Federal Council for the Freedom Party of Austria (FPÖ) since 2010.
