= Reinhard Pisec =

Austrian politician (born 1961)

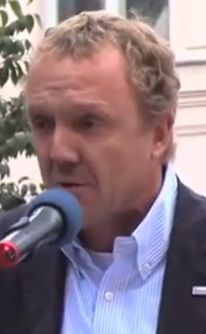
- Reinhard Pisec

Member of the Federal Council
- Incumbent
- Assumed office 25 November 2010

Personal details
- Born: 4 March 1961 (age 65)
- Party: Freedom Party of Austria

Reinhard Pisec (born 4 March 1961) is an Austrian politician who has been a Member of the Federal Council for the Freedom Party of Austria (FPÖ) since 2010.

He graduated from the University of Vienna with a BA in history in 2012.
