= Peter Mitterer =

Austrian politician

Peter Mitterer (23 November 1946 – 25 October 2013) was an Austrian politician. Mitterer served as a member the Federal Council, the upper chamber of the Austrian Parliament, from 2005 until his death in 2013. He simultaneously served as the President of the Federal Council of Austria in 2005 and again in 2010.

Mitterer died on 25 October 2013, at the age of 66.
