= Hans Riemer =

Hans Riemer may refer to:

- Hans Riemer (Austrian politician) (1901–1963)
- Hans Riemer (American politician) (born 1972)
