= Thomas Schererbauer =

Austrian politician (born 1972)

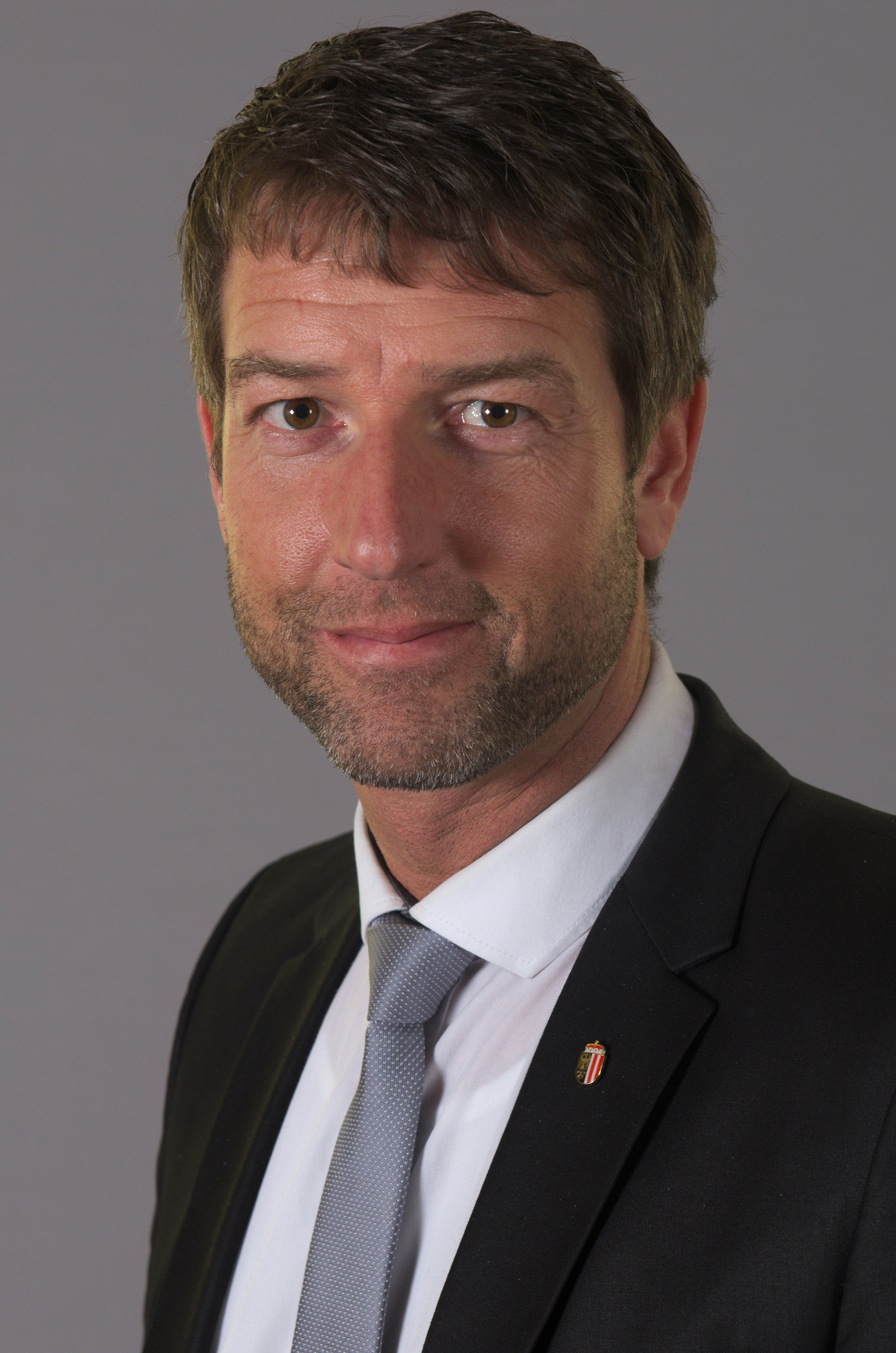

Member of the Federal Council
- In office 23 October 2015 – 2021

Personal details
- Born: 23 December 1972 (age 53)
- Party: Freedom Party of Austria

Thomas Schererbauer (born 23 December 1972) is an Austrian politician who has previously been a Member of the Federal Council for the Freedom Party of Austria (FPÖ) from 2015 to 2021.
