= Christian Buchmann =

Austrian politician (born 1962)

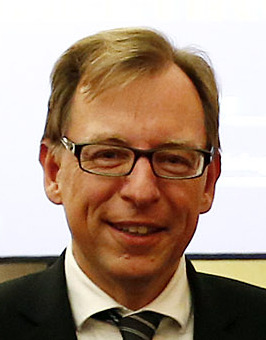

President of the Federal Council of Austria
- In office 1 January 2021 – 30 June 2021
- Preceded by: Andrea Eder-Gitschthaler
- Succeeded by: Peter Raggl

Personal details
- Born: 27 September 1962 (age 63) Graz, Austria
- Party: Austrian People's Party (ÖVP)
- Education: University of Graz; University of California, Los Angeles

Christian Buchmann (born September 27, 1962 in Graz) is an Austrian politician (Austrian People's Party) and Member of the Styrian Parliament. He was the President of the Austrian Federal Council from 1 January 2021 to 30 June 2021.

== Biography ==
Buchmann sat his Abitur at the Bundesgymnasium Carnerigasse Graz in 1981, followed by military service. He studied business administration at the University of Graz and at the University of California, Los Angeles (UCLA). In 1998 he received a magister degree in Social and Economic Sciences.

Christian Buchmann started his career in 1982 as a secretary of the Junge ÖVP of Styria. Between 1988 and 1993 he worked as a managing director for trade at the chamber of economics Styria. From 1994 to 2003 he was the manager of the founder services at the chamber of economics Styria. Between 2002 and 2003 he also was managing director of the section 'information+consulting' in the chamber of economics Styria. In 2003, Buchmann became city councillor for economics, science and culture in Graz, and between 2005 and 2017 he was Member of the Styrian Government in charge of economy, innovation and finances.

Between 1987 and 1992 Buchmann was chairman of the Junge ÖVP Graz and from 1990 to 1993 financial consultant. From 1998 up to 2003 he worked as deputy chairman at the town council of Graz. In 2004 he became chairman of the alliance for economics Graz, as which he functioned until 2008. Since 2007 Christian Buchmann is vice chairman of the Austrian People's Party and since 2008 chairman of the alliance for economics Styria.

In 2017 Buchmann lost his doctoral degree awarded by the University of Graz in 2000 due to plagiarism in his doctoral thesis and as a consequence stepped down as a Member of the Styrian Government.
