= Peter Samt =

Austrian politician (born 1957)

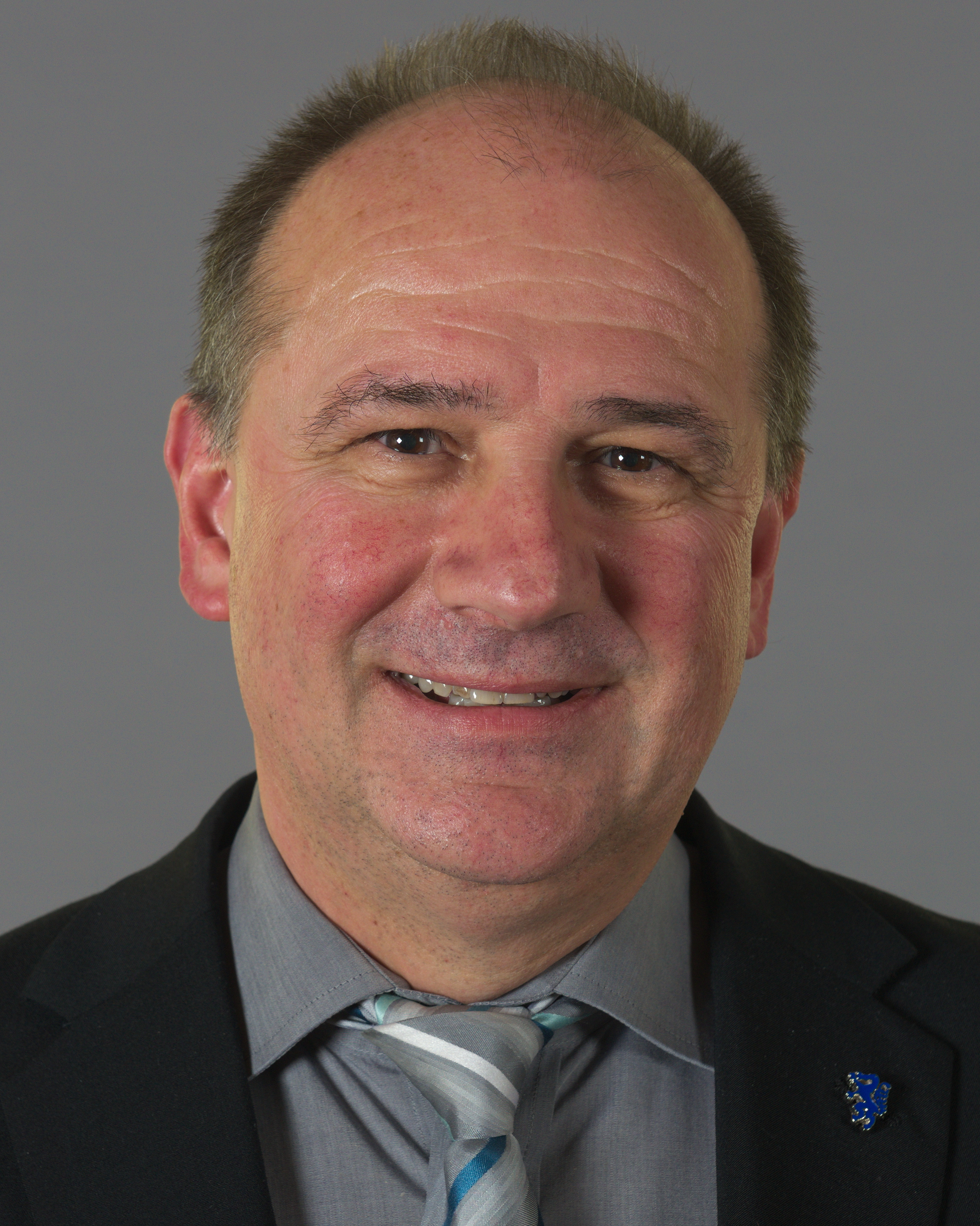
- Samt in 2017

President of the Federal Council
- In office 1 July 2025 – 31 December 2025
- Preceded by: Andrea Eder-Gitschthaler
- Succeeded by: Markus Stotter

Member of the Federal Council
- Incumbent
- Assumed office 16 June 2015

Personal details
- Born: 14 June 1957 (age 68) Graz, Styria, Austria
- Party: Freedom Party of Austria

Peter Samt (born 14 June 1957) is an Austrian politician who has been a Member of the Federal Council for the Freedom Party of Austria (FPÖ) since 2015.
