= Markus Stotter =

Austrian politician (born 1990)

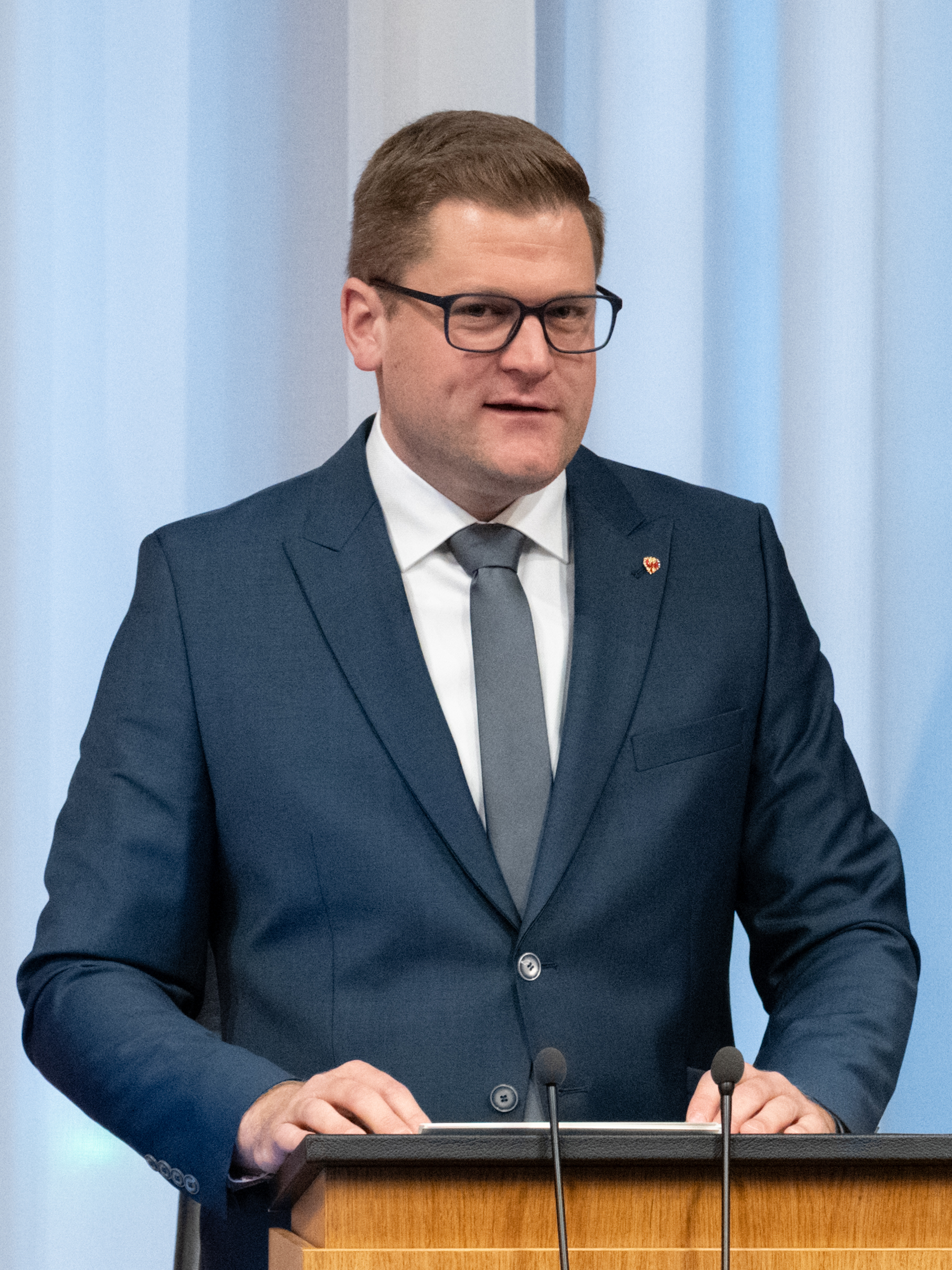
- Stotter in 2026

President of the Federal Council
- In office 1 January 2026 – 30 June 2026
- Preceded by: Peter Samt
- Succeeded by: Christine Schwarz-Fuchs

Personal details
- Born: 22 November 1990 (age 35)
- Party: People's Party

Markus Stotter (born 22 November 1990) is an Austrian politician. He has been a member of the Federal Council since 2022, and served as president of the Council in the first half of 2026. He has served as mayor of Oberlienz since 2021.
