= Helene Tschitschko =

Austrian politician (1908–1992)

Member of the Parliament
- In office 30 April 1964 – 30 June 1974

Personal details
- Born: 10 January 1908 Timenitz, Carinthia
- Died: 1 August 1992 (aged 84) Klagenfurt, Austria
- Party: Social Democratic Party

Helene Tschitschko (1908–1992) was an Austrian social democrat politician who was a member of the Parliament for ten years between 1964 and 1974.

== Biography ==
Tschitschko was born in Timenitz, Carinthia, on 10 January 1908. She was educated at the adult training center and worked at a factory. In 1953 she became a member of the municipal council of Klagenfurt. In 1960 she began to work as a board member of the Klagenfurt consumer cooperative. She served as the chair of the Socialist Women of Carinthia.

She was elected to the Parliament for the Social Democratic Party on 30 April 1964. In 1965 Tschitschko also served as the president of the Federal Council. She served at the Austrian Parliament until 30 June 1974.

Tschitschko died in Klagenfurt on 1 August 1992.
