= Hans Riemer (Austrian politician) =

Austrian politician

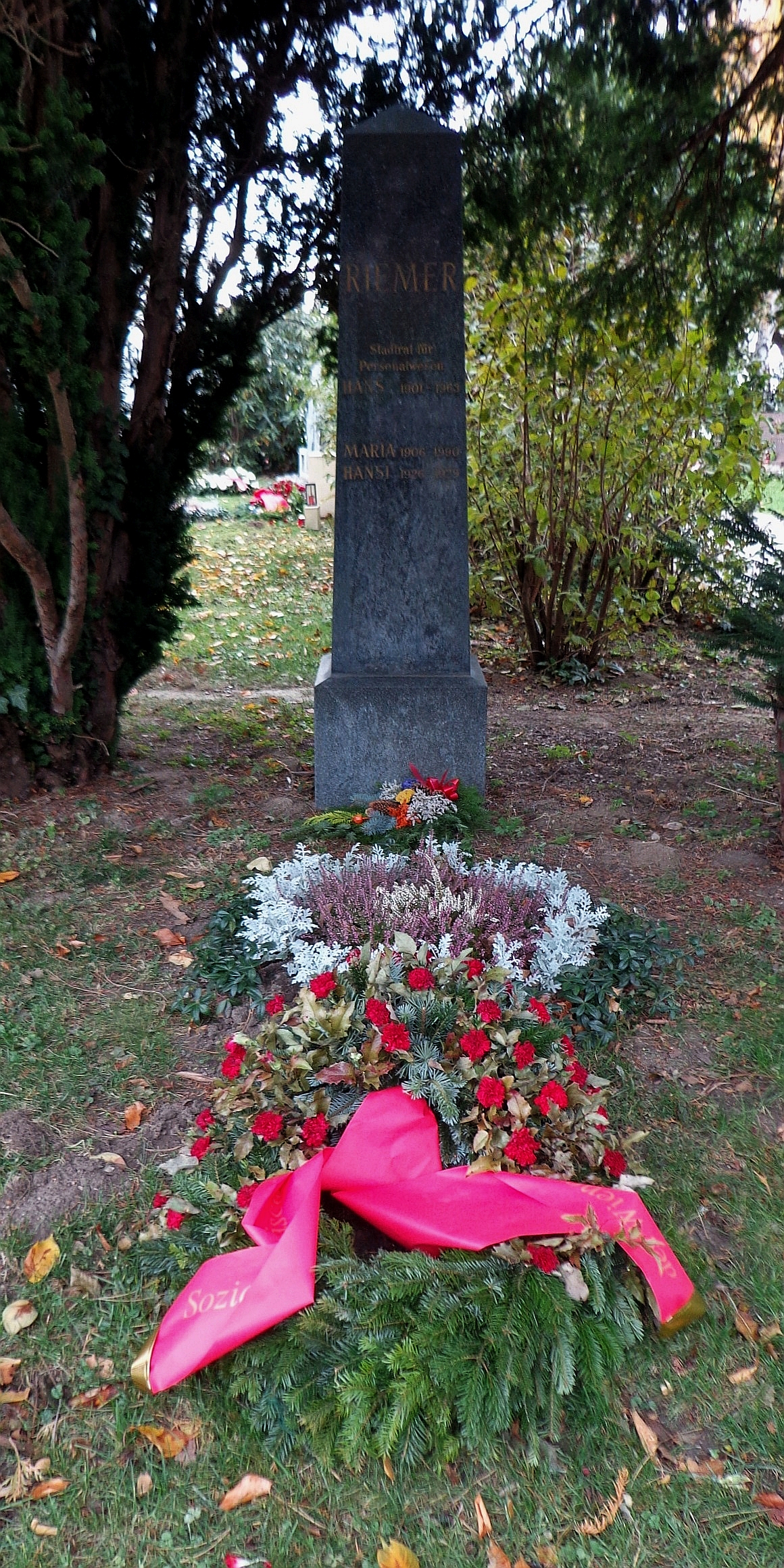
- Riemer's grave in the Vienna Central Cemetery

21st President of the Federal Council of Austria (2nd republic)
- In office 1 January 1955 – 30 June 1955
- Preceded by: Adolf Vögel
- Succeeded by: Anton Frisch

Bundesrat member
- In office 5 December 1949 – 5 July 1956

Personal details
- Born: 2 August 1901 Steyr, Austria
- Died: 26 December 1963 (aged 62) Vienna, Austria
- Resting place: Vienna Central Cemetery
- Party: Social Democratic Party of Austria
- Occupation: Politician; Author

Hans Riemer (2 August 1901 – 26 December 1963) was an Austrian politician of the Social Democratic Party of Austria (SPÖ). From 1949 to 1956 he was a member of the Bundesrat and from 1956 to 1963 a member of the city council of Vienna.

== Background ==
Riemer was born in Steyr, the son of a craftsman. He attended school in Vienna and completed a commercial apprenticeship. In 1918 he joined the Socialist Workers Youth, rose to local group chairman and was from 1922 to 1926 chairman of the Vienna State organization. In 1922, Josef Luitpold Stern brought him to the Socialist Education Center, where he built the department of photography and film and led it until 1932. Between 1932 and 1934, Riemer worked as a secretary of the Social Democratic municipal council and the Austrian Town Covenant (Österreichischer Städtebund). Riemer also worked as an editor of the paper "Österreichische Gemeinde-Zeitung".

After the prohibition of the Social Democratic Party, Riemer worked between 1934 and 1943 as an official at the Wiener Städtische Versicherung, an insurance company. He was subsequently drafted to military service, and returned in 1945 from a short American captivity. He became press secretary of the city of Vienna, and wrote a brochure Ewiges Wien in that capacity. In 1948, he was also appointed secretary of the Austrian Town Covenant again. Riemer, who held this office until 1957, was also a member of the Bundesrat between 5 December 1949 and 5 July 1956. He served as president between 1 January 1955 and 20 June 1955.

On 13 April 1956, Riemer took on the role of the municipal council for personnel affairs, administrative and operational reform in the administration of Franz Jonas. Riemer led the office in the following government, until he died in office in Vienna in 1963. In addition, Riemer was from 11 December 1959 until his death a member of the Vienna city council (Stadtrat) and a member of the Vienna municipal council (Gemeinderat).

Riemer was buried in a grave of honor (German: Ehrengrab) in the Vienna Central Cemetery (Group 14C, No. 25).

== Publications ==
Riemer's books appeared in the Verlag für Jugend und Volk, in Vienna.

- Ewiges Wien: eine komunalpolitische skizze [Eternal Vienna: a Communal Political Eternal Vienna: A Comunal Political Sketch] (in German). Verlag für Jugend und Volk. 1945. "mit 63 Abbildungen und 3 Tabellen. Geleitwort von Bürgermeister General A.D. Theodor Körner"
- Riemer, Hans (1947). Perle Wien: Ein Bilderbuch aus Wiens schlimmsten Tagen [This pearl Vienna: A picture book from Vienna's worst days] (in German). Translated by de Ferro, Patricia.
- Wien dankt seinen Helfern, Eine Darstellung der Auslandshilfe im 1. Jahre ihrer Wirksamkeit [Vienna thanks its helpers, A representation of foreign aid] (in German). 1947.
- Wien baut auf: 2 Jahre Wiederaufbau [Vienna builds up: 2 years of reconstruction] (in German). 1947.
- Die Finanzlage der österreichischen Gemeinden, Referat auf dem 3. Gewerkschaftstag der Gemeindebediensteten [The financial situation of the Austrian municipalities, presentation at the 3rd trade union day of the municipal employees] (in German). 9 February 1955.
