= Herbert Schambeck =

Austrian legal scholar and politician (1934–2023)

Member of the Federal Council of Austria
- In office 20 November 1969 – 30 June 1997

Personal details
- Born: 12 July 1934 Baden bei Wien, Lower Austria, Austria
- Died: 2 October 2023 (aged 89)
- Party: ÖVP
- Education: University of Vienna
- Occupation: Legal scholar

Herbert Schambeck (12 July 1934 – 2 October 2023) was an Austrian legal scholar and politician. A member of the Austrian People's Party, he served in the Federal Council from 1969 to 1997.

Schambeck died on 2 October 2023, at the age of 89.
