= Margit Göll =

Austrian politician (born 1964)

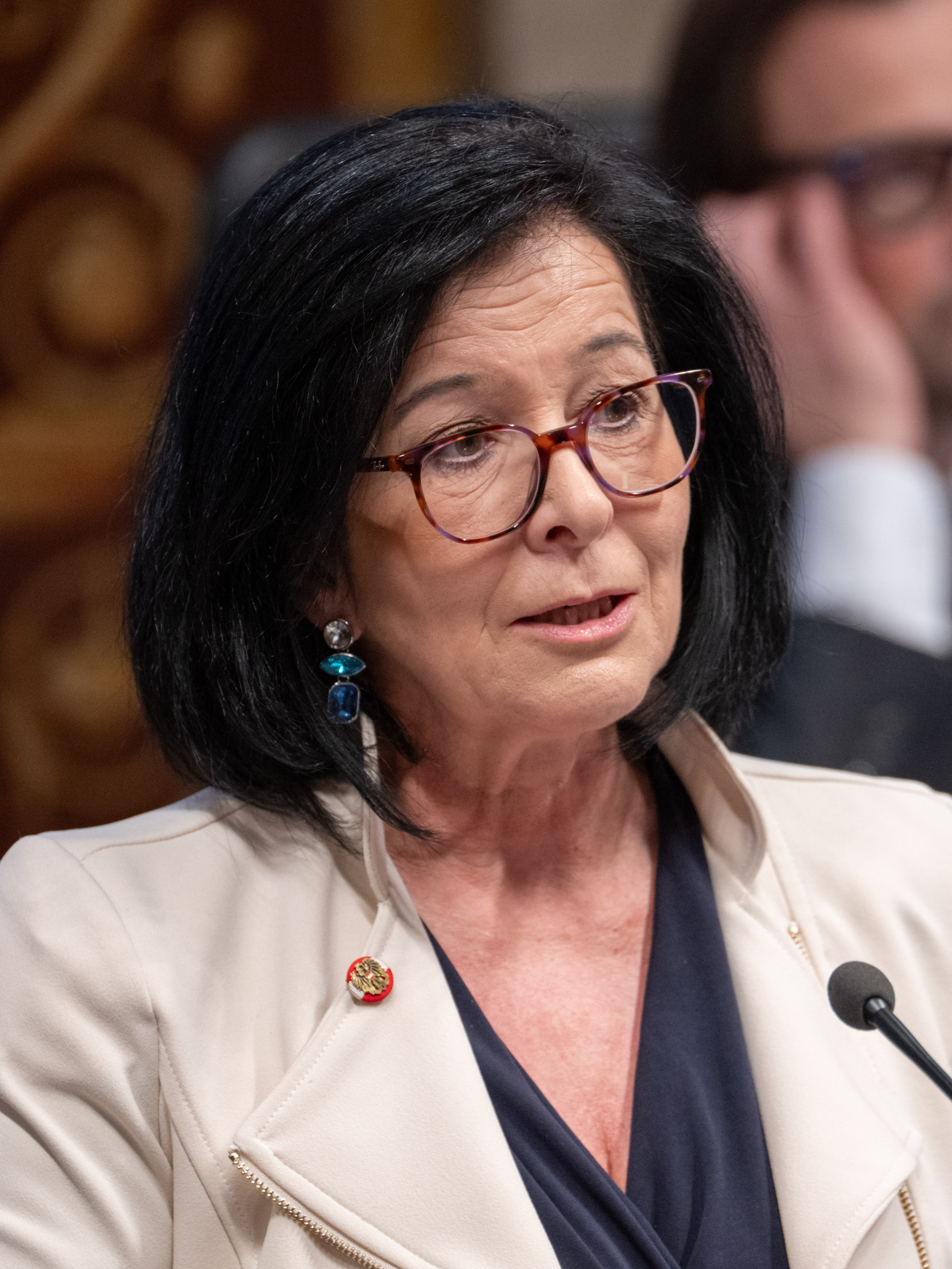
- Göll in 2026

President of the Federal Council of Austria
- In office 1 January 2024 – 30 June 2024
- Preceded by: Claudia Arpa
- Succeeded by: Franz Ebner

Member of the Landtag of Lower Austria
- In office 2016–2023

Personal details
- Born: 16 August 1964 (age 61) Gmünd, Lower Austria, Austria
- Party: Austrian People's Party (ÖVP)

Margit Göll (née Haumer; born 16 August 1964) is an Austrian politician (Austrian People's Party). From 2016 to March 2023, she was a member of the Landtag of Lower Austria, and since 23 March 2023, she has been a member of the Federal Council delegated by the state parliament. In the first half of 2024, Göll held the office of President of the Federal Council.

== Professional career ==
After primary and secondary school, Göll attended the Federal Training Institute for Kindergarten Education from 1978 to 1982. She then worked at the Großschönau kindergarten for 22 years, starting in 1993 as head of the kindergarten. From 2015 to 2016 she was a kindergarten inspector for the districts of Gmünd, Zwettl and Waidhofen; this position was suspended when she entered the state parliament.

== Political career ==
From 2005 to 2010, Göll was a local councilor in Moorbad Harbach, where she has been mayor since 7 April 2010. Since 2010 she has also been on the regional board of the Austrian Workers' Association ÖAAB, since 2012 she has been the district chairwoman of the ÖVP Women, and since 2014 chairwoman of the ÖVP community association in the Gmünd District.

On 28 January 2016, Göll succeeded Johann Hofbauer in the 18th Legislative period sworn in as a member of the Landtag of Lower Austria. At the beginning of 2019, she was elected district chairwoman of the Lower Austrian Employees' Association (NÖAAB) in the Gmünd district. Göll is a member of the extended board of the Waldviertel regional association.

In the 2023 state elections in Lower Austria, Göll ran as the ÖVP's top candidate in the Gmünd District. After the election she changed her position at the beginning of the 20th Legislative period in the Federal Council, where she was elected vice president in the second half of 2023 and took over the chairmanship of the state chamber as President of the Federal Council in the first half of 2024.

== Personal life ==
Göll is married and has a son.
