= Andrea Eder-Gitschthaler =

Austrian politician

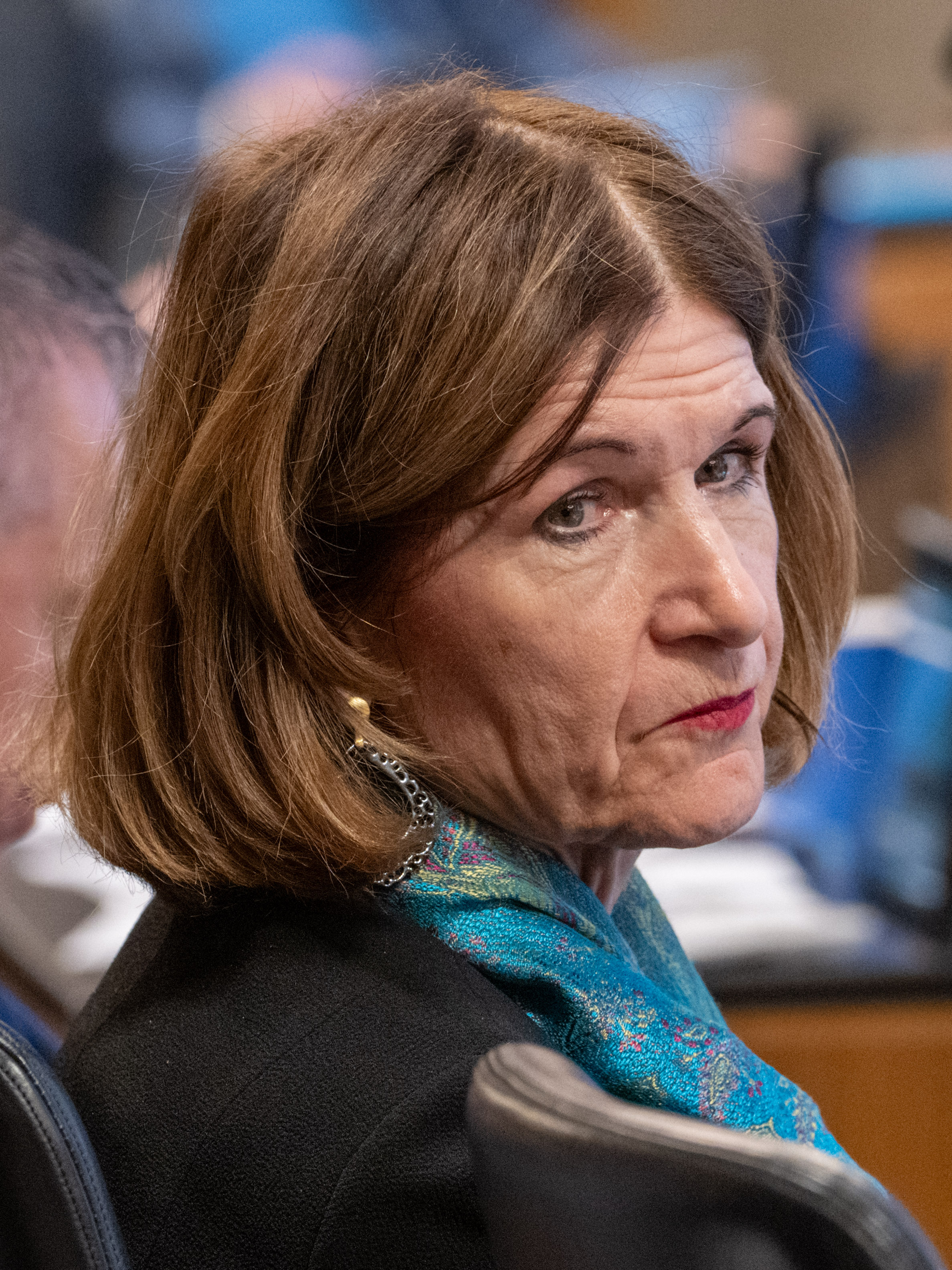
- Eder-Gitschthaler in 2026

President of the Federal Council
- In office 1 January 2025 – 30 June 2025
- Preceded by: Franz Huber
- Succeeded by: Peter Samt
- In office 1 July 2020 – 31 December 2020
- Preceded by: Robert Seeber
- Succeeded by: Christian Buchmann

Vice President of the Federal Council
- In office 14 January 2020 – 30 June 2020

Member of the Federal Council
- Incumbent
- Assumed office 1 October 2017
- Preceded by: Josef Saller

Member of the National Council of Austria
- In office 30 October 2006 – 27 October 2008

Personal details
- Born: 13 September 1961 (age 64) Vöcklabruck, Upper Austria, Austria
- Party: Austrian People's Party (ÖVP)

Andrea Eder-Gitschthaler is an Austrian politician of the Austrian People's Party (ÖVP) who serves as a member of the Federal Council of Austria. She previously served as President of the Federal Council in the first half of 2025 and the second half of 2020. Previously, she served as a member of the National Council from 2006 to 2008. In 2019, she became the first woman to chair the parliamentary group of the People's Party.

== Early life and education ==
Eder-Gitschthaler was born in the town of Vöcklabruck in 1961. She attended local schools and graduated from the law faculty of the University of Salzburg in 1984.

== Early career ==
After her legal training, Eder-Gitschthaler worked for the Asset Management Association, followed by an advertising agency. In 1991, she became the head of marketing for the Salzburg office of Uniqa Insurance Group.

== Political career ==
Eder-Gitschthaler became active in politics as a member of the municipal council of Wals-Siezenheim in 1999 and served on that body until 2014. In 2006, she was elected to the National Council, the lower house of the Parliament of Austria. In 2008, the Austrian People's Party suffered one of its worst results ever in the election and she was denied re-election to the National Council.

In 2017, Eder-Gitschthaler was elected to the Federal Council by the Landtag of Salzburg. The People's Party named her as its parliamentary group leader in 2019, making her the first woman to hold the post. On 19 December 2019, she was elected as the Second Vice President of the Federal Council, placing her next in line to assume the rotating council presidency. On 1 July 2020, Eder-Gitschthaler took over as President of the Federal Council.

In addition to her role in parliament, Eder-Gitschthaler has been serving as a member of the Austrian delegation to the Parliamentary Assembly of the Council of Europe since 2020. In the Assembly, she is a member of the Committee on Equality and Non-Discrimination. In this capacity, she authored a 2025 report on age-based discrimination against older persons.
