= Martin Strimitzer =

Austrian politician (1928–2021)

President of the Federal Council of Austria
- In office 1 January 1990 – 30 June 1990
- Preceded by: Anton Nigl
- Succeeded by: Georg Ludescher

Member of the Federal Council of Austria
- In office 1982–1992

Personal details
- Born: 10 November 1928 Stein, Dellach im Drautal, Austria
- Died: 10 December 2021 (aged 93)
- Party: ÖVP

Martin Strimitzer (10 November 1928 – 10 December 2021) was an Austrian politician. A member of the Austrian People's Party, he served in the Federal Council from 1982 to 1992 and was its president from January to June 1990. He died on 10 December 2021, at the age of 93.
