= Federal Assembly (Austria) =

Joint session of the legislature

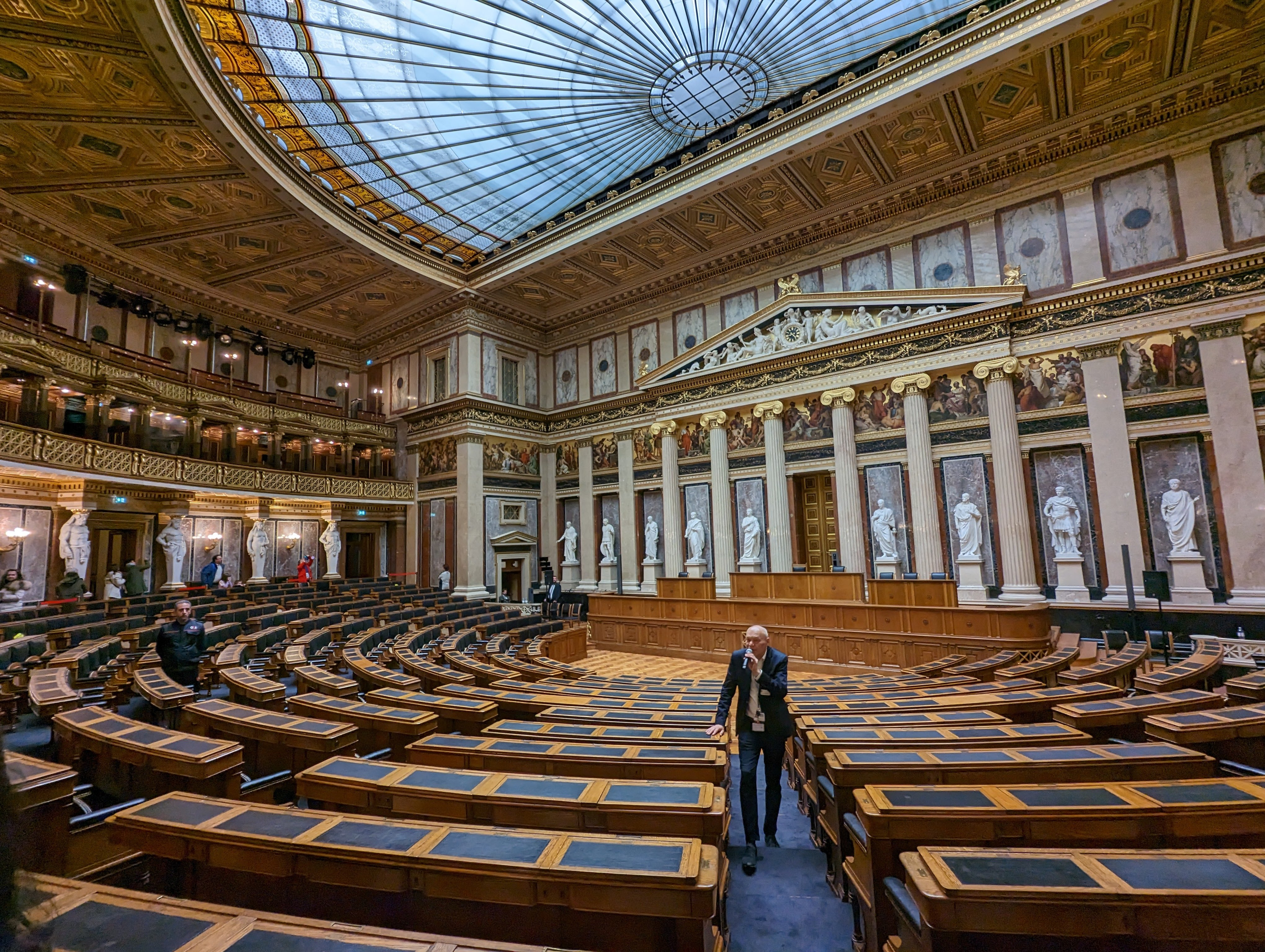
Assembly hall of the former Imperial Council House of Representatives, venue of the Federal Assembly

The Federal Assembly (German: Bundesversammlung) is the name given to a formal joint session of the two houses of the bicameral Austrian Parliament, the National Council and the Federal Council. It is chaired by the presidents of the two parliamentary chambers taking turns presiding over its sessions.

According to the Federal Constitutional Law, the Federal Assembly does not function as a legislative body; the two chambers enact legislation, and even amend the constitution, as strictly separate entities. Since 1945, the assembly has only met to swear the elected President of Austria into office.

== Tasks ==
While during the pre-war First Austrian Republic, the Assembly convened to elect the Austrian president, a direct election was implemented by a 1929 amendment. This provision however did not become effective until 1951, when Theodor Körner became the first president directly elected by the Austrian people. Since then, the principal responsibility is to convene for the ceremonial swearing-in of the president. It recently met at the inauguration of Alexander Van der Bellen's second term as Austrian President on 26 January 2023.

In theory, the Federal Assembly also functions as an instrument of checks and balances; upon request by a two-thirds majority of the National Council, it may impeach the president before the Constitutional Court, or upon request by a two-thirds majority in the National Council decide on a referendum to have the president removed from office. The assent of the Assembly would also be required for the president's immunity against criminal prosecution to be withdrawn. Furthermore, it is also responsible for declaring war. Neither of these powers, however, has so far been exercised.
