= Sonja Zwazl =

Austrian politician

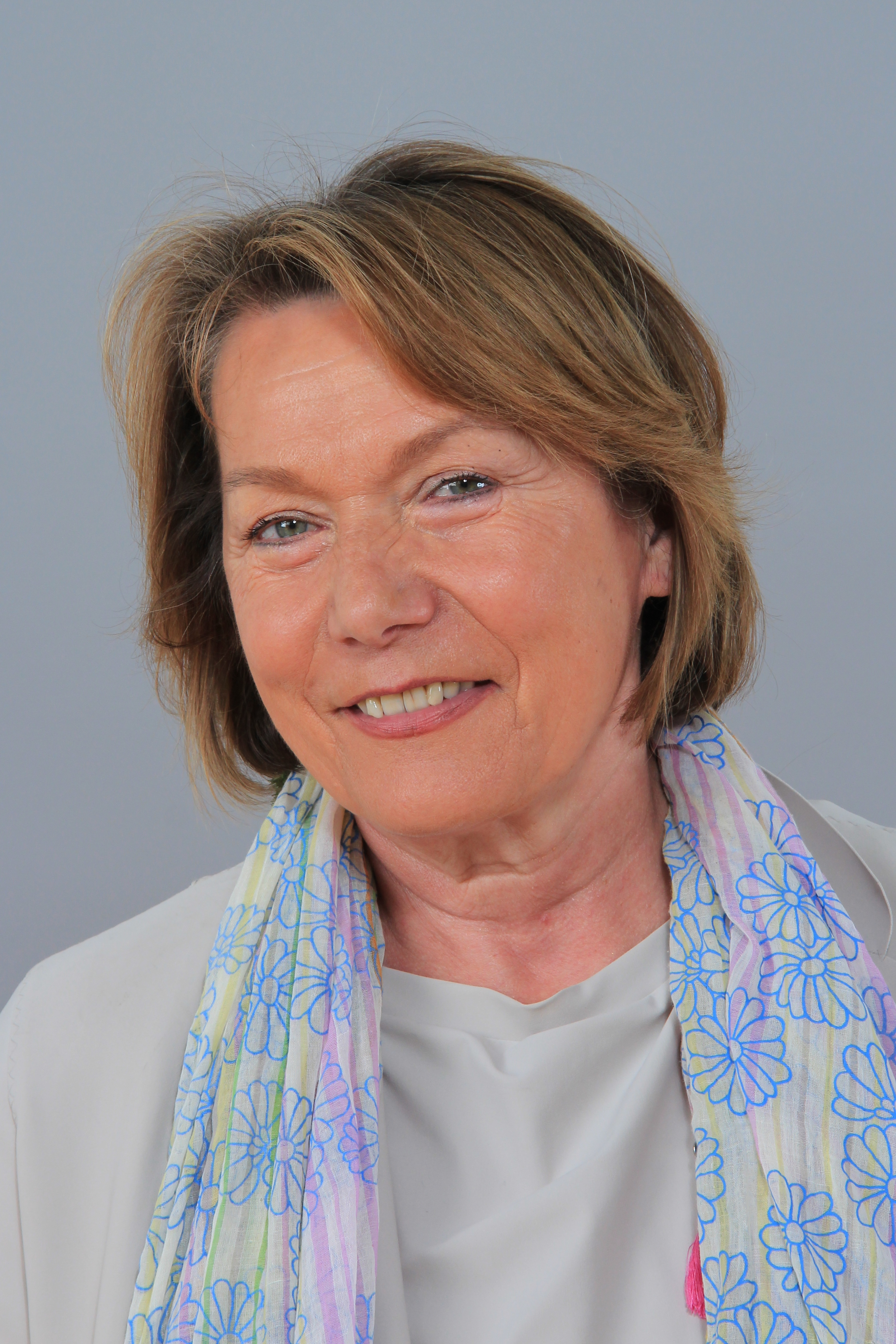
- Zwazl in 2013

President of the Federal Council
- In office 1 January 2015 – 30 June 2015
- Preceded by: Ana Blatnik
- Succeeded by: Gottfried Kneifel

Personal details
- Born: 10 July 1946 (age 79) Weitra, Austria
- Party: People's Party

Sonja Zwazl (born 10 July 1946) is an Austrian politician of the Volkspartei (ÖVP). She was president of the Economic Chamber of Lower Austria from 1999 to 2020 and a member of the Bundesrat from 2003 to 2023.

== Life and career ==
After visiting a business school from 1960 to 1962, she studied at the Fototechnikum Agfa in Munich from 1971 to 1973 and founded a private company in 1969.

She was a member of the Bundesrat from April 2003 to March 2023 and was president of the Economic Chamber of Lower Austria from 1999 to 2020 (see also: Austrian Economic Chamber), which she is most known for. Her successor Wolfgang Ecker thanked her for "years of successful work and incomparable commitment". Additionally, for short periods of time, she was the president (from January to June 2015) and vice-president (January to June 2022) of the Bundesrat.

=== Private Life ===
She is divorced and has children.

== Honours ==
- 1996: The honorary title Kommerzialrat (lit. Councillor of Commerce)
- 2006: Decoration of Honor for Services to the Province of Lower Austria

== Controversy ==
She was criticized for her expensive farewell party in 2020, costing roughly 54.000 euros, especially because it took place during a time where many small businesses were suffering due to COVID-19.
