= Gregor Hammerl =

Austrian politician (1942–2023)

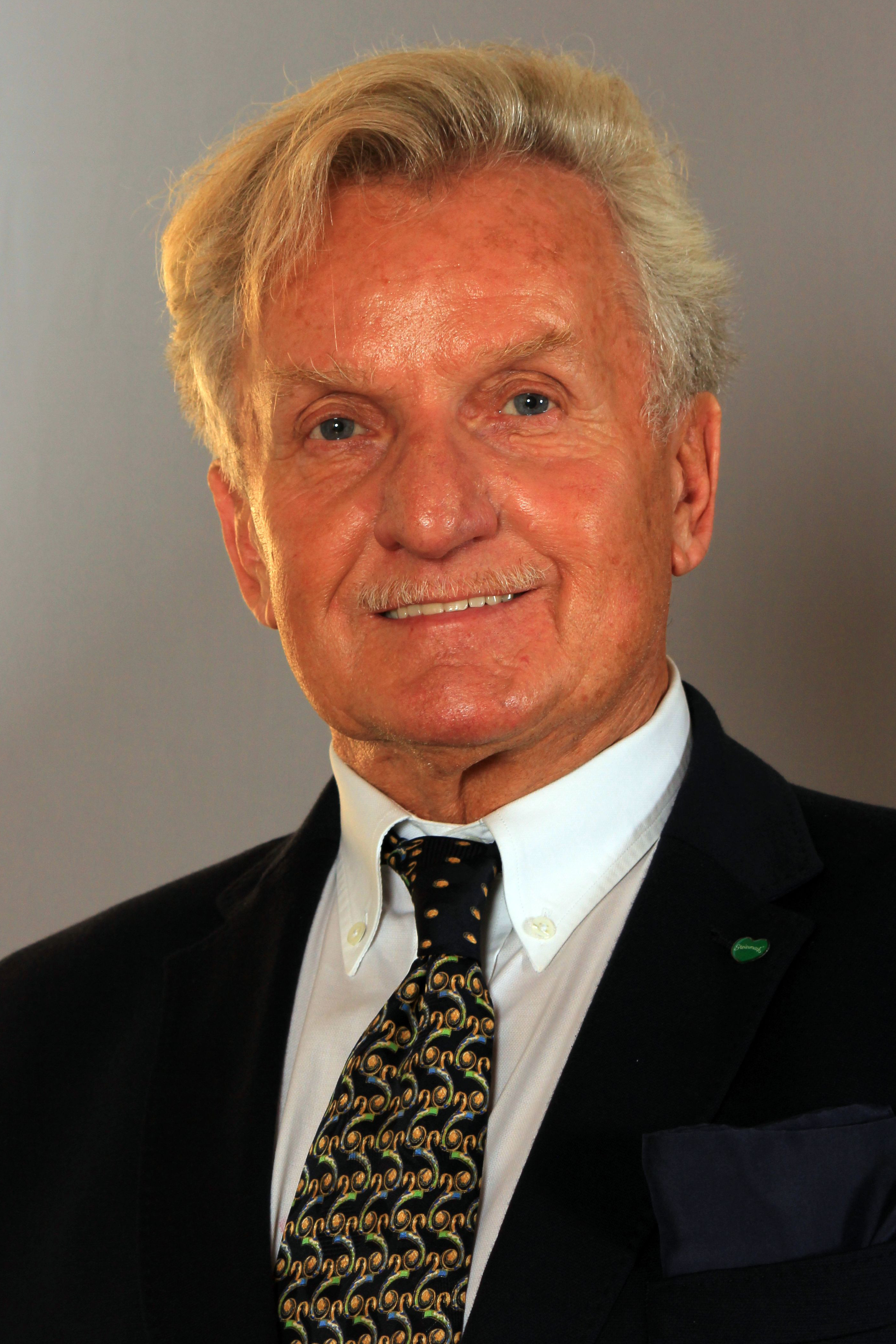

Gregor Hammerl (8 June 1942 – 1 November 2023) was an Austrian politician who was President of the Federal Council of Austria in 2012.

== Life and career ==
Gregor Hammerl was born on 8 April 1942. From 1986 to 1987, Hammerl was an organization officer for the Austrian People's Party in Graz. The following year, he became a member of the council in Graz and remained one until 2000. Hammerl became Executive Chairman of the Austrian People's Party in Graz and served in that capacity until 1999. He then served as Deputy Chairman from 2000 to 2004. In 2010, Hammerl joined the Federal Council. He became President of the Federal Council in 2012. Hammerl died on 1 November 2023, at the age of 81.
