= Oberlienz =

- Municipality
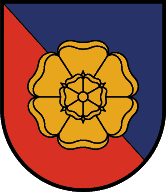
- Coat of arms

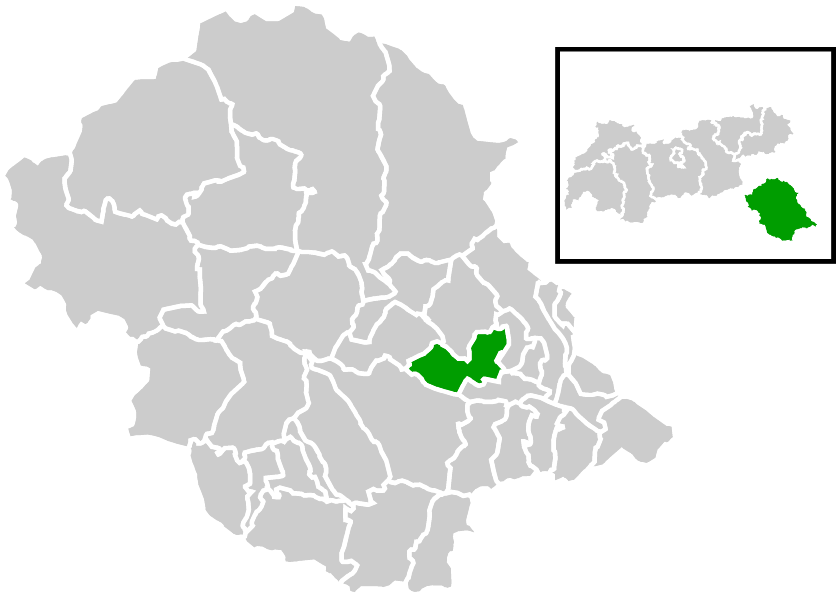
- Location within Lienz district

- Location within Austria
- Coordinates: 46°50′38″N 12°43′48″E
- Country: Austria
- State: Tyrol
- District: Lienz

Government
  - Mayor: Markus Stotter

Area
  - Total: 33.82 km^{2} (13.06 sq mi)
- Elevation: 756 m (2,480 ft)

Population (2021)
  - Total: 1,458
  - Density: 43.11/km^{2} (111.7/sq mi)
- Time zone: UTC+1 (CET)
  - Summer (DST): UTC+2 (CEST)
- Postal code: 9900
- Area code: 04852
- Vehicle registration: LZ
- Website: www.oberlienz.at

Oberlienz is a municipality in the district of Lienz in the Austrian state of Tyrol.

== Population ==
Historical population
Year	Pop.	±%
1869	968	—
1880	969	+0.1%
1890	948	−2.2%
1900	904	−4.6%
1910	919	+1.7%
1923	879	−4.4%
1934	1,008	+14.7%
1939	1,071	+6.2%
1951	1,031	−3.7%
1961	1,084	+5.1%
1971	1,222	+12.7%
1981	1,302	+6.5%
1991	1,326	+1.8%
2001	1,438	+8.4%
2009	1,435	−0.2%
