= Claudia Arpa =

Austrian politician (born 1967)

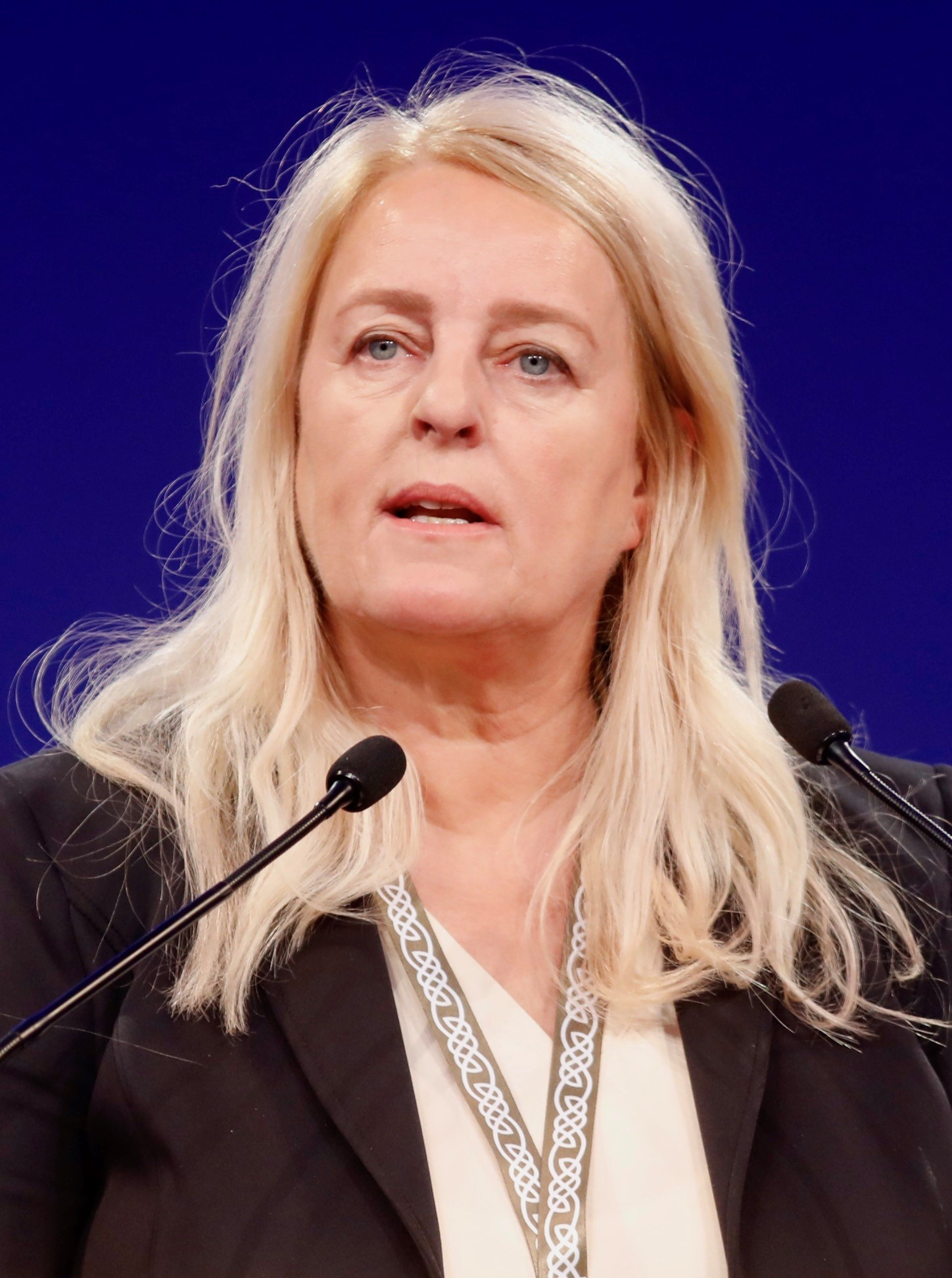
- Arpa in 2023

President of the Federal Council
- In office 1 July 2023 – 31 December 2023
- Preceded by: Günter Kovacs
- Succeeded by: Margit Göll

Personal details
- Born: 12 November 1967 (age 58) Feldkirchen in Kärnten, Austria
- Party: Social Democratic Party (SPÖ)
- Education: University of Graz; Graz University of Technology

Claudia Arpa (born 12 November 1967) is an Austrian politician who was President of the country's Federal Council from 1 July 2023 to 31 December 2023.

== Early life and education ==
Arpa was born on 12 November 1967 in Waiern in Carinthia, the third of four children. She attended Gnesau elementary school and Feldkirchen secondary school, graduating in 1982. She undertook further studies in economics in Villach. In 1993, she graduated with teaching degrees in psychology, geography and economics from Karl Franzens University in Graz. She has completed postgraduate studies in environmental protection at the Technical University of Graz and in social management at the Institute for Education in the Health Service.

== Career ==
Arpa worked in management at an Integration Service and the Wolfsburg State Welfare Association, before becoming managing director of the Lavanttal Women's Shelter in 2019. She also ran her own language learning company.

Arpa has been involved in various committees of the Social Democratic Party of Austria. From 2015, she was a member of the municipal council of Frantschach-Sankt Gertraud and on 21 March 2021 she was elected Vice Mayor of the town. In April 2018, she was elected to the Carinthian State Parliament. In November 2021, she was unanimously elected Chair of SPO women in Wolfsberg District.

Arpa became a member of the Federal Council in April 2023, delegated by the Carinthian state parliament, and was elected President on 1 July 2023.

== Personal life ==
Arpa is married and has three daughters.
