= Korinna Schumann =

Austrian politician

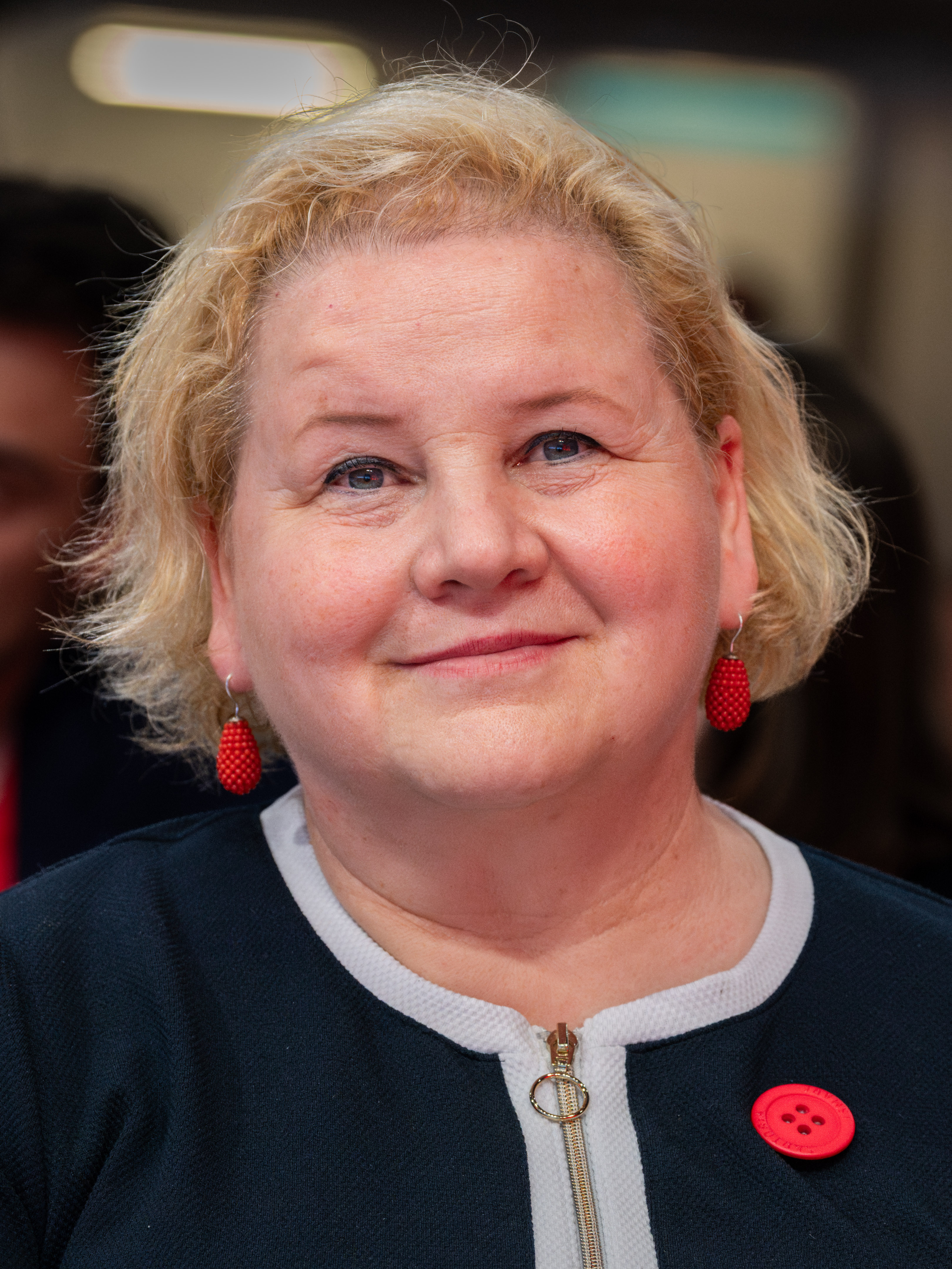
- Schumann in 2026

Minister of Labour, Social Affairs, Health, Care and Consumer Protection
- Incumbent
- Assumed office 3 March 2025
- Chancellor: Christian Stocker
- Preceded by: Johannes Rauch

President of the Federal Council
- In office 1 July 2022 – 31 December 2022
- Preceded by: Christine Schwarz-Fuchs
- Succeeded by: Günter Kovacs

Personal details
- Born: 10 April 1966 (age 60) Vienna, Austria
- Party: Social Democratic Party (SPÖ)

Korinna Schumann (born 1966 in Vienna) is an Austrian Social Democratic politician and union leader who has served as Minister of Labour, Social Affairs, Health, Care and Consumer Protection in the Stocker government since 2025. She previously served a term as President of the Federal Council from 1 July to 31 December 2022. Since 2018, she has been the Women's Chair and of Vice President the Austrian Trade Union Federation (ÖGB), as well as a member of the Federal Council.

== Career ==
Korinna Schumann was born in Vienna on 10 April 1966, and graduated from the Sperlgymnasium in the 2nd district. She has worked at Austria’s Ministry of Social Affairs since 1989, where she began her union involvement in 1990 as a staff representative. Since 2004, she has chaired both the workplace union committee and the staff committee within the ministry.

She has been active in the Union of Public Sector Employees (GÖD) since 1995, holding leadership roles in the division for Labor, Social Affairs, and Health. In 2006, she became a board member and deputy head of the women’s section. In 2007, she was elected to the national women's executive and the federal board of the Austrian Trade Union Federation (ÖGB). She has been a full ÖGB board member since 2013 and has also held leadership roles within the Social Democratic Party of Austria (SPÖ), including its national executive and women's organization since 2014.

On April 10, 2018, Schumann succeeded Renate Anderl as chair of the ÖGB women’s division. The following month, she also took over Anderl’s seat in Austria’s Federal Council (upper house of parliament), representing Vienna. In that role, she served on multiple committees, including those focused on labor, social affairs, health, youth, innovation, foreign affairs, and economic matters. On June 14, 2018, she was elected ÖGB Vice President, and was reelected in 2023.

Schumann became chair of the SPÖ's group in the Federal Council in 2019. She ran for national parliament in the 2019 election, placed 19th on the SPÖ’s federal list, and was elected to the leadership team of the SPÖ parliamentary group in October 2019.

On 2 April 2025, Schumann was sworn in by President Alexander Van der Bellen as Minister of Labour, Social Affairs, Health, Care and Consumer Protection in the Stocker government.
