= Gerd Klamt =

Austrian politician (1942–2024)

Member of the Federal Council of Austria
- In office 30 October 2000 – 30 March 2004

Personal details
- Born: 2 November 1942 Villach, Reichsgau Kärnten, Germany
- Died: 24 March 2024 (aged 81) Villach, Carinthia, Austria
- Party: FPÖ
- Education: Technologisches Gewerbemuseum
- Occupation: Engineer

Gerd Klamt (2 November 1942 – 24 March 2024) was an Austrian engineer and politician. A member of the Freedom Party of Austria, he served in the Federal Council from 2000 to 2004.

Klamt died in Villach on 24 March 2024, at the age of 81.
