= Inge Posch-Gruska =

Austrian politician (born 1962)

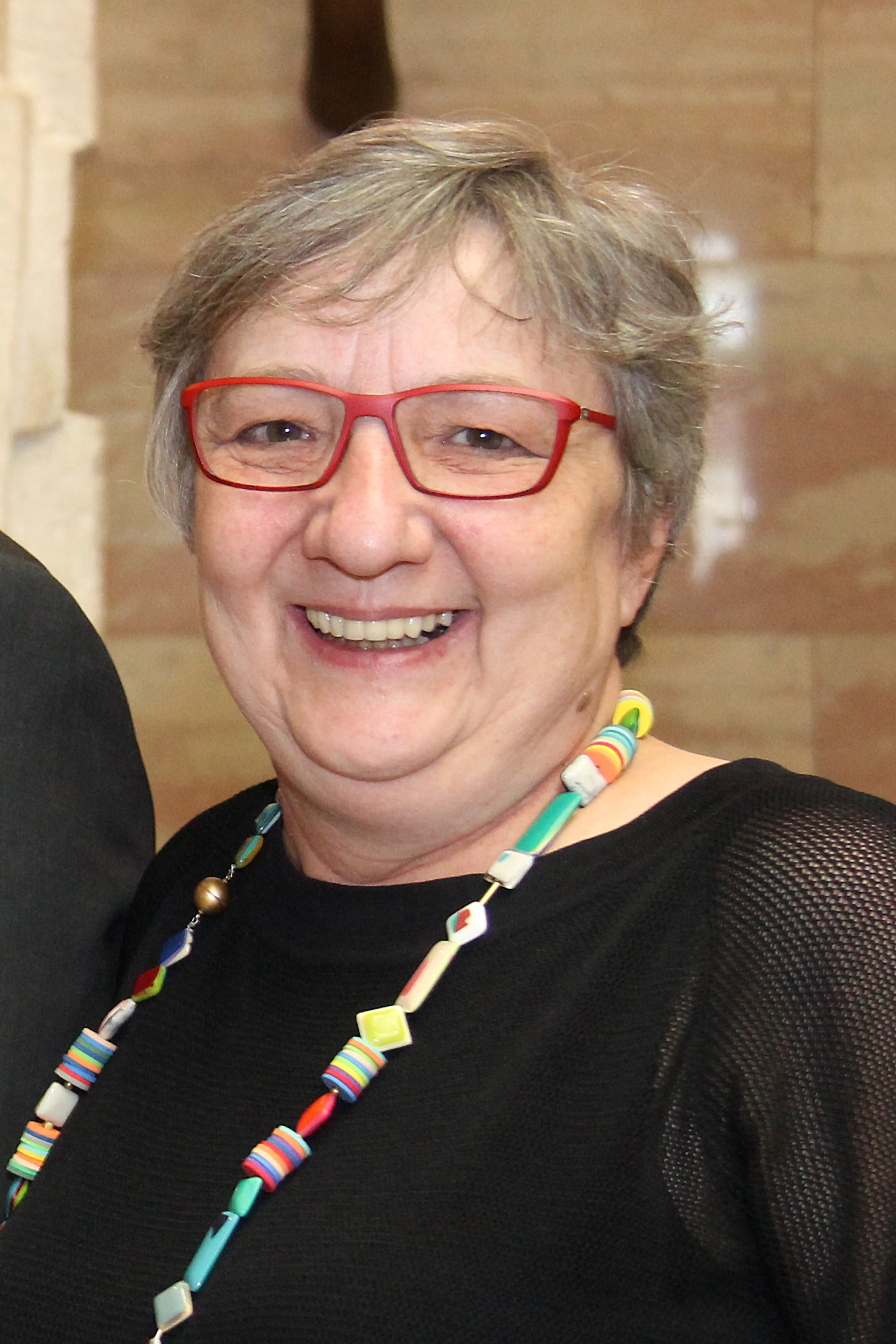

President of the Federal Council
- In office 1 July 2018 – 31 December 2018
- Vice President: Magnus Brunner; Ewald Lindinger
- Preceded by: Reinhard Todt
- Succeeded by: Ingo Appé

Member of the Federal Council from Burgenland
- Incumbent
- Assumed office 27 April 2001
- Affiliation: Social Democratic Party

Personal details
- Born: 16 May 1962 (age 63) Baden bei Wien, Austria
- Party: Social Democratic Party

Inge Posch-Gruska (born 16 May 1962) is an Austrian politician of the Social Democratic Party. She has been Mayor of Hirm since 2007 and was a member of the Landtag of Burgenland from 2005 to 2010. She has been serving as a member of the Federal Council since 2010 and since July 2018 as its President.
