= Olga Rudel-Zeynek =

Austrian politician (1871–1948)

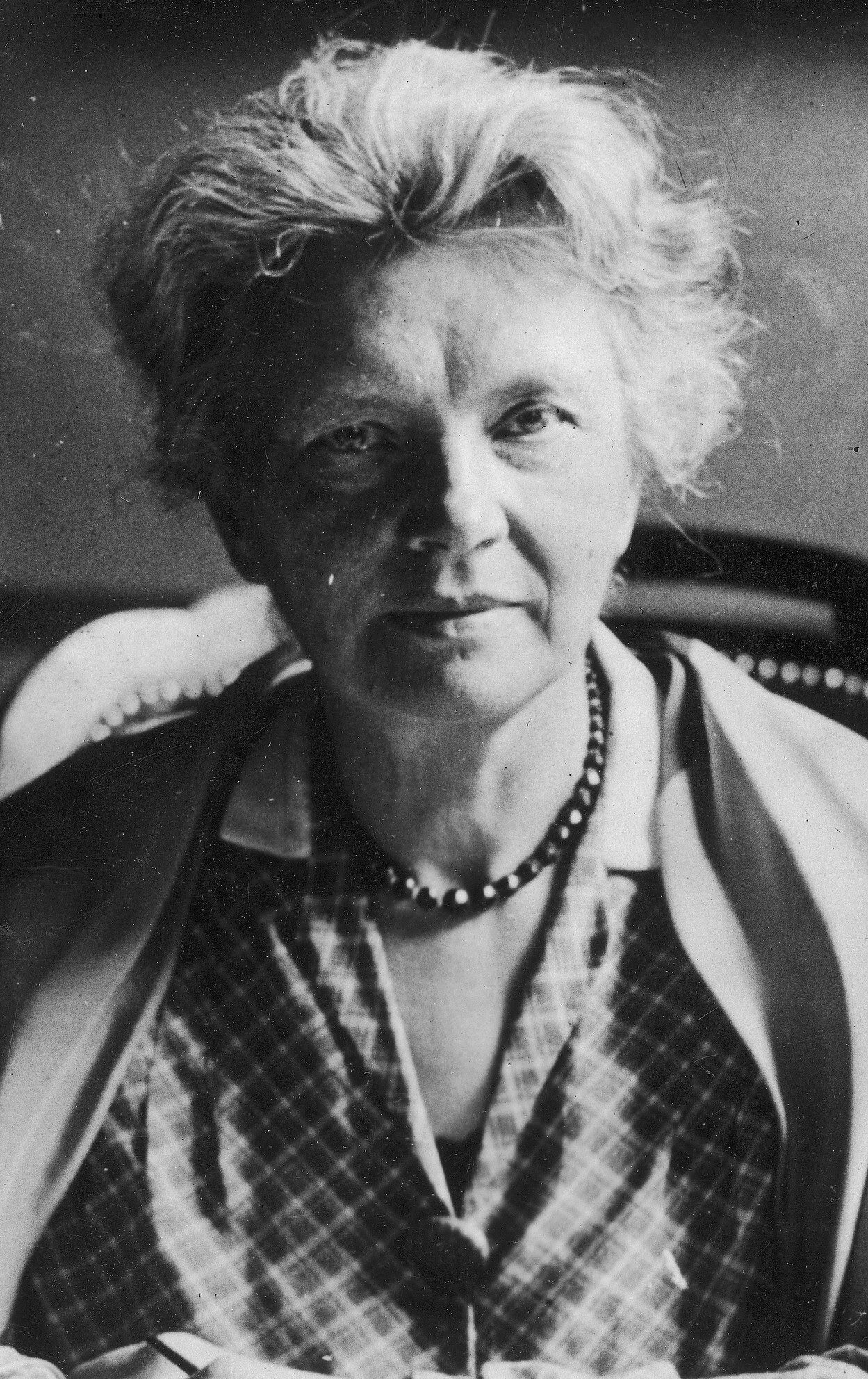

President of the Federal Council
- In office 1 June 1932 – 30 November 1932
- Preceded by: Franz Rehrl
- Succeeded by: Franz Stumpf
- In office 1 December 1927 – 31 May 1928
- Preceded by: Franz Rehrl
- Succeeded by: Richard Steidle

Personal details
- Born: 28 January 1871 Olomouc, Moravia, Austria-Hungary
- Died: 25 August 1948 (aged 77) Graz, Allied-occupied Austria
- Party: Christian Social Party (CS)

Olga Rudel-Zeynek (28 January 1871 – 25 August 1948), was an Austrian politician and journalist. She served as President of the Bundesrat in 1927–28 and 1932.

The Bundesrat, or Federal Council, is the representation of the States of Austria. She was a Member of the National Assembly in 1920–1927, of the Landtag of Steiermark and of the Bundesrat in 1927–1933, as well as a member of the leadership of the Christian Social Party.
