= Christine Schwarz-Fuchs =

Austrian politician (born 1974)

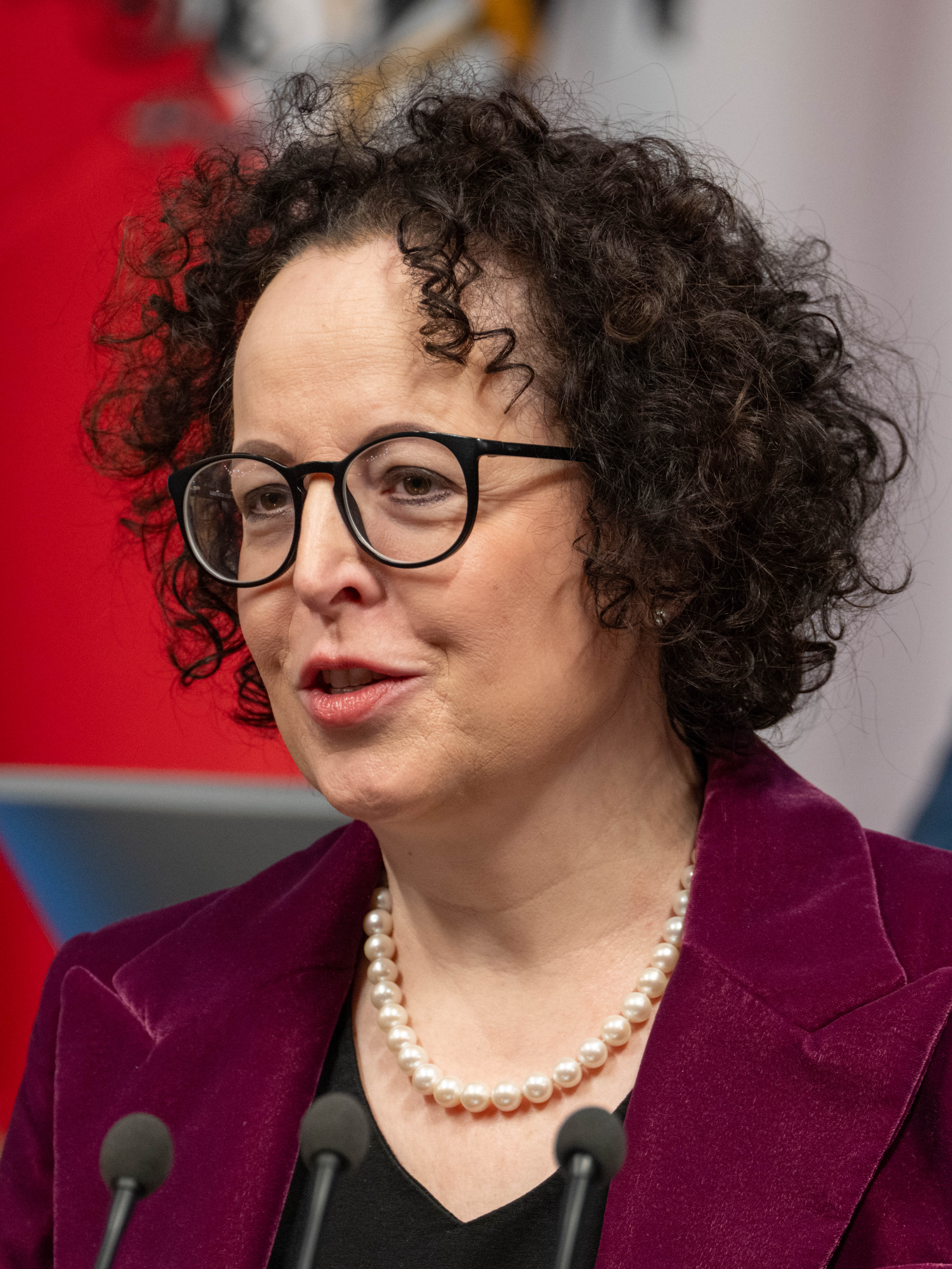
- Schwarz-Fuchs in 2026

President of the Federal Council
- Incumbent
- Assumed office 1 July 2026
- Preceded by: Markus Stotter
- In office 1 January 2022 – 30 June 2022
- Preceded by: Peter Raggl
- Succeeded by: Korinna Schumann

Personal details
- Born: 22 June 1974 (age 52) Bregenz, Austria
- Party: People's Party (ÖVP)
- Education: Vienna University of Economics and Business; University of New England

Christine Schwarz-Fuchs (née Schwarz; born 29 June 1974) is an Austrian politician from the Austrian People's Party.

She was elected President of the Federal Council on 1 January 2022.
