= Federal Council (Austria) =

Upper house of the Austrian Parliament

Federal Council Bundesrat

Type
- Type: Upper house of the Austrian Parliament

History
- Founded: 10 November 1920
- Preceded by: Constituent National Assembly

Leadership
- President: Christine Schwarz-Fuchs (ÖVP) since 1 July 2026

Structure
- Seats: 60
- Political groups: Government (41) ÖVP (22) SPÖ (18) NEOS (1) Opposition (19) FPÖ (16) Greens (3)

Elections
- Voting system: Appointment by State diets
- Last election: No direct election

Meeting place
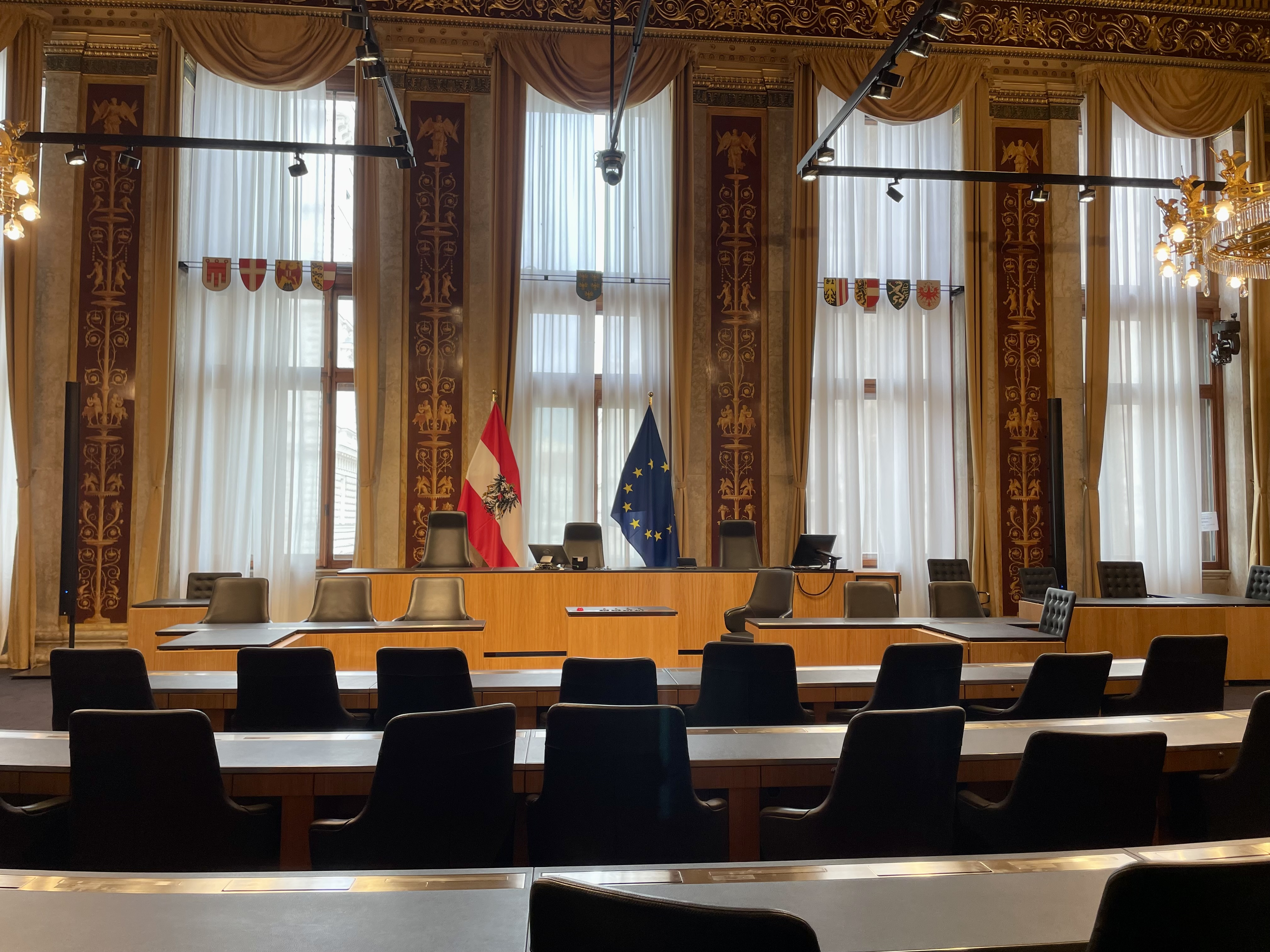
- Austrian Parliament Building, Vienna

Website
- parlament.gv.at

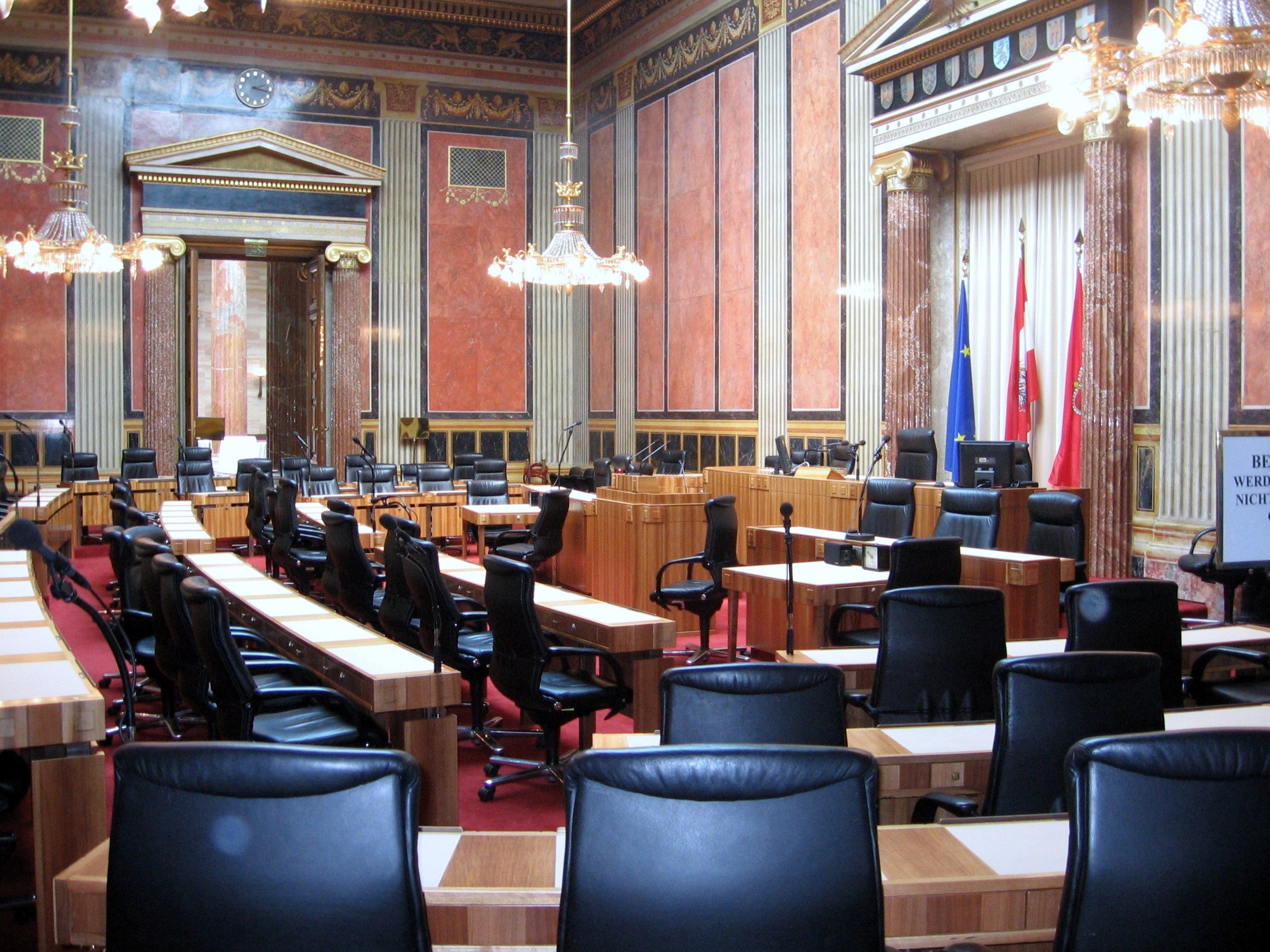
Before the renovation of the Parliament Building the Federal Council met in the Antechamber of the House of Lords.

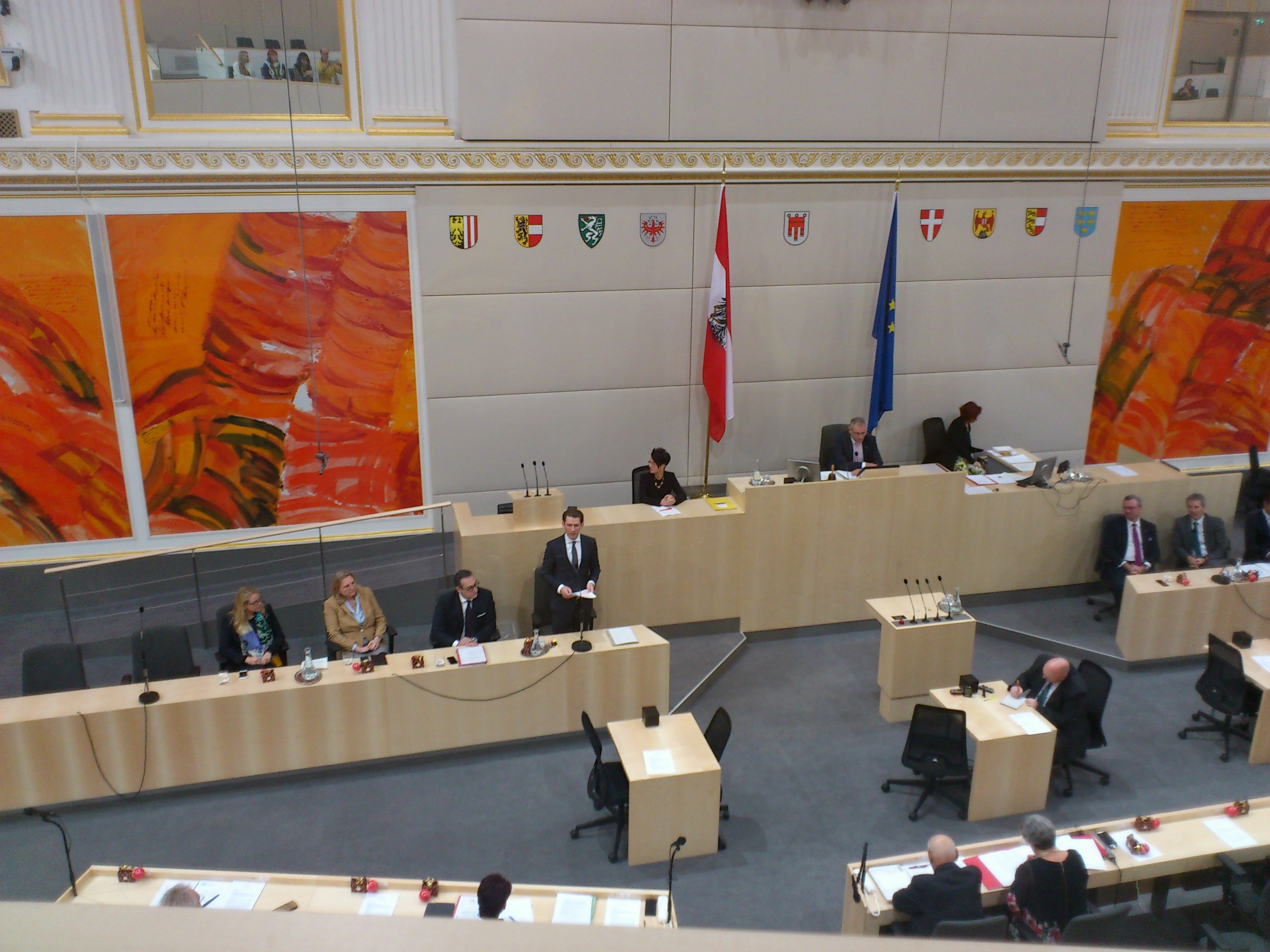
During the renovation of the Parliament Building the Federal Council met in the Hofburg.

The Federal Council (German: Bundesrat, pronounced [ˈbʊndəsʁaːt]) is the upper house of the Austrian Parliament, representing the nine states of Austria at the federal level. As part of a bicameral legislature alongside the National Council, it can be compared with an upper house or a senate. It is far less powerful than the National Council: although it has to approve every new law decided for by this lower chamber, the latter can – in most cases – overrule the Federal Council's refusal to approve.

The Bundesrat has its seat at the Austrian Parliament Building in Vienna. Since 2023, it meets in a chamber formerly used by the National Council's budget committee. During a major renovation of the parliament building from 2017 until 2023, the Federal Council met in the Hofburg Palace.

== Role ==
As the Constitution of Austria (B-VG) draws a strict distinction between federal and state legislation, its Article 42 provides the Bundesrat only with the right to veto federal laws passed by the National Council. Moreover, in most cases a Federal Council's veto is just suspensive, meaning the National Council can override it, passing the law again by ordinary resolution of at least half of its members. Therefore, the decisions of the Bundesrat can only delay legislation.

In the following cases, though, the Federal Council's approval is mandatory:

- Constitutional laws or regulations limiting the competencies of the federal states
- Laws relating to the rights of the Federal Council itself
- Treaties concerning the jurisdiction of the federal states.

Since its inauguration on 10 November 1920, the deputies of Bundesrat have never achieved the status of a counterbalance in relation to the National Council. Over the decades the role of the Federal Council as a mere adjunct of the Austrian parliament has led to several discussions upon regulatory reforms, towards an actual representation of the states' governments modeled on the German Bundesrat or a popularly-elected chamber representing the states equally similar to the US and Australian senates, or the complete abolition of the second chamber. So far, the concept has been maintained as a manifestation of Austria's federal system.

The Federal Council and the National Council, if in joint session, form a third parliamentary body: the Federal Assembly that convenes for the oath of office of the President of Austria.

== Composition ==
The 60 members of the Federal Council (Mitglieder des Bundesrats, colloquially called Bundesräte) are elected according to proportional representation by each of the Austrian states' legislatures (Landtage) for 5- to 6-year terms. The composition of the Bundesrat therefore changes after every state election and the distribution of seats in the Austrian Landtage. The second largest faction of the particular Landtag has the right to designate at least one deputy. The number of representatives delegated by each Bundesland (state within the country) ranges between three and twelve, depending on its population as ascertained by a regular census; it is fixed per presidential decree.

The deputies may ally along party lines and form parliamentary groups, which have to meet a quorum of five seats, if not admitted by particular resolution. Currently the MPs of the Austrian People's Party (ÖVP), the Social Democratic Party of Austria (SPÖ), the Freedom Party of Austria (FPÖ) and The Greens form political groups (Fraktionen) in the Bundesrat. Although there is a NEOS member, political groups require 5 members. The seat distribution (as of July 2025) is as follows:

State	Total	ÖVP	SPÖ	FPÖ	Grüne	NEOS
Burgenland	3	-	2	1	–	–
Carinthia	4	1	2	1	–	–
Lower Austria	12	5	3	3	1	–
Upper Austria	10	5	2	2	1	–
Salzburg	4	2	1	1	–	–
Styria	9	3	2	4	-	–
Tyrol	5	3	1	1	–	–
Vorarlberg	3	2	–	1	-	–
Vienna	10	1	5	2	1	1
Total	60	22	18	16	3	1

Seat distribution by state

The President of the Federal Council is nominated by the largest party of each state in semi-yearly intervals.

== Presidium ==
The Federal Council is made up of a president (elected for a term of half a year) and 2 vice-presidents.

== History ==
In February 2019, the Federal Council prevented a bill from being passed for the first time in its history. An amendment to the Green Electricity Act was rejected, with all 21 SPÖ deputies voting against it. This rejection was possible because the law being voted on would have restricted the competences of the states.

== See also ==
- Federal Assembly (Austria)
- Politics of Austria
- National Council (Austria)
