= History of immigration to the United States =

Pictorial map designed as companion piece to John F. Kennedy's pamphlet, A Nation of Immigrants (1959)

Throughout United States history, the country experienced successive waves of immigration, particularly from Europe and later on from Asia and Latin America. Colonial era immigrants often repaid the cost of transoceanic transportation by becoming indentured servants where the employer paid the ship's captain. In the late 19th century, immigration from China and Japan was restricted. In the 1920s, restrictive immigration quotas were imposed, but political refugees had special status. Numerical restrictions ended in 1965. In recent years, the largest numbers of immigrants to the United States have come from Asia and Central America (see Central American crisis).

Attitudes towards new immigrants have fluctuated from favorable to hostile since the 1790s. Recent debates have focused on the southern border and the status of "dreamers", people who illegally migrated with their families when they were children and have lived in the U.S. for almost their entire lives (see Deferred Action for Childhood Arrivals).

== Colonial era ==
In 1607, the first successful English colony settled in Jamestown, Virginia. Once tobacco had been found to be a profitable cash crop, many plantations were established along the Chesapeake Bay in Virginia and Maryland. The colonists were met with hard times including famine, illness, and their relationship with the local Native American tribes. There were several historic events that took place in Jamestown between the settlers and the Native American tribes. When settler John Rolfe married Pocohontas, there was a moment of peace between the two cultures. Prior to the union, Algonquian tribes battled the settlers. 1609 was known as the "Starving Time" since over 100 settlers died from starvation and illness. Rolfe introduced a new type of tobacco seed from the West Indies, and the Jamestown society began to improve.

Thus began the first and longest era of immigration that lasted until the American Revolution in 1775. Settlements grew from initial English toeholds from the New World to British America. It brought Northern European immigrants, primarily of British, German, and Dutch extraction. The English ruled from the mid-17th century and were by far the largest group of arrivals remaining within the British Empire. Over 90% of those early immigrants became farmers.

Large numbers of young men and women came alone as indentured servants. Their passage was paid by employers in the colonies who needed help on the farms or in shops. Indentured servants were provided food, housing, clothing and training but did not receive wages. At the end of the indenture (usually around age 21, or after a service of seven years), they were free to marry and start their own farms.

=== New England ===
Seeking religious freedom in the New World, 100 English Pilgrims established a small settlement near Plymouth, Massachusetts, in 1620. Tens of thousands of English Puritans arrived, mostly from the East Anglia (Norfolk, Suffolk, Essex), and settled in Boston, Massachusetts and the adjacent areas from around 1629 to 1640 to create a land dedicated to their religion. The earliest New English colonies—Massachusetts, Connecticut, Rhode Island, and New Hampshire—were established along the northeastern coast. Large-scale immigration to this region ended before 1700, but a small but steady trickle of later arrivals continued.

Plymouth Colony was founded by a group of European settlers known as the pilgrims who had left Europe to separate from the Church of England and wanted religious freedom. They sailed from England on the Mayflower and arrived in 1620. Plymouth was part of the New England Confederation, made up of four Puritan colonies: Plymouth, Massachusetts, Connecticut and New Haven. The colonies formed an alliance to protect themselves from attacks from Native American tribes, the Dutch, and the French.

The Pilgrims were a small group of people from Scrooby, England. They originally left England to go to Holland because they faced persecution from the Church of England, and they eventually ended in North America, where they began a new life. The Netherlands provided the Puritans with somewhat more tolerance, but they felt that it was their calling to spread the Gospel to the New World, which led them to America.

The New English colonists were the most urban and educated of all their contemporaries and had had many skilled farmers, tradesmen and craftsmen among them. They started the first university, Harvard, in 1635 to train their ministers. They mostly settled in small villages for mutual support (nearly all of them had their own militias) and common religious activities.

Shipbuilding, commerce, agriculture, and fishing were the main sources of income. New England's healthy climate (the cold winters killed the mosquitoes and other disease-bearing insects), small widespread villages (minimizing the spread of disease), and abundant food supply resulted in the lowest death rate and the highest birth rate of any of the colonies. The eastern and northern frontier around the initial New England settlements was mainly settled by the descendants of the original New Englanders. Immigration to the New England colonies after 1640 and the start of the English Civil War decreased to less than 1% (about equal to the death rate) in nearly all of the years prior to 1845. The rapid growth of the New England colonies (approximately 900,000 by 1790) was almost entirely from the high birth rate (>3%) and the low death rate (<1%) per year.

=== Dutch ===
The Dutch colonies, which were organized by the United East Indian Company, were first established along the Hudson River starting about 1626. Wealthy Dutch patroons set up large landed estates along the Hudson and brought in farmers, who became renters. Others established rich trading posts to trade with Native Americans and started cities such as New Amsterdam (now New York City) and Albany, New York. After the English seized the colony and renamed it New York, Germans (from the Palatinate) and Yankees (from New England) began arriving.

The Dutch initially settled in territories in present day New York, Delaware, Maryland, Pennsylvania, Connecticut, and New Jersey. The Dutch controlled New Netherland for 40 years, when in 1664 it was taken over by the English. In 1696, almost 30,000 people lived in the Province of New York. There were many farm products because of the woods and grasslands, which provided feed for the animals. The Hudson was used to ship farm products and furs.

=== Middle Colonies ===
Maryland, New York, New Jersey, Pennsylvania, and Delaware formed the Middle Colonies. Pennsylvania was settled by Quakers from England and Wales, followed by Ulster Scots (northern Ireland) on the frontier and numerous German Protestant sects, including the German Palatines. The earlier colony of New Sweden had small settlements on the lower Delaware River, with immigrants of Swedes and Finns. Those colonies were absorbed by 1676.

The Middle Colonies were scattered west of New York City and Philadelphia (established 1682). New York City had the most diverse residents from different nations and prospered as a major trading and commercial center after about 1700. From around 1680 to 1725, Pennsylvania was controlled by the Quakers. The commercial center of Philadelphia was run mostly by prosperous Quakers and was supplemented by many small farming and trading communities, with a strong German contingent located in villages in the Delaware River valley.

Around 1680, when Pennsylvania was founded, many more settlers started to arrive in the Middle Colonies. Many Protestant sects were attracted by freedom of religion and good cheap land. They were about 60% British and 33% German. By 1780, New York's population was around 27% descendants of Dutch settlers, about 6% African, and the remainder mostly English with a wide mixture of other Europeans. New Jersey and Delaware had a British majority, with 7–11% Germans, about 6% Africans, and a small contingent of the Swedish descendants of New Sweden.

=== Frontier ===
The western frontier (the inland parts of Pennsylvania and the southern colonies) was mainly settled from about 1717 to 1775 by Presbyterian farmers from Northern England border lands, Scotland, and Ulster who were fleeing hard times and religious persecution. Between 250,000 and 400,000 Scots-Irish migrated to America in the 18th century. The Scots-Irish soon became the dominant culture of the Appalachians. Areas whose 20th-century censuses reported mostly "American" ancestry were the places in which historically, northern English, Scottish and Scots-Irish Protestants settled: in the interior of the South, and the Appalachian region. Scots-Irish American immigrants, were made up of people from the southernmost counties of Scotland who had initially settled in Ireland. They were heavily Presbyterian, and largely self-sufficient. The Scots-Irish arrived in large numbers in the early 18th century and often preferred to settle in the back country and the frontier, where they mingled with second-generation and later English settlers. They enjoyed the very cheap land and independence from established governments common to frontier settlements.

=== Southern Colonies ===
The mostly-agricultural Southern Colonies initially had very high death rates for new settlers because of malaria, yellow fever, and other diseases, as well as skirmishes with Native Americans. However, a steady flow of immigrants, mostly from central England and the London area, kept the population growth. As early as 1630, initial areas of settlement had already been largely cleared of Native Americans by major outbreaks of measles, smallpox, and bubonic plague decades before European settlers began arriving in large numbers. The leading killer was smallpox, which arrived in the New World around 1510–1530.

Initially, the plantations established in these colonies were mostly owned by friends (mostly minor aristocrats and gentry) of the British-appointed governors. A group of Gaelic-speaking Scottish Highlanders created a settlement at Cape Fear in North Carolina, which remained culturally distinct until the mid-18th century, when it was swallowed up by the dominant English-origin culture. Many settlers from Europe arrived as indentured servants and had their passage paid for, in return for five to seven years of work, including free room and board, clothing, and training, but without cash wages. After their periods of indenture expired, many of the former servants founded small farms on the frontier.

By the early 18th century, the arrival of enslaved Africans became a significant component of the immigrant population in the Southern colonies. In fact, between 1700 and 1740, a large majority of the net overseas migration to the southern colonies were Africans. In the third quarter of the 18th century, the population of that region amounted to roughly 55% British, 38% African and 7% German. In 1790, 42% of the population in South Carolina and in Georgia was of African origin. Before 1800, the growing of tobacco, rice, and indigo in plantations in the Southern colonies had relied heavily on the labor of slaves from Africa. The Atlantic slave trade to mainland North America stopped during the American Revolution and was outlawed in most states by 1800 and the entire nation in the 1808 Act Prohibiting Importation of Slaves, but some slaves continued to be smuggled in illegally.

=== Characteristics ===
The Thirteen Colonies differed in how they were settled and by whom, but they had many similarities. Nearly all were settled and financed by privately organized British settlers or families using free enterprise without any significant royal or parliamentary government support. Nearly all commercial activity was carried out by small, privately owned businesses with good credit both in America and in England, which was essential since they were often cash poor. Most settlements were largely independent of British trade since they grew or manufactured nearly everything that they needed. The average cost of imports per household was 5–15 pounds sterling per year. Most settlements consisted of complete family groups with several generations present. The population was rural, with close to 80% owning the land on which they lived and farmed. After 1700, as the Industrial Revolution progressed, more of the population started to move to cities, as had happened in Britain.

Initially, the Dutch and German settlers spoke languages brought over from Europe, but English was the main language of commerce. Governments and laws mainly copied English models. The only major British institution to be abandoned was the aristocracy, which was almost totally absent. The settlers generally established their own law courts and popularly elected governments. The self-ruling pattern became so ingrained that for the next 200 years, almost all new settlements had their own government up and running shortly after the settlers' arrival.

After the colonies were established, their population growth comprised almost entirely organic growth, with foreign-born immigrant populations rarely exceeding 10%. The last significant colonies to be settled primarily by immigrants were Pennsylvania (post-1680s), the Carolinas (post-1663), and Georgia (post-1732). Even there, the immigrants came mostly from England and Scotland, with the exception of Pennsylvania's large Germanic contingent. Elsewhere, internal American migration from other colonies provided nearly all of the settlers for each new colony or state. Populations grew by about 80% over a 20-year period, at a "natural" annual growth rate of 3%.

Over half of all new British immigrants in the South initially arrived as indentured servants, mostly poor young people who could not find work in England or afford passage to America. In addition, about 60,000 British convicts who were guilty of minor offences were transported to the British colonies in the 18th century, with the "serious" criminals generally having been executed. Ironically, those convicts are often the only immigrants with nearly complete immigration records, as other immigrants typically arrived with few or no records.

== Other colonies ==
=== Spanish ===
Although Spain set up a few forts in Florida, notably San Agustín (present-day Saint Augustine) in 1565, it sent few settlers to Florida. Colonists moving north from Mexico founded San Juan on the Rio Grande in 1598 and Santa Fe in 1607–1608. The settlers were forced to leave temporarily for 12 years (1680–1692) by the Pueblo Revolt before returning.

Spanish Texas lasted from 1690 to 1821, when Texas was governed as a colony that was separate from New Spain. In 1731, Canary Islanders (or "Isleños") arrived to establish San Antonio. Very few of the few hundred Texan and New Mexican colonizers in the Spanish colonial period were Spaniards and criollos. California, New Mexico, and Arizona all had settlements. In 1781, Mexican settlers founded Los Angeles.

When the former Spanish colonies joined the United States, Californios in California numbered about 10,000 and Tejanos in Texas about 4,000. New Mexico had 47,000 Mexican settlers in 1842. Arizona was only thinly settled. Only a small minority of those settlers were of European descent. As in the rest of the American colonies, new settlements were based on the casta system. Although all could speak Spanish, it was a melting pot of mostly Native Americans with some Spanish, Portuguese, Basques, Jewish, North African Berbers, and Africans. Former Mexican territories joined the United States in 1848 in the Treaty of Guadalupe Hidalgo, which ended the Mexican–American War.

=== French ===
In the late 17th century, French expeditions established a foothold on the Saint Lawrence River, Mississippi River and Gulf Coast. Interior trading posts, forts, and cities were thinly spread. Detroit was the third-largest settlement in New France. New Orleans expanded when several thousand French-speaking refugees from the region of Acadia made their way to Louisiana after the British expulsion, and they settled largely in the southwest Louisiana region now called Acadiana. Their descendants are now called the Cajuns and still dominate the coastal areas. Additional French-speaking refugees entered the area from Saint-Domangue after the Haitian Revolution. Another cultural identity born from French immigrants is the Creole. About 7,000 French-speaking immigrants settled in Louisiana during the 18th century.

== Population in 1790 ==
The following were the countries of origin for new arrivals to the United States before 1790. The regions marked with an asterisk were part of Great Britain. The ancestry of the 3.9 million population in 1790 has been estimated by various sources by sampling last names from the 1790 census and assigning them a country of origin. The Irish in the 1790 census were mostly Scots-Irish. The French were primarily Huguenots. Catholics numbered only 35,000 or roughly 1%. The Native American population inside territorial U.S. boundaries was less than 100,000.

U.S. historical populations
| Region | Immigrants before 1790 | Population 1790 |
| Africa | 360,000 | 757,000 |
| England* | 230,000 | 2,100,000 |
| Ulster Scots-Irish* | 135,000 | 300,000 |
| Germany | 103,000 | 270,000 |
| Scotland* | 48,500 | 150,000 |
| Ireland* | 8,000 | (Incl. in Scot-Irish) |
| Netherlands | 6,000 | 100,000 |
| Wales* | 4,000 | 10,000 |
| France | 3,000 | 15,000 |
| Jewish | 1,000 | 2,000 |
| Sweden | 1,000 | 6,000 |
| Other | 50,000 | 200,000 |
| British Isles total | 425,500 | 2,560,000 |
| Total | 950,000 | 3,900,000 |

The 1790 population reflected the loss of approximately 46,000 Loyalists, or "Tories", who immigrated to Canada at the end of the American Revolution, 10,000 of whom went to England and 6,000 to the Caribbean.

The 1790 census recorded 3.9 million inhabitants (not counting American Indians). Of the total white population of just under 3.2 million in 1790, approximately 86% was of British ancestry (60%, or 1.9 million, English, 4.3% Welsh, 5.4% Scots, 5.8% Irish (South), and 10.5% Scots-Irish). Among those whose ancestry was from outside of British Isles, Germans were 9%, Dutch 3.4%, French 2.1%, and Swedish 0.25%. Africans made up 19.3% (or 762,000) of the U.S. population. The number of Scots was 200,000; Irish and Scots-Irish 625,000. The overwhelming majority of Southern Irish were Protestant, as there were only 60,000 Catholics in the United States in 1790, 1.6% of the population. Many U.S. Catholics were descendants of English Catholic settlers in the 17th century, and the rest were Irish, German and some Acadians who remained. In that era, the population roughly doubled every 23 years, mostly by natural increase. Relentless population expansion pushed the U.S. frontier to the Pacific by 1848. Most immigrants came long distances to settle in the United States. However, many Irish left Canada for the United States in the 1840s. French Canadians, who moved south from Quebec after 1860, and Mexicans, who came north after 1911, found it easier to move back and forth.

== From 1790 to 1850s ==
Excluding enslaved Africans, there was relatively little immigration from 1770 to 1830. There was, however, significant emigration from the U.S. to Canada, including about 75,000 Loyalists as well as Germans and others looking for better farmland in what is now Ontario. Large-scale immigration in the 1830s to the 1850s came from Britain, Ireland and Germany, and most were attracted by the cheap farmland. Some were artisans and skilled factory workers who were attracted by the first stage of industrialization. The Irish Catholics were primarily unskilled workers who built a majority of the canals and railroads and settled in urban areas. Many Irish went to the emerging textile mill towns of the Northeast, but others became longshoremen in the growing Atlantic and Gulf port cities. Half of the Germans headed to farms, especially in the Midwest (with some to Texas), and the other half became craftsmen in urban areas.

Nativism took the form of political anti-Catholicism directed mostly at the Irish, as well as Germans. It became important briefly in the mid-1850s in the guise of the Know Nothing party. Most of the Catholics and German Lutherans became Democrats, and most of the other Protestants joined the new Republican Party. During the Civil War, ethnic communities supported the war and produced large numbers of soldiers on both sides. Riots broke out in New York City and other Irish and German strongholds in 1863 when a draft was instituted, particularly in light of the provision exempting those who could afford payment.

Immigration totaled 8,385 in 1820, with immigration totals gradually increasing to 23,322 by 1830; for the 1820s, immigration more than doubled to 143,000. Between 1831 and 1840, immigration more than quadrupled to a total of 599,000. They included about 207,000 Irish, who started to emigrate in large numbers after Britain's easing of travel restrictions, and about 152,000 Germans, 76,000 British, and 46,000 French, the next-largest immigrant groups of the decade.

Between 1841 and 1850, immigration nearly tripled again and totaled 1,713,000 immigrants, including at least 781,000 Irish, 435,000 Germans, 267,000 British, and 77,000 French. The Irish, driven by the Great Famine (1845–1849), emigrated directly from their homeland to escape poverty and death. The failed revolutions of 1848 brought many intellectuals and activists to exile in the U.S. Bad times and poor conditions in Europe drove people out, and land, relatives, freedom, opportunity, and jobs in the U.S. lured them in.

Population and foreign born 1790–1849 Census population, immigrants per decade
| Census | Population | Immigrants^{1} | Foreign born | % |
| 1790 | 3,918,000 | 60,000 |
| 1800 | 5,236,000 | 60,000 |
| 1810 | 7,036,000 | 60,000 |
| 1820 | 10,086,000 | 60,000 |
| 1830 | 12,785,000 | 143,000 | 200,000 ^{2} | 1.6% |
| 1840 | 17,018,000 | 599,000 | 800,000 ^{2} | 4.7% |
| 1850 | 23,054,000 | 1,713,000 | 2,244,000 | 9.7% |
1. The total number immigrating in each decade from 1790 to 1820 are estimates.; 2. The number of foreign born in 1830 and 1840 decades are extrapolations.

Starting in 1820, some federal records, including ship passenger lists, were kept for immigration purposes, and a gradual increase in immigration was recorded. More complete immigration records provide data on immigration after 1830. Though conducted since 1790, the census of 1850 was the first in which place of birth was asked specifically. The foreign-born population in the U.S. likely reached its minimum around 1815, at approximately 100,000 or 1% of the population. By 1815, most of the immigrants who arrived before the American Revolution had died, and there had been almost no new immigration thereafter.

Nearly all population growth up to 1830 was by internal increase. Around 98% of the population was native-born. By 1850, that shifted to about 90% native-born. The first significant Catholic immigration started in the mid-1840s and lowered the population from about 95% Protestant to about 90% by 1850.

In 1848, the Treaty of Guadalupe Hidalgo extended U.S. citizenship to approximately 60,000 Mexican residents of the New Mexico Territory and 10,000 living in Mexican California. An additional approximate 2,500 foreign-born California residents also became U.S. citizens. In 1849, the California gold rush attracted 100,000 from the Eastern United States, Latin America, China, Australia, and Europe. California became a state in 1850 with a population of about 90,000.

== From 1850 to 1930 ==
=== Demography ===
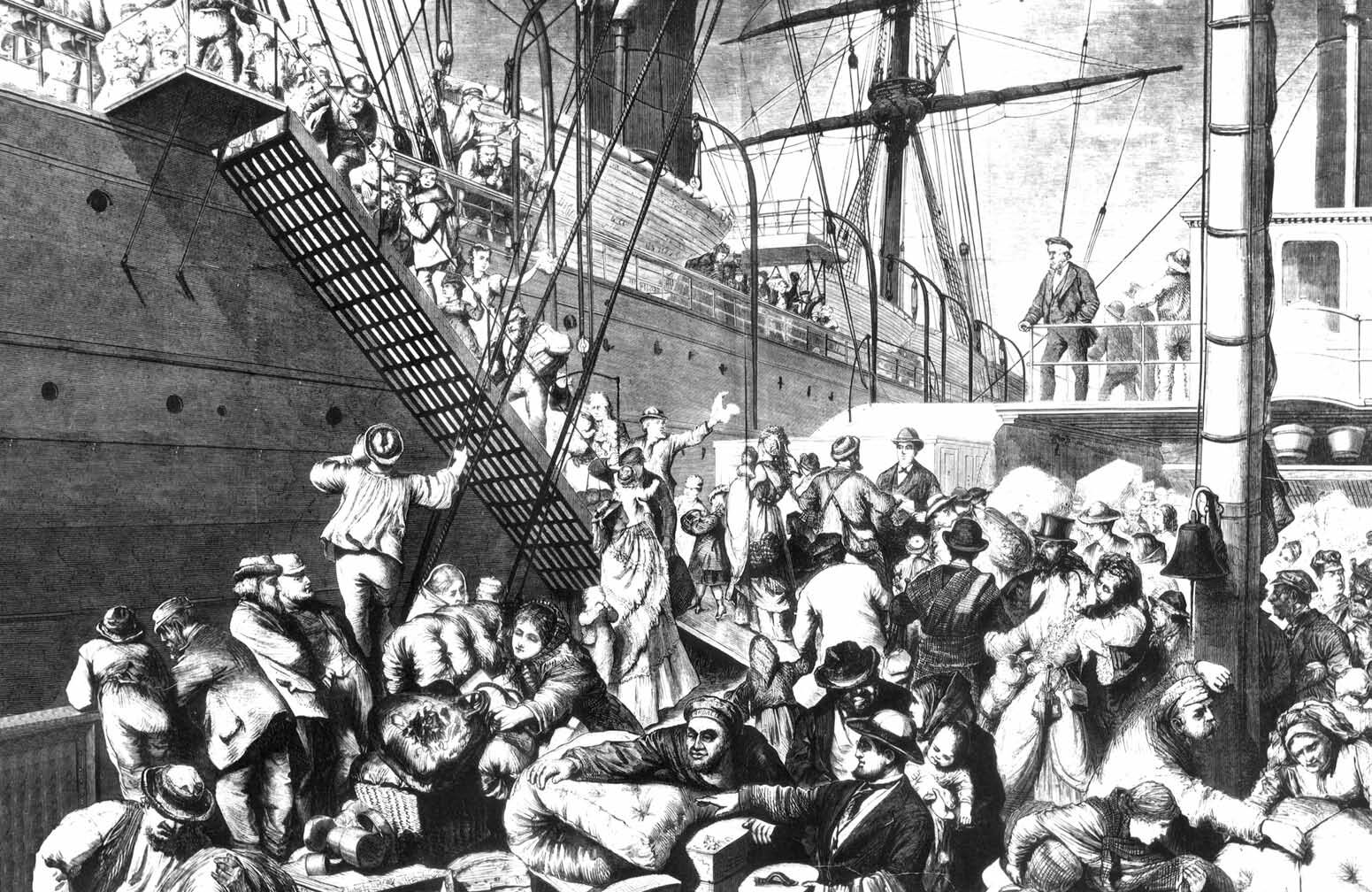
"From the Old to the New World" shows German emigrants boarding a steamer in Hamburg and arriving in New York. Harper's Weekly, (New York) November 7, 1874

Between 1850 and 1930, about 5 million Germans migrated to the United States, which peaked between 1881 and 1885, when a million Germans settled, primarily in the Midwest. Today, more than 40 million Americans claim German ancestry—more than any other group except the British.

Germans were significant settlers in Minnesota, with communities established in cities like Minneapolis and Saint Paul. By 1860, Minnesota had a notable German-American population, contributing to the state's development and growth.

Between 1820 and 1930, 3.5 million British and 4.5 million Irish entered America. Before 1845, most Irish immigrants had been Protestants. After 1845, Irish Catholics began arriving in large numbers that were largely driven by the Great Famine.

After 1880, larger steam-powered oceangoing ships replaced sailing ships, which resulted in lower fares and greater immigrant mobility. In addition, the expansion of a railroad system in Europe made it easier for people to reach oceanic ports to board ships. Meanwhile, farming improvements in Southern Europe and the Russian Empire created surplus labor. Young people between the ages of 15 and 30 were predominant among newcomers. In this wave of migration, constituting the third episode in the history of U.S. immigration, nearly 25 million Europeans made the long trip. Italians, Greeks, Hungarians, Poles, and other Slavs made up the bulk of this migration.

=== Destinations ===
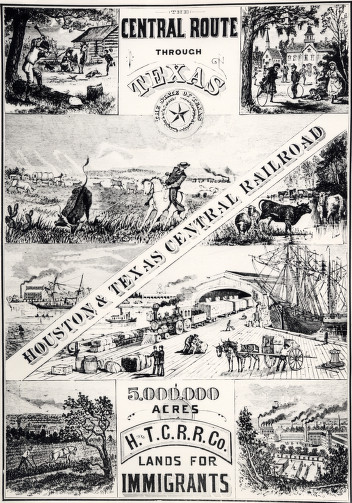
Late 19th century broadside advertisement offering cheap farm land to immigrants; few went to Texas after 1860.

Each group evinced a distinctive migration pattern in terms of the gender balance within the migratory pool, the permanence of their migration, their literacy rates, the balance between adults and children, and the like. However, they shared one overarching characteristic: they flocked to urban destinations and made up the bulk of the U.S. industrial labor pool, which allowed the emergence of such industries as steel, coal, automotive, textile, and garment production and enabled the United States to leap into the front ranks of the world's economic giants.

More than 23 million people immigrated to the United States from 1880 to 1930. Although many of these immigrants settled in urban centers, not all of them stayed in the U.S. permanently. In some groups, like the southern Italian contadini, it was common to return to their place of origin, which about half of them did. Others like 90% of Eastern European Jews stayed permanently. Within the first decade of the 20th century, 14.7% of Americans were born in a different country, with 22% of the population settling in urban areas.

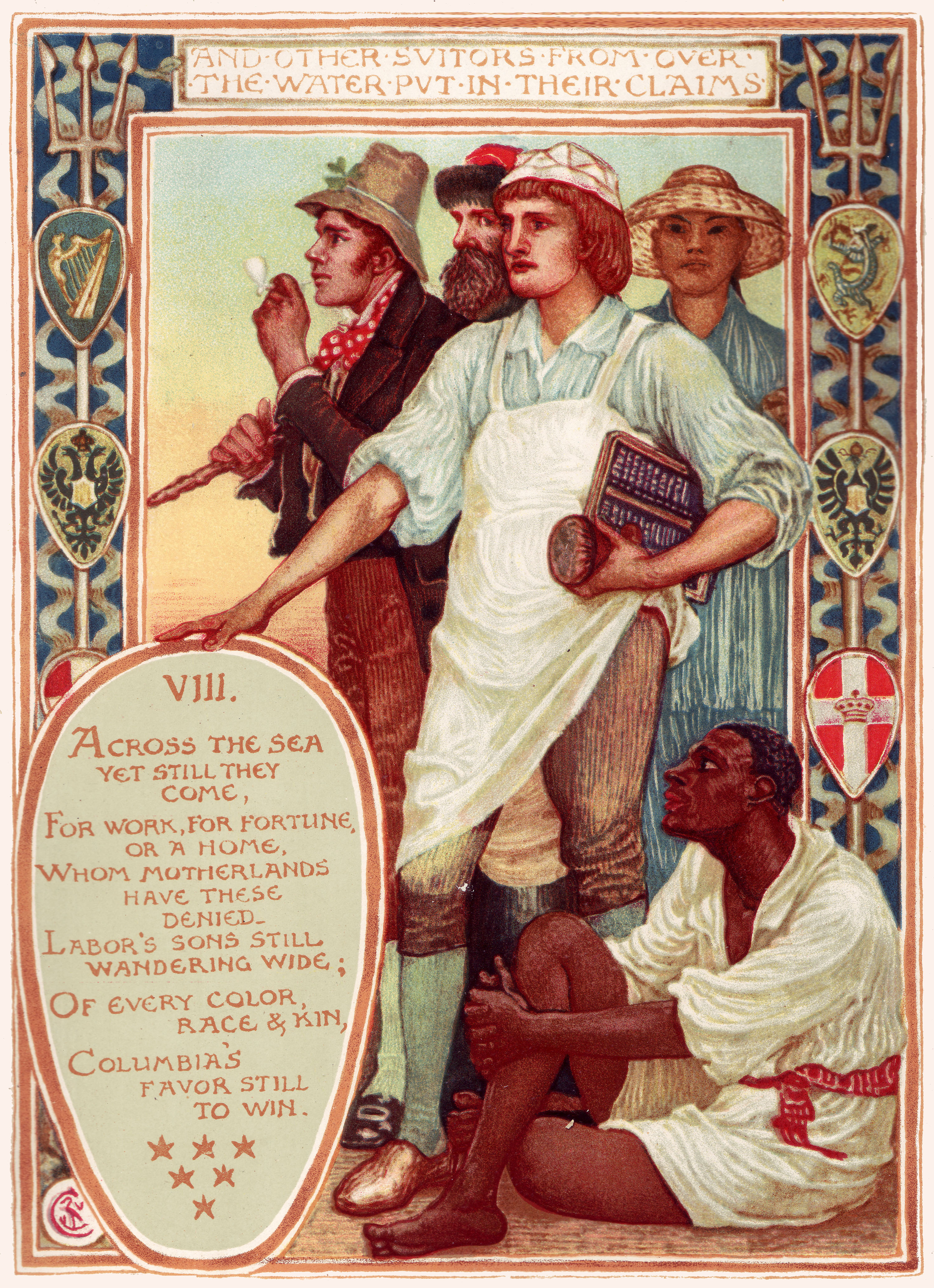
Illustration from Walter Crane's Columbia's Courtship: A Picture History of the United States in Twelve Emblematic Designs in Color with Accompanying Verses (1893)

Their urban destinations and numbers (and perhaps an antipathy towards foreigners) led to the emergence of the second wave of organized xenophobia. By the 1890s, many Americans, particularly from the ranks of the well-off, white, and native-born, considered immigration to pose a serious danger to the nation's health and security. In 1893 the Immigration Restriction League was formed, and it and other similarly-inclined organizations began to press Congress for severe curtailment of foreign immigration.

Irish and German Catholic immigration was opposed in the 1850s by the nativist movement, originating in New York in 1843 as the American Republican Party (not to be confused with the modern Republican Party). Nativism was empowered by popular fears that the country was being overwhelmed by Catholic immigrants, who were often regarded as hostile to American values and controlled by the pope. Active mainly from 1854 to 1856, it strove to curb immigration and naturalization, but its efforts met with little success. There were few prominent leaders, and the largely middle-class and Protestant membership was fragmented over the issue of slavery and had most often joined the Republican Party by the time of the 1860 presidential election.

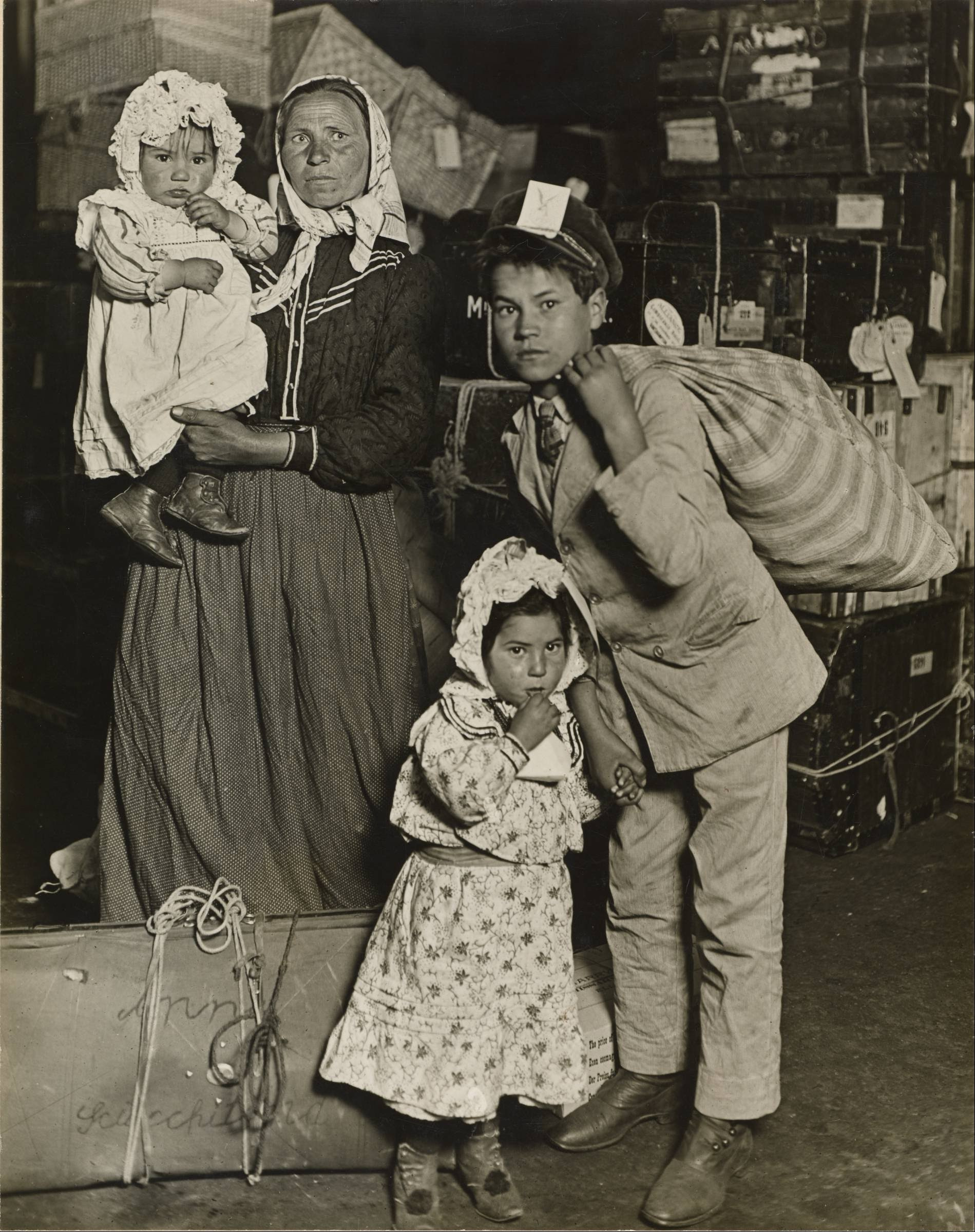
Portrait of an Italian American family (1905)

European immigrants joined the Union Army in large numbers, including 177,000 born in Germany and 144,000 born in Ireland, a full 16% of the Union Army. Many Germans could see the parallels between slavery and serfdom in the old fatherland.

Between 1840 and 1930, about 900,000 French Canadians left Quebec, migrated to the United States, and worked mainly in New England. About half of them returned. 13.6 million Americans claimed to have French ancestry in the 1980 census. Many of them have ancestors who emigrated from French Canada since immigration from France was low throughout the history of the United States. The communities that were established by these immigrants became known as Little Canada.

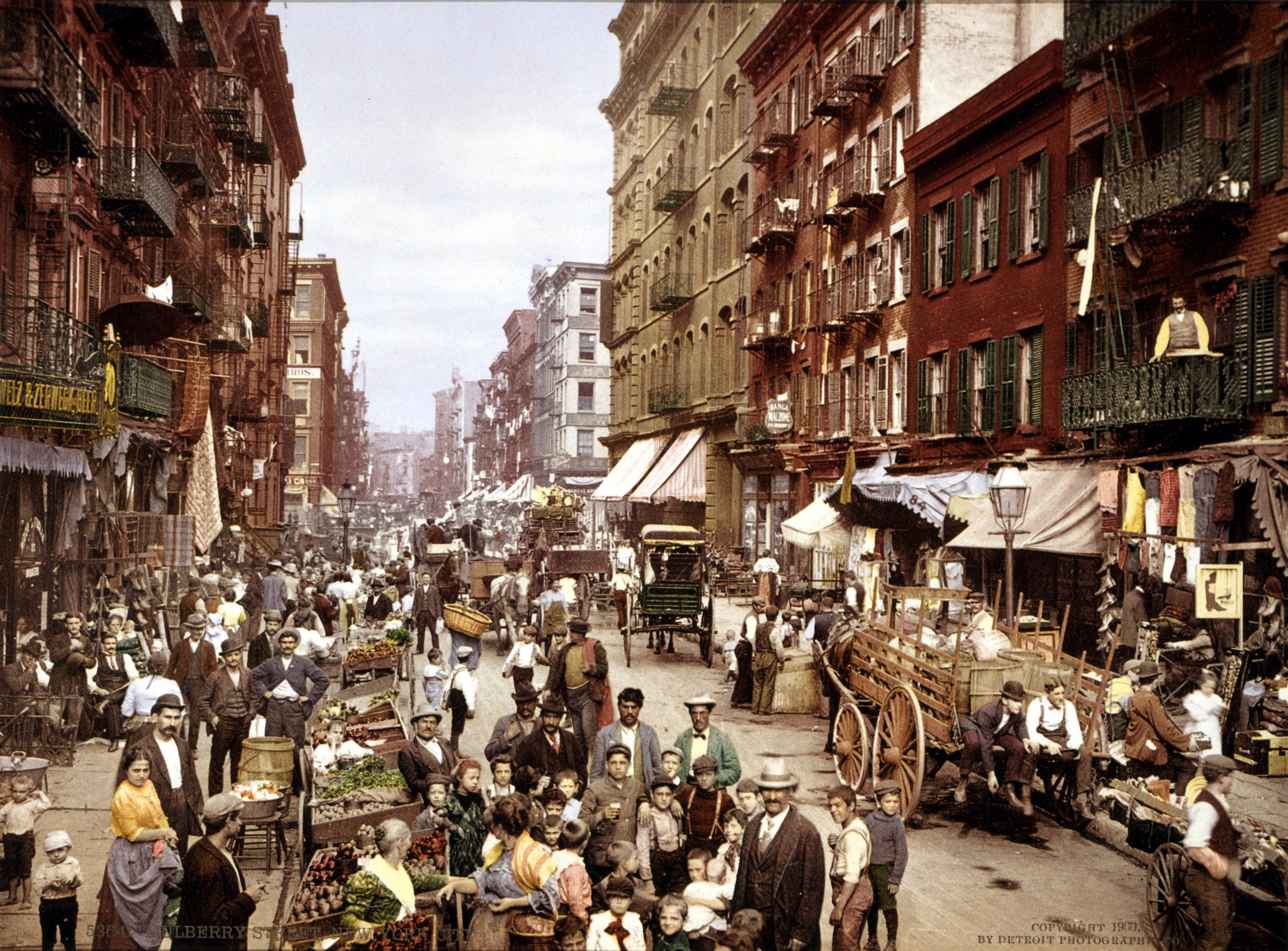
Mulberry Street, along which Manhattan's Little Italy is centered. Lower East Side, circa 1900.

Shortly after the American Civil War, some states passed immigration laws, which prompted the U.S. Supreme Court to rule in 1875 that immigration was a federal responsibility. In 1875, the nation passed its first immigration law, the Page Act of 1875, also known as the Asian Exclusion Act. It outlawed the importation of Asian contract laborers, any Asian woman who would engage in prostitution, and all people considered to be convicts in their own countries.

In 1882, Congress passed the Chinese Exclusion Act. By excluding all Chinese laborers from entering the country, the law severely curtailed the number of immigrants of Chinese descent for 10 years. The law was renewed in 1892 and 1902. During that period, Chinese migrants illegally entered through the loosely-guarded U.S.–Canadian border. The Chinese Exclusion Act was repealed with the passage of the Magnuson Act in 1943.

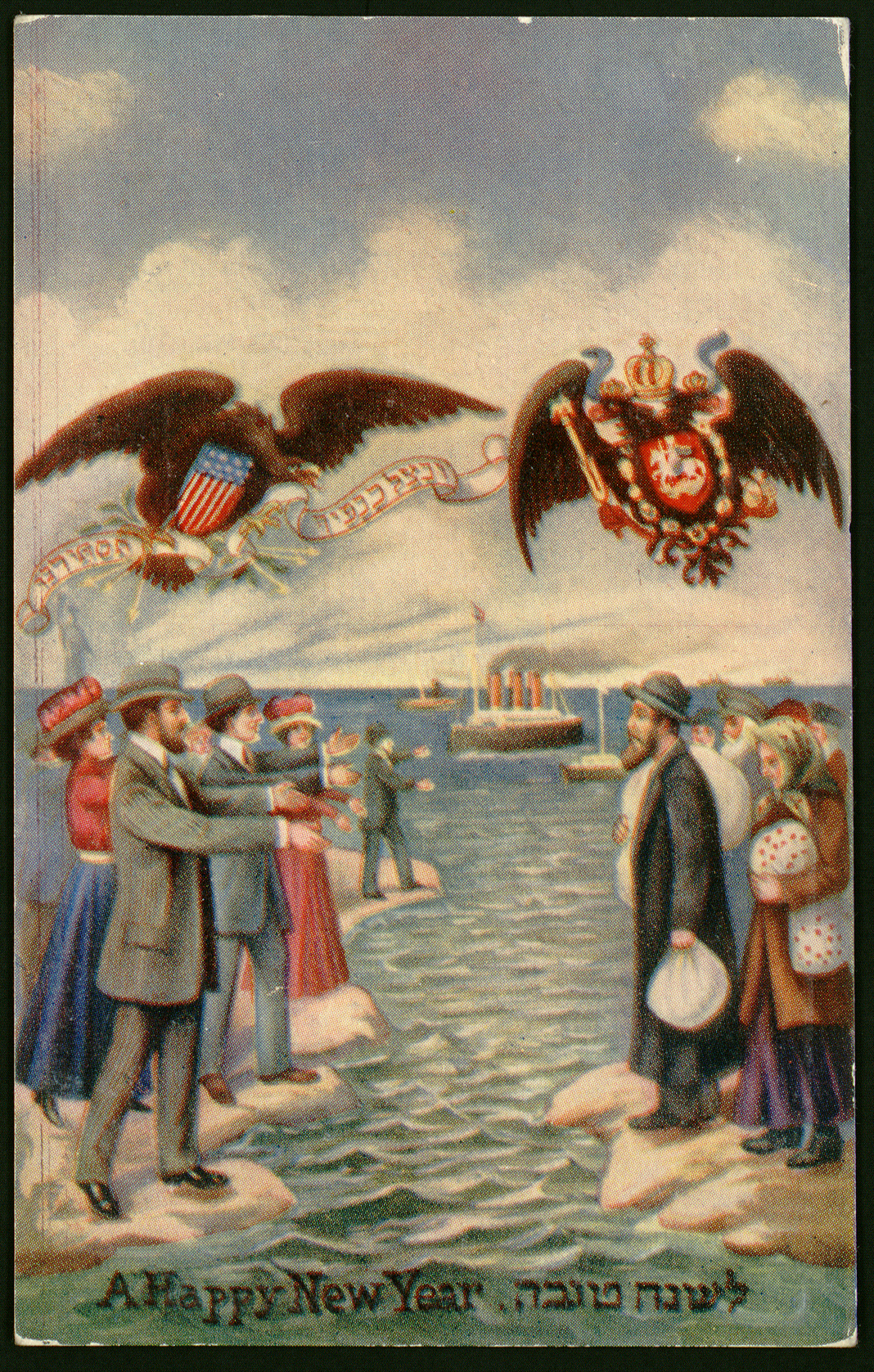
In this Rosh Hashana greeting card from the early 1900s, Russian Jews, packs in hand, gaze at the American relatives beckoning them to the United States. Over two million Jews fled the pogroms of the Russian Empire to the safety of the U.S. from 1881 to 1924.

Prior to 1890, the individual states, rather than the federal government, regulated immigration to the United States. The Immigration Act of 1891 established a Commissioner of Immigration in the Treasury Department. The Canadian Agreement of 1894 extended immigration restrictions to Canadian ports.

The Dillingham Commission was set up by Congress in 1907 to investigate the effects of immigration on the country. The commission's 40-volume analysis of immigration during the previous three decades led it to conclude that the major source of immigration had shifted from Central, Northern, and Western Europeans to Southern Europeans and Russians. It was, however, apt to make generalizations about regional groups that were subjective and failed to differentiate between distinct cultural attributes.

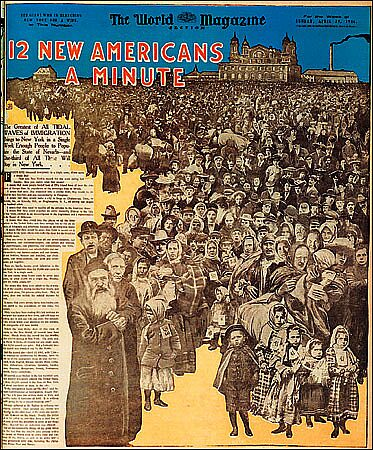
The Sunday magazine of the New York World appealed to Immigrants with this 1906 cover page celebrating their arrival at Ellis Island.

The 1910s marked the high point of Italian immigration. Over two million Italians immigrated in those years, with a total of 5.3 million between 1880 and 1920. About half returned to Italy, after working an average of five years in the U.S.

About 1.5 million Swedes and Norwegians immigrated within this period because of opportunity in America and poverty and religious oppression in the united Sweden–Norway. That accounted for around 20% of the total population of the kingdom at that time. They settled mainly in the Midwest, especially Minnesota and the Dakotas.

Between 1820 and 1850 the number of Danes entering the United States averaged about 60 a year greatly increasing after the Civil War. After 1900, many Danish immigrants were Mormon converts who moved to Utah.

Over two million from Central Europe, mainly Catholics and Jews, immigrated between 1880 and 1924. People of Polish ancestry are the second largest Central European ancestry group in the United States, after the Germans. The immigration of Eastern Orthodox ethnic groups was much lower.

Lebanese and Syrian immigrants started to settle in large numbers in the late 19th and early 20th centuries. The vast majority of the immigrants from Lebanon and Syria were Christians, but smaller numbers of Jews, Muslims, and Druze also settled. Many lived in New York City's Little Syria and in Boston. In the 1920s and 1930s, a large number of these immigrants set out West, with Detroit receiving a large number of Middle Eastern immigrants and many Midwestern areas had Arabs work as farmers.

Congress passed a literacy requirement in 1917 to curb the influx of low-skilled immigrants. The Emergency Quota Act was passed in 1921, followed by the Immigration Act of 1924, which supplanted earlier acts to effectively ban all immigration from Asia and set quotas for the Eastern Hemisphere so that no more than 2% of nationalities, as represented in the 1890 census, were allowed to immigrate.

=== New immigration ===
Film by Edison Studios showing immigrants disembarking from the steam ferryboat William Myers onto Ellis Island on July 9, 1903.

"New immigration" was a term from the late 1880s that refers to the influx of Catholic and to a lesser extent Jewish immigrants from southern and eastern Europe (areas that previously sent few immigrants). The great majority came through Ellis Island in New York, thus making the Northeast a major target of settlement. However there were a few efforts, such as the Galveston Movement, to redirect immigrants to other ports and disperse some of the settlement to other areas of the country.

Nativists feared immigrants lacked the political, social, and occupational skills needed to successfully assimilate into American culture. This raised the issue of whether the U.S. was still a "melting pot", or if it had just become a "dumping ground", and many old-stock Americans worried about negative effects on the economy, politics, and culture. A major proposal was to impose a literacy test, whereby applicants had to be able to read and write in their own language before they were admitted. In Southern and Eastern Europe, literacy was low because the governments did not invest in schools.

== From 1920 to 2000 ==
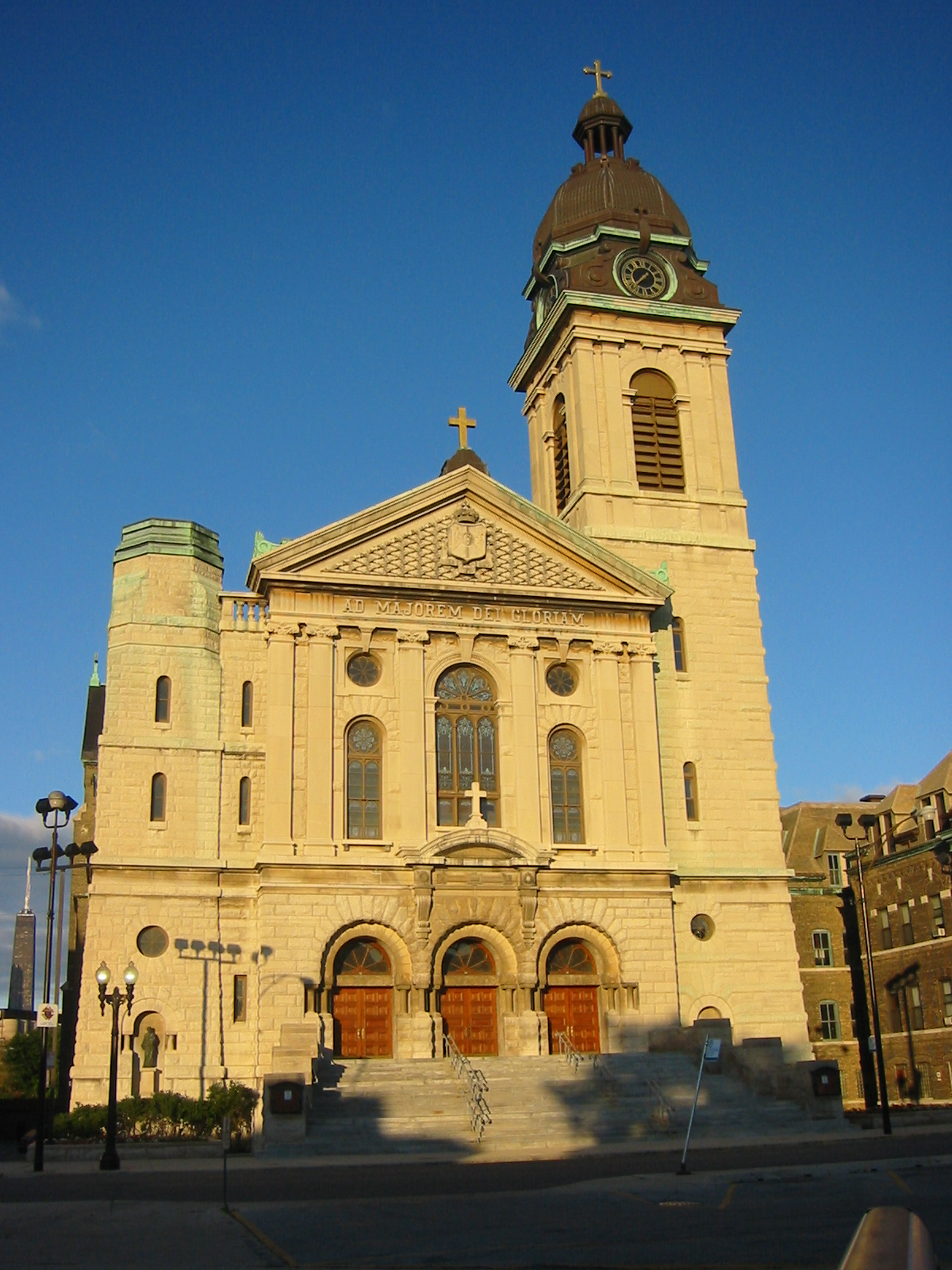
As a result of immigration, Catholicism became the largest denomination. St. John Cantius, one of Chicago's "Polish Cathedrals" was one of the churches these new immigrants built despite their poverty.

Restriction had proceeded piecemeal over the course of the late 19th and the early 20th centuries, but immediately after the end of World War I and in the early 1920s, Congress changed the nation's basic policy about immigration. The National Origins Formula of 1921 and its final form in 1924 restricted the number of immigrants who might enter the United States and assigned slots according to quotas based on national origins.

The bill was so limiting that the number of immigrants between 1921 and 1922 decreased by nearly 500,000. A complicated piece of legislation, it essentially gave preference to immigrants from Central, Northern, and Western Europe; limited the numbers from Eastern Europe and Southern Europe; and gave zero quotas to Asia—however, close family members could come. The legislation excluded Latin America from the quota system. Immigrants moved quite freely from Mexico, the Caribbean (including Jamaica, Barbados, and Haiti), and other parts of Central and South America.

The era of the 1924 legislation lasted until 1965. During those 40 years, the United States began to admit, case by case, limited numbers of refugees. Jewish refugees from Nazi Germany before World War II, Jewish Holocaust survivors after the war, non-Jewish displaced persons fleeing communist rule in Central Europe and the Soviet Union, Hungarians seeking refuge after their failed uprising in 1956, and Cubans after the 1959 revolution managed to find haven in the United States when their plight moved the collective conscience of America, but the basic immigration law remained in place.

=== Mexican immigration ===
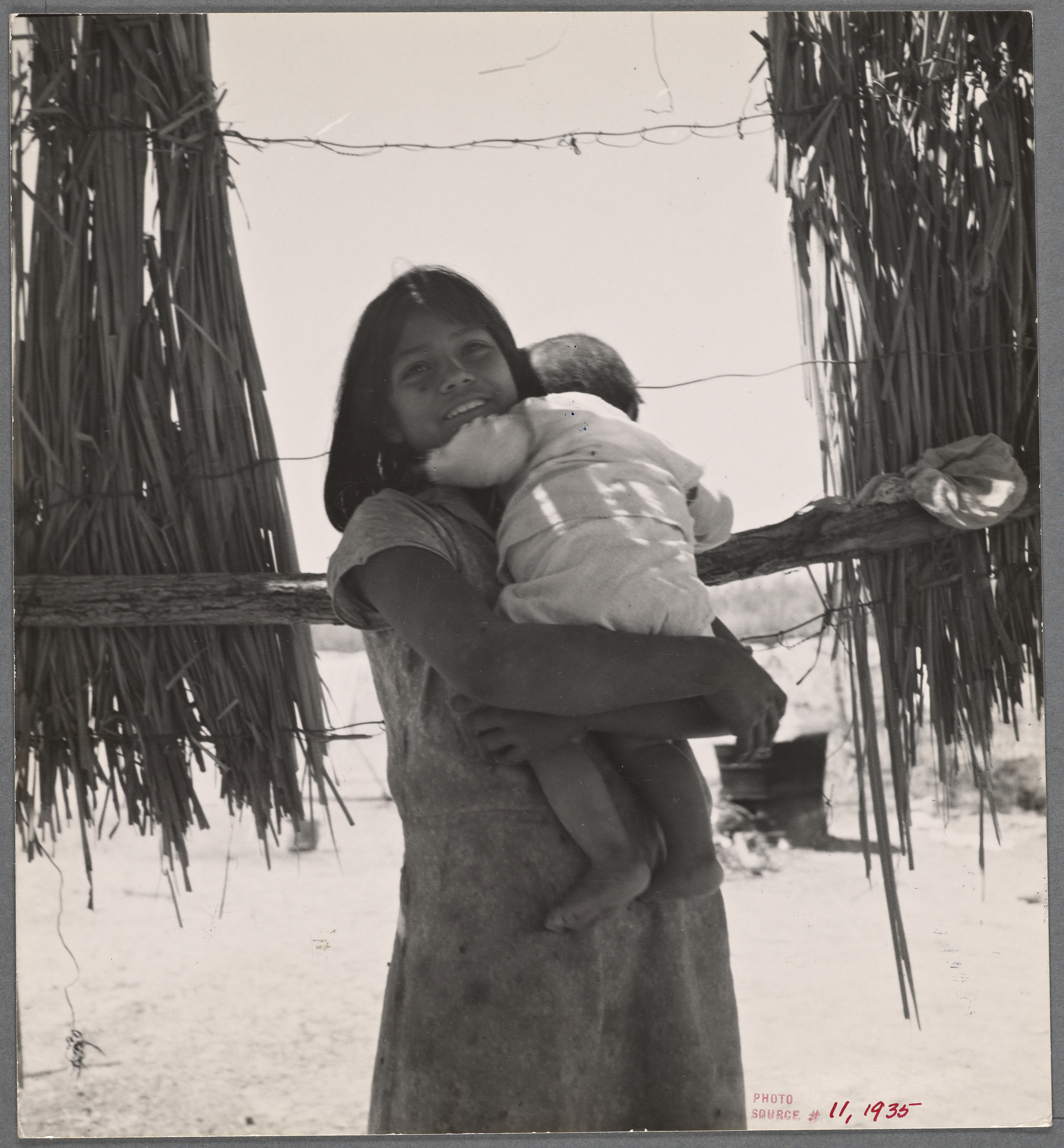
Portrait of a Mexican American mother with her child (1935)

In the early 20th century, Mexico was troubled by two civil wars, increasing Mexican immigration five-fold, from 20,000 per year in 1910 to between 50,000 and 100,000 by the end of the Mexican Revolution in 1920. The Mexican Revolution was followed by the Cristero War that lasted from 1926 to 1929. People moved throughout the border, with immigrants, refugees, and exiles fleeing Mexico, and rebels going back and forth from the Mexican-American border to contribute to the war effort. Combined, both conflicts had over a million deaths and led hundreds of thousands of Mexicans to flee to the United States in order to pursue better economic conditions and stability. The Mexican Revolution was a nation-wide conflict while the Cristero War was centralized in the Center-Pacific region of the country, so immigrants coming from the Revolution came from many states, while immigrants arriving due to the Cristero War originated in the Center-Pacific region. The states in this region include Jalisco, Guanajuato, Hidalgo, and Michoacán and the immigrants and refugees from these regions were mostly farmers, ranchers, laborers who settled in states such as Texas, California, and New Mexico.

=== Equal Nationality Acts ===
The Nationality Act of 1934 allowed foreign-born children of American mothers and alien fathers who had entered the U.S. before the age of 18 and had lived in the country for five years to apply for citizenship for the first time. It also made the naturalization process quicker for the alien husbands of American wives. The law equalized expatriation, immigration, naturalization, and repatriation between women and men. However, it was not applied retroactively and was modified by later laws, such as the Nationality Act of 1940.

=== Filipino immigration ===
In 1934, the Tydings–McDuffie Act provided independence of the Philippines on July 4, 1946. Until 1965, national origin quotas strictly limited immigration from the Philippines. In 1965, after revision of the immigration law, significant Filipino immigration began, totaling 1,728,000 by 2004.

=== Postwar immigration ===
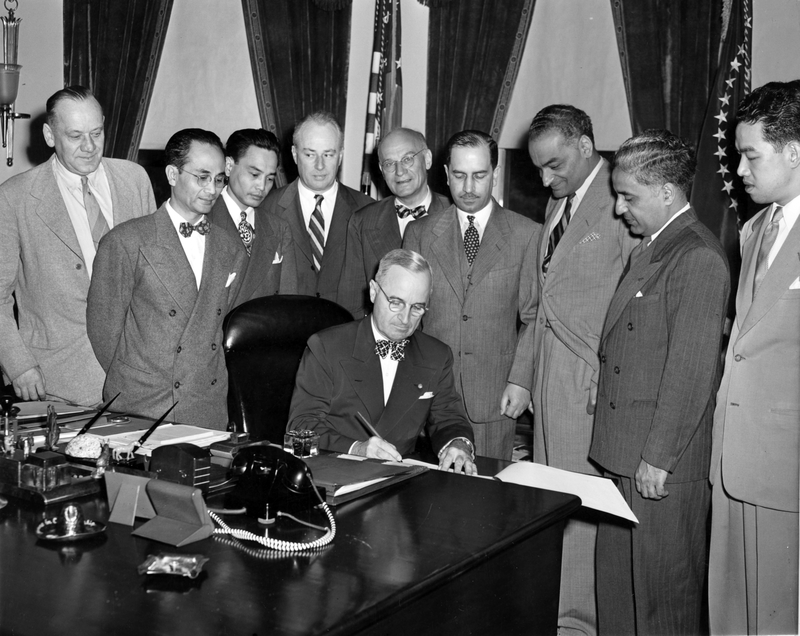
U.S. President Harry Truman signing into law the Luce–Celler Act in 1946

In 1945, the War Brides Act allowed foreign-born wives of U.S. citizens who had served in the U.S. Armed Forces to immigrate. In 1946, the War Brides Act was extended to include the fiancées of soldiers. In 1946, the Luce–Celler Act extended the right to become naturalized citizens to those from the newly-independent nation of the Philippines and to Asian Indians, the immigration quota being set at 100 people per year per country.

At the end of World War II, "regular" immigration increased under the official national origins quota system, as refugees from war-torn Europe began immigrating. After the war, there were jobs for nearly everyone who wanted one, but most women who had been employed during the war went back into the home. From 1941 to 1950, 1,035,000 people immigrated to the U.S., including 226,000 from Germany, 139,000 from the United Kingdom, 171,000 from Canada, 60,000 from Mexico, and 57,000 from Italy.

The Displaced Persons Act of 1948 allowed the displaced people of World War II to start immigrating. Some 200,000 Europeans and 17,000 orphans displaced by World War II were initially allowed to immigrate outside the immigration quotas. President Harry S. Truman signed the first Displaced Persons (DP) Act on June 25, 1948, which allowed entry for 200,000 DPs, and he followed with the more accommodating second DP Act on June 16, 1950, which allowed entry for another 200,000. This quota, including acceptance of 55,000 Volksdeutschen, required sponsorship for all immigrants. The program was the most notoriously bureaucratic of all the DP programs, and much of the humanitarian effort was undertaken by charitable organizations such as the Lutheran World Federation, as well as other ethnic groups. Along with an additional quota of 200,000 granted in 1953 and others in succeeding years, a total of nearly 600,000 refugees were allowed into the country outside the quota system, second only to Israel's 650,000.

=== 1950s ===
In 1950, after the start of the Korean War, the Internal Security Act barred admission of communists, who might engage in activities "which would be prejudicial to the public interest, or would endanger the welfare or safety of the United States." Significant Korean immigration began in 1965 and totaled 848,000 by 2004.

The Immigration and Nationality Act of 1952 affirmed the national origins quota system of 1924 and limited total annual immigration to one sixth of one percent of the population of the continental United States in 1920, or 175,455. It exempted the spouses and children of U.S. citizens and people born in the Western Hemisphere from the quota. In 1953, the Refugee Relief Act extended refugee status to non-Europeans.

In 1954, Operation Wetback forced the return of thousands of illegal immigrants to Mexico. Between 1944 and 1954, "the decade of the wetback," the number of illegal immigrants coming from Mexico increased by 6,000 percent. It is estimated that before Operation Wetback got underway, more than a million workers had crossed the Rio Grande illegally. Cheap labor displaced native agricultural workers, and the increased violations of labor laws and discrimination encouraged criminality, disease, and illiteracy. According to a study conducted in 1950 by the President's Commission on Migratory Labor in Texas, the Rio Grande Valley cotton growers were paying approximately half of the wages that were paid elsewhere in Texas. The United States Border Patrol, aided by municipal, county, state, federal authorities, and the military, began a quasi-military operation to search and seize all illegal immigrants. Fanning out from the lower Rio Grande Valley, Operation Wetback moved northward. Initially, illegal immigrants were repatriated through Presidio, Texas, because the Mexican city that was across the border, Ojinaga, had rail connections to the interior of Mexico by which workers could be quickly moved on to Durango. The forces used by the government were relatively small, perhaps no more than 700 men, but were augmented by border patrol officials, who hoped to scare illegal workers into fleeing back to Mexico. Ships became a preferred mode of transport because they carried illegal workers farther from the border than buses, trucks, or trains. It is difficult to estimate the number of illegal immigrants who left because of the operation, most of them voluntarily. The INS claimed as many as 1,300,000, but the number officially apprehended did not come anywhere near that total. The program was ultimately abandoned because of questions surrounding the ethics of its implementation. Citizens of Mexican descent complained of police stopping all "Mexican looking" people and using extreme "police-state" methods, including the deportation of American-born children who were citizens by law.

Simultaneously, in an attempt to deter illegal immigration, the Bracero Program was created. This was a U.S.-run program working jointly with Mexico's government from 1942 to 1964, to bring agricultural labor to the U.S. This program was created in an attempt to deter illegal immigration by providing a pathway for workers from Mexico to go to the United States and provide steady income back to their families. This 22 year program ran out in 1964 when the legislation expired, and workers would continue to find pathways to enter the United States.

The failed 1956 Hungarian Revolution, before it was crushed by the Soviets, forged a temporary hole in the Iron Curtain that allowed many refugees to escape, with 245,000 Hungarian families being admitted by 1960. From 1950 to 1960, the U.S. had 2,515,000 new immigrants with 477,000 arriving from Germany, 185,000 from Italy, 52,000 from the Netherlands, 203,000 from the United Kingdom, 46,000 from Japan, 300,000 from Mexico, and 377,000 from Canada.

The 1959 Cuban Revolution, led by Fidel Castro, drove the upper and the middle classes to exile, and 409,000 families had immigrated by 1970. That was facilitated by the 1966 Cuban Adjustment Act, which gave permanent resident status to Cubans who were physically present in the United States for one year if they entered after January 1, 1959.

=== Immigration and Nationality Act ===
This all changed with the passage of the Immigration and Nationality Act of 1965, a by-product of the civil rights movement and one of President Lyndon Johnson's Great Society programs. The measure had not been intended to stimulate immigration from Asia, the Middle East, Africa, or elsewhere in the developing world. Rather, by doing away with the racially-based quota system, its authors had expected that immigrants would come from "traditional" societies such as Italy, Greece, and Portugal, which were subject to very small quotas in the 1924 act. The 1965 act replaced the quotas with preferential categories based on family relationships and job skills by giving particular preference to potential immigrants with relatives in the country and with occupations deemed critical by the U.S. Department of Labor. After 1970, after an initial influx from European countries, immigrants from places like Korea, China, India, the Philippines, Pakistan, and Africa became more common.

Immigrant visas were capped depending on which part of the world one would be arriving from. Within the preference system there was a cap of 170,000 for the eastern hemisphere and 120,000 for the western hemisphere, with no one nationality exceeding 20,000.

=== Vietnamese immigration ===
In the mid-1970s, the U.S. government began accepting Vietnamese refugees as part of a humanitarian effort to help those who had fled the Vietnam War. This marked the beginning of a large-scale influx of Vietnamese immigrants. Other Southeast Asians would migrate in the late 1980s.

The arrival of Vietnamese refugees presented challenges for both the refugees and the U.S. government. Many of them had experienced trauma and loss because of the war and needed medical, psychological, and social support. The U.S. government struggled to provide adequate resources and services to the refugees, which led to overcrowding and poor living conditions in refugee camps. Despite the challenges, Vietnamese immigrants made significant contributions to American society. One notable contribution of Vietnamese immigrants was in the field of cuisine. Vietnamese food became increasingly popular in the United States, with pho restaurants and banh mi sandwich shops popping up in cities across the country.

=== 1980s ===
In 1986, the Immigration Reform and Control Act (IRCA) was passed and created for the first time penalties for employers who hired illegal immigrants. IRCA, as proposed in Congress, was projected to give amnesty to about 1,000,000 workers in the country illegally. In practice, amnesty for about 3,000,000 immigrants already in the country was granted, mostly from Mexico. Legal Mexican immigrant family numbers were 2,198,000 in 1980, 4,289,000 in 1990 (includes IRCA), and 7,841,000 in 2000. Adding another 12,000,000 illegal immigrants, of which about 80% are thought to be Mexicans, would bring the Mexican family total to over 16,000,000, about 16% of the Mexican population.

=== 1990s: Illegal Immigration Reform and Immigration Responsibility Act of 1996 ===
Passed in September 1996, the Illegal Immigration Reform and Immigration Responsibility Act (IIRIRA) is a comprehensive immigration reform focusing on restructuring the process for admitting or removing undocumented immigrants. Its passing helped to strengthen U.S. immigration laws, restructure immigration law enforcement, and sought to limit immigration by addressing undocumented migration. The reforms affected legal immigrants, those seeking entry into the U.S. and those living undocumented in the country.

==== Changes in asylum criteria ====
IIRIRA created new barriers for refugees seeking asylum by narrowing the asylum criteria that had been established in the Refugee Act of 1980. To prevent fraudulent asylum filings from people who were migrating for economic or work-related reasons, IIRIRA imposed an all-inclusive filing deadline called the "One Year Bar" to asylum. IIRIRA provided limited exceptions to this rule when an "alien demonstrates to the satisfaction of the Attorney General either the existence of changed circumstances which materially affect the applicant's eligibility for asylum or extraordinary circumstances relating to the delay in filing the application." IIRIRA also made the asylum process more difficult for refugees by allowing for the resettlement of refugees to third countries; "precluding appeals" to denied asylum applications; implementing higher processing fees; and having enforcement officers, rather than judges, determine the expedited removal of refugees.

==== Illegal immigration ====
Law enforcement under IIRIRA was strengthened to restrict unlawful immigration. The act sought to prevent illegal immigration by expanding the number of Border Patrol agents and allowing the Attorney General to obtain resources from other federal agencies. Provisions were also made to improve infrastructure and barriers along the U.S. border area. IIRIRA delegated law enforcement capabilities to state and local officers via 287(g) agreements. Illegal entry was made more difficult by cooperation between federal and local law enforcement, in addition to stiffening penalties for illegal entry and racketeering activities which included alien smuggling and document fraud.

IIRIRA addressed unlawful migration already in the U.S. by enhanced tracking systems that included detecting employment eligibility and visa stay violations as well as creating counterfeit-resistant forms of identification. The act established the three- and ten-year re-entry bars for immigrants who accumulated unlawful presence in the U.S. and become inadmissible upon leaving the country.

The restructuring of law enforcement contributed to an increased number of arrests, detentions, and removals of immigrants. Under IIRIRA, the mandatory detention of broad groups of immigrants occurred, including those who had legal residence status but, upon removal, could have their status be removed after committing violent crimes. Relief and access to federal services were also redefined for immigrants as IIRIRA reiterated the 1996 Welfare Reform Act's tier system between citizens, legal immigrants, refugees, and illegal immigrants, which determined public benefits eligibility. IIRIRA redefined financial self-sufficiency guidelines of sponsors who had not had to meet an income requirement to sponsor an immigrant.

== From 2000 to the present ==
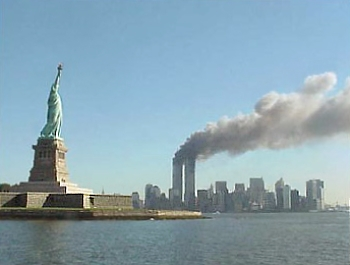
9/11 World Trade Center Attacks

After the attacks of September 11, 2001, immigration policy changed to have an emphasis on tighter national security. On October 26, 2001, the United States passed the Patriot Act which would expand U.S. government surveillance and monitoring to prevent terrorism in the country. This act affected immigration by choosing stronger surveillance and criteria for those allowed into the country.

In 2002, the Homeland Security Act was passed to address terrorism, immigration, and manage border security. This act created the Department of Homeland Security and combined 22 previously existing agencies. After 2003 immigration dropped to around 703,000, down from 841,000 as it had previously seen in 2000. Between 2004 and 2006 the number of immigrants increased from 957,000 to 1.2 million.

=== 2010's ===
In 2012, President Barack Obama passed the Deferred Action for Childhood Arrivals (DACA) which was a policy that created temporary protections from being deported and work opportunities for young immigrants who arrived as children. As immigration policy continuously changed after the 9/11 attacks, multiple immigration policy ideas were introduced into Congress. The DREAM Act (Development, Relief, and Education for Alien Minors Act) was introduced into congress in 2001, once again in 2009 when Obama was elected, and several more consecutive times as this act has still not officially passed. The DREAM Act would create a pathway for permanent residency and those who have been under this act as undocumented children in the U.S. since its introduction. Through this act people who identified as undocumented children brought into the country called themselves Dreamers.

In accordance with DACA, Deferred Action for Parents of Americans and Lawful Permanent Residents was introduced in 2014. This act was an attempt to protect undocumented parents of U.S citizens and lawful permanent residents from deportation. Also introduced by Obama, the act was blocked by federal courts and never enacted—then taken back by the Trump Administration in 2017.

Data taken in 2015 showed 2.1 million people living in the United States had come from Africa, with immigrants coming from many different countries like Nigeria at 327,000, Ethiopia at 222,000, and Egyptians at 192,000.

=== 2020's ===
The Supreme Court gave way for the Trump administration in 2019 to implement the public charge rule. The USCIS would begin to use the public charge rule to scrutinize immigrants and decide whether they would be likely to use any United States public assistance programs. They were allowed to look at a series of factors such as age, education, income, etc.

On August 30, 2021, the United States pulled out its military from Afghanistan, and as a result the U.S. saw an unprecedented amount of Afghan immigrants with around 88,500 making their way into the country. The Afghan Adjustment Act was supposed to create a pathway to permanent residency while expanding the regulations of the Special Immigrant Visa (SIV). The SIV was approved by Congress as a way for Afghans who aided the U.S. on their mission and created a pathway to permanent residency for Afghan immigrants and their families.

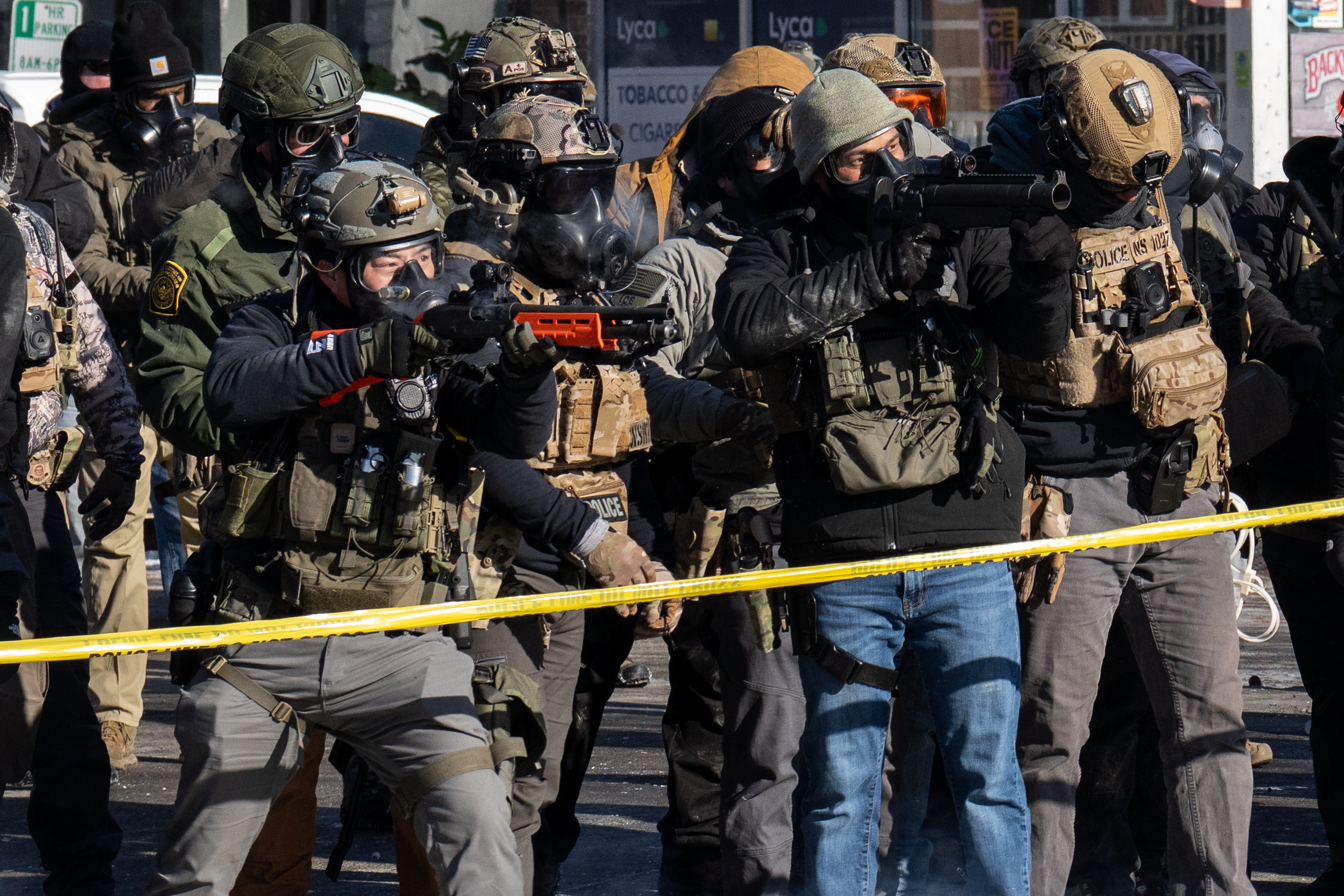
Immigration and Customs Enforcement (ICE) and Customs and Border Protection (CBP) agents in Minneapolis on January 24, 2026 following the killing of Alex Pretti by federal agents.

Between 2020 and 2025 11 million immigrants arrived to the United States seeing shifts in policy through the Biden administration and the Trump administration. In 2025, immigration policy saw a dramatic change in focus on border security and aggressive removal of noncitizens in the country. As stronger policy began to be implemented and Immigration and Customs Enforcement started arresting and detaining noncitizens, on February 17, 2025, the Department of Homeland Security released a warning video to all immigrants who were in the country illegally that they would be put in prison or deported if they didn't leave the country immediately.

== Immigration summary since 1830 ==
Immigration to the United States over time

Total immigration over time by single year

Immigration by region in decade intervals

The top ten birth countries of the foreign born population since 1830, according to the U.S. census, are shown below. Blank entries mean that the country did not make it into the top ten for that census, not that there are no data from that census. The 1830 numbers are from immigration statistics listed in the 2004 Year Book of Immigration Statistics.

The 1830 numbers list un-naturalized foreign citizens and does not include naturalized foreign born. The 1850 census is the first census that asks for place of birth. The historical census data can be found online in the Virginia Library Geostat Center. Population numbers are in thousands.

| Country/Year | 1830• | 1850 | 1880 | 1900 | 1930 | 1960 | 1970 | 1980 | 1990 | 2000 |
|---|---|---|---|---|---|---|---|---|---|---|
| Austria | | | | | | 305 | 214 | | | |
| Bohemia | | | 85 | | | | | | | |
| Canada | 2 | 148 | 717 | 1,180 | 1,310 | 953 | 812 | 843 | 745 | 678 |
| China | | | 104 | | | | | | | 1,391 |
| Cuba | | | | | | | 439 | 608 | 737 | 952 |
| Czechoslovakia | | | | | 492 | | | | | |
| Dominican Republic | | | | | | | | | | 692 |
| El Salvador | | | | | | | | | | 765 |
| France | 9 | 54 | 107 | | | | | | | |
| Germany | 8 | 584 | 1,967 | 2,663 | 1,609 | 990 | 833 | 849 | 712 | |
| Hungary | | | | | | 245 | | | | |
| India | | | | | | | | | | 2,000 |
| Ireland | 54 | 962 | 1,855 | 1,615 | 745 | 339 | | | | |
| Italy | | | | 484 | 1,790 | 1,257 | 1,009 | 832 | 581 | |
| Korea | | | | | | | | 290 | 568 | 701 |
| Mexico | 11 | 13 | | | 641 | 576 | 760 | 2,199 | 4,298 | 7,841 |
| Netherlands | 1 | 10 | | | | | | | | |
| Norway | | 13 | 182 | 336 | | | | | | |
| Pakistan | | | | | | | | | | 724 |
| Philippines | | | | | | | | 501 | 913 | 1,222 |
| Poland | | | | | 1,269 | 748 | 548 | 418 | | |
| Sweden | | | 194 | 582 | 595 | | | | | |
| Switzerland | 3 | 13 | 89 | | | | | | | |
| United Kingdom | 27 | 379 | 918 | 1,168 | 1,403 | 833 | 686 | 669 | 640 | |
| Vietnam | | | | | | | | | 543 | 863 |
| Former Soviet Republics | | | | 424 | 1,154 | 691 | 463 | 406 | | |
| Total foreign born | 108* | 2,244 | 6,679 | 10,341 | 14,204 | 10,347 | 9,619 | 14,079 | 19,763 | 31,100 |
| % Foreign born | 0.8%* | 9.7% | 13.3% | 13.6% | 11.6% | 5.8% | 4.7% | 6.2% | 7.9% | 11.1% |
| Native born | 12,677 | 20,947 | 43,476 | 65,653 | 108,571 | 168,978 | 193,591 | 212,466 | 228,946 | 250,321 |
| % Native born | 99.2% | 90.3% | 86.7% | 86.4% | 88.4% | 94.2% | 95.3% | 94% | 92.1% | 88.9% |
| Total population | 12,785 | 23,191 | 50,155 | 75,994 | 122,775 | 179,325 | 203,210 | 226,545 | 248,709 | 281,421 |
| | 1830 | 1850 | 1880 | 1900 | 1930 | 1960 | 1970 | 1980 | 1990 | 2000 |

Persons obtaining legal permanent resident status fiscal years 1820–2010
| Year | | Year | | Year | |
|---|---|---|---|---|---|
| 1820 | 8,385 | 1885 | 395,346 | 1950 | 249,187 |
| 1825 | 10,199 | 1890 | 455,302 | 1955 | 237,790 |
| 1830 | 23,322 | 1895 | 258,536 | 1960 | 265,398 |
| 1835 | 45,374 | 1900 | 448,572 | 1965 | 296,697 |
| 1840 | 84,066 | 1905 | 1,026,499 | 1970 | 373,326 |
| 1845 | 114,371 | 1910 | 1,041,570 | 1975 | 385,378 |
| 1850 | 369,980 | 1915 | 326,700 | 1980 | 524,295 |
| 1855 | 200,877 | 1920 | 430,001 | 1985 | 568,149 |
| 1860 | 153,640 | 1925 | 294,314 | 1990 | 1,535,872 |
| 1865 | 248,120 | 1930 | 241,700 | 1995 | 720,177 |
| 1870 | 387,203 | 1935 | 34,956 | 2000 | 841,002 |
| 1875 | 227,498 | 1940 | 70,756 | 2005 | 1,122,257 |
| 1880 | 457,257 | 1945 | 38,119 | 2010 | 1,042,625 |

=== Historical foreign-born population by state ===
Foreign-born population by U.S. state as a percentage of the total population (1850–2010)
| State/Territory | 1850 | 1860 | 1870 | 1880 | 1890 | 1900 | 1910 | 1920 | 1930 | 1940 | 1950 | 1960 | 1970 | 1980 | 1990 | 2000 | 2010 |
|---|---|---|---|---|---|---|---|---|---|---|---|---|---|---|---|---|---|
| United States of America | 9.7% | 13.2% | 14.4% | 13.3% | 14.8% | 13.6% | 14.7% | 13.2% | 11.6% | 8.8% | 6.9% | 5.4% | 4.7% | 6.2% | 7.9% | 11.1% | 12.9% |
| Alabama | 1.0% | 1.3% | 1.0% | 0.8% | 1.0% | 0.8% | 0.9% | 0.8% | 0.6% | 0.4% | 0.4% | 0.5% | 0.5% | 1.0% | 1.1% | 2.0% | 3.5% |
| Alaska | | | | | | | | | | | | 3.6% | 2.6% | 4.0% | 4.5% | 5.9% | 6.9% |
| Arizona | | | 60.1% | 39.7% | 31.5% | 19.7% | 23.9% | 24.1% | 15.1% | 7.8% | 6.3% | 5.4% | 4.3% | 6.0% | 7.6% | 12.8% | 13.4% |
| Arkansas | 0.7% | 0.8% | 1.0% | 1.3% | 1.3% | 1.1% | 1.1% | 0.8% | 0.6% | 0.4% | 0.5% | 0.4% | 0.4% | 1.0% | 1.1% | 2.8% | 4.5% |
| California | 23.5% | 38.6% | 37.5% | 33.9% | 30.3% | 24.7% | 24.7% | 22.1% | 18.9% | 13.4% | 10.0% | 8.5% | 8.8% | 15.1% | 21.7% | 26.2% | 27.2% |
| Colorado | | 7.8% | 16.6% | 20.5% | 20.4% | 16.9% | 16.2% | 12.7% | 9.6% | 6.4% | 4.6% | 3.4% | 2.7% | 3.9% | 4.3% | 8.6% | 9.8% |
| Connecticut | 10.4% | 17.5% | 21.1% | 20.9% | 24.6% | 26.2% | 29.6% | 27.4% | 23.9% | 19.3% | 14.8% | 10.9% | 8.6% | 8.6% | 8.5% | 10.9% | 13.6% |
| Delaware | 5.7% | 8.2% | 7.3% | 6.5% | 7.8% | 7.5% | 8.6% | 8.9% | 7.1% | 5.6% | 4.1% | 3.3% | 2.9% | 3.2% | 3.3% | 5.7% | 8.0% |
| (Washington, D.C.) District of Columbia | 9.5% | 16.6% | 12.3% | 9.6% | 8.1% | 7.2% | 7.5% | 6.7% | 6.3% | 5.3% | 5.3% | 5.1% | 4.4% | 6.4% | 9.7% | 12.9% | 13.5% |
| Florida | 3.2% | 2.4% | 2.6% | 3.7% | 5.9% | 4.5% | 5.4% | 5.6% | 4.8% | 4.1% | 4.7% | 5.5% | 8.0% | 10.9% | 12.9% | 16.7% | 19.4% |
| (Georgia (U.S. state)) Georgia | 0.7% | 1.1% | 0.9% | 0.7% | 0.7% | 0.6% | 0.6% | 0.6% | 0.5% | 0.4% | 0.5% | 0.6% | 0.7% | 1.7% | 2.7% | 7.1% | 9.7% |
| Hawaii | | | | | | | | | | | | 10.9% | 9.8% | 14.2% | 14.7% | 17.5% | 18.2% |
| Idaho | | | 52.6% | 30.6% | 20.7% | 15.2% | 13.1% | 9.4% | 7.3% | 4.7% | 3.4% | 2.3% | 1.8% | 2.5% | 2.9% | 5.0% | 5.5% |
| Illinois | 13.1% | 19.0% | 20.3% | 19.0% | 22.0% | 20.1% | 21.4% | 18.7% | 16.3% | 12.3% | 9.1% | 6.8% | 5.7% | 7.2% | 8.3% | 12.3% | 13.7% |
| Indiana | 5.6% | 8.8% | 8.4% | 7.3% | 6.7% | 5.6% | 5.9% | 5.2% | 4.4% | 3.2% | 2.5% | 2.0% | 1.6% | 1.9% | 1.7% | 3.1% | 4.6% |
| Iowa | 10.9% | 15.7% | 17.1% | 16.1% | 17.0% | 13.7% | 12.3% | 9.4% | 6.8% | 4.6% | 3.2% | 2.0% | 1.4% | 1.6% | 1.6% | 3.1% | 4.6% |
| Kansas | | 11.8% | 13.3% | 11.1% | 10.4% | 8.6% | 8.0% | 6.3% | 4.3% | 2.9% | 2.0% | 1.5% | 1.2% | 2.0% | 2.5% | 5.0% | 6.5% |
| Kentucky | 3.2% | 5.2% | 4.8% | 3.6% | 3.2% | 2.3% | 1.8% | 1.3% | 0.8% | 0.6% | 0.5% | 0.6% | 0.5% | 0.9% | 0.9% | 2.0% | 3.2% |
| Louisiana | 13.2% | 11.4% | 8.5% | 5.8% | 4.4% | 3.8% | 3.2% | 2.6% | 1.8% | 1.2% | 1.1% | 0.9% | 1.1% | 2.0% | 2.1% | 2.6% | 3.8% |
| Maine | 5.5% | 6.0% | 7.8% | 9.1% | 11.9% | 13.4% | 14.9% | 14.0% | 12.6% | 9.9% | 8.2% | 6.2% | 4.3% | 3.9% | 3.0% | 2.9% | 3.4% |
| Maryland | 8.8% | 11.3% | 10.7% | 8.9% | 9.0% | 7.9% | 8.1% | 7.1% | 5.9% | 4.5% | 3.7% | 3.0% | 3.2% | 4.6% | 6.6% | 9.8% | 13.9% |
| Massachusetts | 16.5% | 21.1% | 24.2% | 24.9% | 29.4% | 30.2% | 31.5% | 28.3% | 25.1% | 19.9% | 15.4% | 11.2% | 8.7% | 8.7% | 9.5% | 12.2% | 15.0% |
| Michigan | 13.8% | 19.9% | 22.6% | 23.7% | 26.0% | 22.4% | 21.3% | 19.9% | 17.6% | 13.1% | 9.5% | 6.8% | 4.8% | 4.5% | 3.8% | 5.3% | 6.0% |
| Minnesota | 32.5% | 34.1% | 36.5% | 34.3% | 35.9% | 28.9% | 26.2% | 20.4% | 15.2% | 10.6% | 7.1% | 4.2% | 2.6% | 2.6% | 2.6% | 5.3% | 7.1% |
| Mississippi | 0.8% | 1.1% | 1.4% | 0.8% | 0.6% | 0.5% | 0.5% | 0.5% | 0.4% | 0.3% | 0.4% | 0.4% | 0.4% | 0.9% | 0.8% | 1.4% | 2.1% |
| Missouri | 11.2% | 13.6% | 12.9% | 9.8% | 8.8% | 7.0% | 7.0% | 5.5% | 4.2% | 3.0% | 2.3% | 1.8% | 1.4% | 1.7% | 1.6% | 2.7% | 3.9% |
| Montana | | | 38.7% | 29.4% | 32.6% | 27.6% | 25.2% | 17.4% | 14.1% | 10.1% | 7.4% | 4.5% | 2.8% | 2.3% | 1.7% | 1.8% | 2.0% |
| Nebraska | | 22.0% | 25.0% | 21.5% | 19.1% | 16.6% | 14.8% | 11.6% | 8.7% | 6.2% | 4.4% | 2.9% | 1.9% | 2.0% | 1.8% | 4.4% | 6.1% |
| Nevada | | 30.1% | 44.2% | 41.2% | 32.1% | 23.8% | 24.1% | 20.7% | 16.6% | 10.0% | 6.7% | 4.6% | 3.7% | 6.7% | 8.7% | 15.8% | 18.8% |
| New Hampshire | 4.5% | 6.4% | 9.3% | 13.3% | 19.2% | 21.4% | 22.5% | 20.6% | 17.8% | 13.9% | 10.9% | 7.4% | 5.0% | 4.4% | 3.7% | 4.4% | 5.3% |
| New Jersey | 12.2% | 18.3% | 20.9% | 19.6% | 22.8% | 22.9% | 26.0% | 23.5% | 21.0% | 16.8% | 13.2% | 10.1% | 8.9% | 10.3% | 12.5% | 17.5% | 21.0% |
| New Mexico | 3.5% | 7.2% | 6.1% | 6.7% | 7.3% | 7.0% | 7.1% | 8.3% | 5.7% | 2.9% | 2.6% | 2.3% | 2.2% | 4.0% | 5.3% | 8.2% | 9.9% |
| (New York (state)) New York | 21.2% | 25.8% | 26.0% | 23.8% | 26.2% | 26.1% | 30.2% | 27.2% | 25.9% | 21.6% | 17.4% | 13.6% | 11.6% | 13.6% | 15.9% | 20.4% | 22.2% |
| North Carolina | 0.3% | 0.3% | 0.3% | 0.3% | 0.2% | 0.2% | 0.3% | 0.3% | 0.3% | 0.3% | 0.4% | 0.5% | 0.6% | 1.3% | 1.7% | 5.3% | 7.5% |
| North Dakota | | | | | 44.6% | 35.4% | 27.1% | 20.4% | 15.5% | 11.6% | 7.8% | 4.7% | 3.0% | 2.3% | 1.5% | 1.9% | 2.5% |
| Ohio | 11.0% | 14.0% | 14.0% | 12.3% | 12.5% | 11.0% | 12.6% | 11.8% | 9.8% | 7.5% | 5.6% | 4.1% | 3.0% | 2.8% | 2.4% | 3.0% | 4.1% |
| Oklahoma | | | | | 4.4% | 2.6% | 2.4% | 2.0% | 1.3% | 0.9% | 0.8% | 0.9% | 0.8% | 1.9% | 2.1% | 3.8% | 5.5% |
| Oregon | 7.7% | 9.8% | 12.8% | 17.5% | 18.3% | 15.9% | 16.8% | 13.7% | 11.6% | 8.3% | 5.6% | 4.0% | 3.2% | 4.1% | 4.9% | 8.5% | 9.8% |
| Pennsylvania | 13.1% | 14.8% | 15.5% | 13.7% | 16.1% | 15.6% | 18.8% | 16.0% | 12.9% | 9.9% | 7.5% | 5.3% | 3.8% | 3.4% | 3.1% | 4.1% | 5.8% |
| Rhode Island | 16.2% | 21.4% | 25.5% | 26.8% | 30.8% | 31.4% | 33.0% | 29.0% | 25.0% | 19.5% | 14.4% | 10.0% | 7.8% | 8.9% | 9.5% | 11.4% | 12.8% |
| South Carolina | 1.3% | 1.4% | 1.1% | 0.8% | 0.5% | 0.4% | 0.4% | 0.4% | 0.3% | 0.3% | 0.3% | 0.5% | 0.6% | 1.5% | 1.4% | 2.9% | 4.7% |
| South Dakota | | 36.7% | 34.0% | 38.3% | 27.7% | 22.0% | 17.3% | 13.0% | 9.5% | 6.9% | 4.7% | 2.7% | 1.6% | 1.4% | 1.1% | 1.8% | 2.7% |
| Tennessee | 0.6% | 1.9% | 1.5% | 1.1% | 1.1% | 0.9% | 0.9% | 0.7% | 0.5% | 0.4% | 0.4% | 0.4% | 0.5% | 1.1% | 1.2% | 2.8% | 4.5% |
| Texas | 8.3% | 7.2% | 7.6% | 7.2% | 6.8% | 5.9% | 6.2% | 7.8% | 6.2% | 3.7% | 3.6% | 3.1% | 2.8% | 6.0% | 9.0% | 13.9% | 16.4% |
| Utah | 18.0% | 31.7% | 35.4% | 30.6% | 25.5% | 19.4% | 17.6% | 13.2% | 9.5% | 6.0% | 4.5% | 3.6% | 2.8% | 3.5% | 3.4% | 7.1% | 8.0% |
| Vermont | 10.7% | 10.4% | 14.3% | 12.3% | 13.3% | 13.0% | 14.0% | 12.6% | 12.0% | 8.8% | 7.6% | 6.0% | 4.2% | 4.1% | 3.1% | 3.8% | 4.4% |
| Virginia | 1.6% | 2.2% | 1.1% | 1.0% | 1.1% | 1.0% | 1.3% | 1.4% | 1.0% | 0.9% | 1.1% | 1.2% | 1.6% | 3.3% | 5.0% | 8.1% | 11.4% |
| (Washington (state)) Washington | | 27.1% | 21.0% | 21.0% | 25.8% | 21.5% | 22.4% | 19.6% | 16.3% | 12.1% | 8.3% | 6.3% | 4.6% | 5.8% | 6.6% | 10.4% | 13.1% |
| West Virginia | | | 3.9% | 3.0% | 2.5% | 2.3% | 4.7% | 4.2% | 3.0% | 2.2% | 1.7% | 1.3% | 1.0% | 1.1% | 0.9% | 1.1% | 1.2% |
| Wisconsin | 36.2% | 35.7% | 34.6% | 30.8% | 30.8% | 24.9% | 22.0% | 17.5% | 13.2% | 9.2% | 6.3% | 4.3% | 3.0% | 2.7% | 2.5% | 3.6% | 4.5% |
| Wyoming | | | 38.5% | 28.1% | 24.6% | 18.8% | 19.9% | 13.7% | 10.3% | 6.8% | 4.6% | 2.9% | 2.1% | 2.0% | 1.7% | 2.3% | 2.8% |

== See also ==
- Americans
- Anti-Catholicism#United States
  - Anti-Catholicism in the United States
    - History of the Catholic Church in the United States
- Antisemitism by country#United States
  - Antisemitism in the United States
    - History of antisemitism#United States
      - History of antisemitism in the United States
        - History of the Jews in the United States
- Colorism#United States
- Discrimination in the United States
- Guest worker program
- History of civil rights in the United States
- Human rights in the United States
- Hyphenated American
- List of United States immigration laws
- Nativism (politics)#United States
  - Nativism in United States politics
- Race and ethnicity in the United States
  - Historical racial and ethnic demographics of the United States
- Racism by country#United States
  - Racism in the United States
    - Racism against African Americans
    - Racism against Native Americans in the United States
- Religion in the United States
  - Freedom of religion in the United States
    - History of religion in the United States
      - Religious discrimination in the United States
- United States immigration statistics
- White backlash#United States
- White flight#United States
- White nationalism#United States
  - White nationalism in the United States
- White supremacy#United States
  - White supremacy in the United States
- Xenophobia#United States
  - Xenophobia in the United States

=== Ethnic groups ===
- European Americans
  - Albanian Americans
  - Austrian Americans
  - Basque Americans
  - Belarusian Americans
  - Belgian Americans
  - Bosnian Americans
  - Breton Americans
  - British Americans
  - Bulgarian Americans
  - Catalan Americans
  - Cornish Americans
  - Croatian Americans
  - Czech Americans
  - Danish Americans
  - Dutch Americans
  - English Americans
  - Estonian Americans
  - Faroese Americans
  - Finnish Americans
  - French Americans
  - German Americans
  - Greek Americans
  - Greenlandic Americans
  - Hungarian Americans
  - Icelandic Americans
  - Irish Americans
  - Italian Americans
  - Kosovan Americans
  - Latvian Americans
  - Lithuanian Americans
  - Macedonian Americans
  - Maltese Americans
  - Manx Americans
  - Moldovan Americans
  - Montenegrin Americans
  - Norwegian Americans
  - Polish Americans
  - Portuguese Americans
  - Romanian Americans
  - Russian Americans
  - Scottish Americans
  - Serbian Americans
  - Slovak Americans
  - Slovenian Americans
  - Swedish Americans
  - Ukrainian Americans
  - Spanish Americans
  - Welsh Americans
  - Yugoslav Americans
- Middle Eastern Americans
  - Arab Americans
  - Armenian Americans
  - Assyrian Americans
  - Azerbaijani Americans
  - Baloch Americans
  - Berber Americans
  - Chechen Americans
  - Circassian Americans
  - Egyptian Americans
  - Emirati Americans
  - Georgian Americans
  - Iranian Americans
  - Iraqi Americans
  - Israeli Americans
  - Jewish Americans
  - Jordanian Americans
  - Kurdish Americans
  - Kuwaiti Americans
  - Moroccan Americans
  - Pashtun Americans
  - Saudi Americans
  - Syrian Americans
  - Tajik Americans
  - Turkish Americans
  - Uyghur Americans
  - Uzbek Americans
  - Yemeni Americans
- African Americans
  - Central Africans in the United States
  - East Africans in the United States
  - Southern Africans in the United States
  - West Africans in the United States
- Native Americans
  - Alaska Natives
- Asian Americans
  - Bangladeshi Americans
    - Bengali Americans
  - Bhutanese Americans
  - Burmese Americans
    - Karen Americans
  - Cambodian Americans
  - Chinese Americans
    - Taiwanese Americans
    - Tibetan Americans
  - Filipino Americans
  - Hmong Americans
  - Indian Americans
    - Gujarati Americans
    - Tamil Americans
    - Telugu Americans
  - Indonesian Americans
  - Iu Mien Americans
  - Japanese Americans
    - Ryukyuan Americans
  - Kalmyk Americans
  - Kazakh Americans
  - Korean Americans
  - Kyrgyz Americans
  - Laotian Americans
  - Malaysian Americans
  - Maldivian Americans
  - Mongolian Americans
  - Nepalese Americans
  - Pakistani Americans
    - Punjabi Americans
    - Sindhi Americans
  - Romani Americans
  - Sri Lankan Americans
  - Thai Americans
  - Turkmen Americans
  - Vietnamese Americans
- Pacific Islander Americans
  - Fijian Americans
  - French Polynesian Americans
  - Māori Americans
  - Marshallese Americans
  - Micronesian Americans
  - Native Hawaiians
  - Palauan Americans
  - Samoan Americans
  - Tongan Americans
- Hispanic and Latino Americans
  - Argentine Americans
  - Belizean Americans
  - Bolivian Americans
  - Brazilian Americans
  - Chilean Americans
  - Colombian Americans
  - Costa Rican Americans
  - Cuban Americans
  - Ecuadorian Americans
  - Guatemalan Americans
  - Guyanese Americans
  - Honduran Americans
  - Mexican Americans
  - Nicaraguan Americans
  - Panamanian Americans
  - Peruvian Americans
  - Salvadoran Americans
  - Stateside Puerto Ricans
  - Surinamese Americans
  - Venezuelan Americans
- West Indian Americans
  - Antiguan and Barbudan Americans
  - Bahamian Americans
  - Barbadian Americans
  - Bermudian Americans
  - Dominican Americans
  - Garifuna Americans
  - Grenadian Americans
  - Haitian Americans
  - Jamaican Americans
  - Kittian and Nevisian Americans
  - Saint Lucian Americans
  - Trinidadian and Tobagonian Americans
  - Vincentian Americans
- Oceanian Americans
  - Australian Americans
  - New Zealand Americans
