= Leonne Theodore-John =

Saint Lucian politician and diplomat

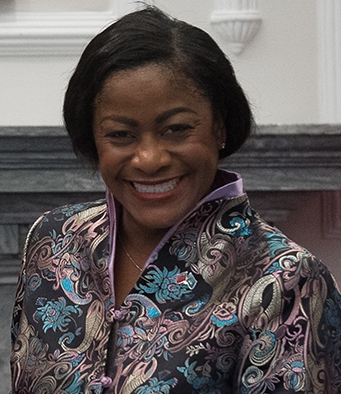

President of the Senate of Saint Lucia
- In office April 2010 – December 2011
- Prime Minister: Stephenson King
- Preceded by: Gail V. Philip
- Succeeded by: Claudius Francis

Speaker of the House of Assembly of Saint Lucia
- In office 12 July 2016 – 1 March 2018
- Prime Minister: Allen Chastanet
- Preceded by: Peter Foster
- Succeeded by: Andy Daniel

Deputy High Commissioner to the United Kingdom
- In office 2018 – February 2022

Personal details
- Party: United Workers Party
- Education: University of Wolverhampton; University of Northumbria

Leonne Theodore-John is a Saint Lucian politician, who was President of the Senate of Saint Lucia from April 2010 to December 2011. She was also Speaker of the House of Assembly from 12 July 2016 to 1 March 2018, when she resigned the position. During her time as speaker she supported diplomatic relations between Taiwan and Saint Lucia. She has also undertaken the role of Commissioner on the Constituencies Boundaries Commission of Saint Lucia. From 2018 to February 2022 she held the office of Deputy High Commissioner to the United Kingdom.

Educated at the University of Wolverhampton, from where she was awarded a BA in law, and the University of Northumbria, where she was awarded a PGDip in Law, she was admitted to the Bar in 2005. First to the Bar of England and Wales in July, then subsequently to the Bar of the Eastern Caribbean Supreme Court in September of the same year.

She is a member of United Workers Party.
