= Andy Daniel =

Saint Lucian politician

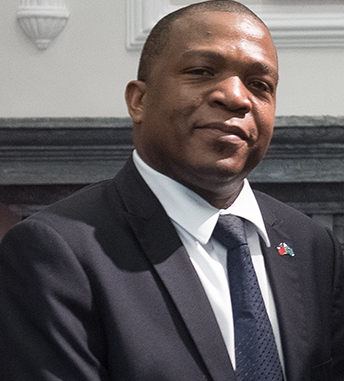

Speaker of the House of Assembly of Saint Lucia
- In office 20 March 2018 – July 2021
- Prime Minister: Allen Chastanet
- Preceded by: Leonne Theodore-John
- Succeeded by: Claudius Francis

President of the Senate of Saint Lucia
- In office 12 July 2016 – 20 March 2018
- Prime Minister: Allen Chastanet
- Preceded by: Claudius Francis
- Succeeded by: Jeannine Michele Giraudy-McIntyre

Personal details
- Born: Andy Glenn Daniel; 8 October 1971 (age 54)
- Party: United Workers Party

Andy Daniel is a Saint Lucian politician, who was Speaker of the House of Assembly from March 2018 to July 2021. He is a member of the United Workers Party. He is an attorney and former magistrate.

Daniel was born on 8 October 1971. He studied law in Holborn College in London. He returned to Saint Lucia in 1999 where he practiced law. Daniel served as the leader of the opposition in the Senate of Saint Lucia, and was appointed as the President of the Senate from July 2016 to March 2018.
