= Hilford Deterville =

Saint Lucian politician

President of the Senate of Saint Lucia
- In office 1997–2007
- Prime Minister: Kenny Anthony
- Preceded by: Neville Cenac
- Succeeded by: Rosemary Husbands-Mathurin

Personal details
- Born: Hilford David Alexander Deterville; 1944
- Died: 2014 (aged 69–70) Canada
- Party: Saint Lucia Labour Party

Hilford Deterville Q.C. (1944–2014) was a Saint Lucian politician who was president of the Senate of Saint Lucia from 1997 to 2007.

He was born on 26 August 1944. He graduated from the University of West Indies in 1973. He was a lawyer, former president of the bar association, and a former electoral commissioner.

Deterville was a member of Saint Lucia Labour Party. He was appointed as President of the Senate of Saint Lucia in 1997. He continued as Senate President in December 2006, and was succeeded as president by Rosemary Husbands-Mathurin in early 2007.

Deterville died in late 2014 in Canada.
