= Jessica St. Rose =

Saint Lucian human rights activist

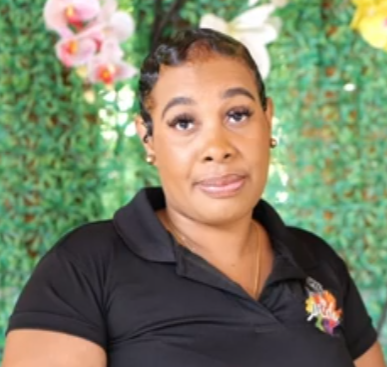
- St. Rose in a 2024 interview
- Education: University of the West Indies
- Occupation: Activist

Jessica St. Rose is a Saint Lucian human rights activist. A member of the LGBTQ community, St. Rose played a key role in creating Saint Lucia Pride, the country's first pride parade.

== Biography ==
St. Rose was raised by her grandparents in Babonneau, Saint Lucia. She attended Castries Comprehensive Secondary School and the Sir Arthur Lewis Community College before graduating from the University of the West Indies. After graduating, she worked as a compliance officer for the National Insurance Corporation.

In 2005, St. Rose came out publicly as gay. Inspired by her fellow Saint Lucian Kenita Placide, St. Rose became an activist in the LGBTI community, becoming a member of United and Strong, Saint Lucia's first LGBTI organisation; she went on serve as its board secretary. Through her role with United and Strong, St. Rose co-ordinated the Caribbean Women's Sexual and Diversity Conference, delivered training to the Royal Saint Lucia Police Force on supporting LGBTI people, and provided outreach support and education on HIV/AIDS. In 2025, St. Rose criticised plans by Donald Trump, the President of the United States, to cut funding to the Emergency Plan for AIDS Relief, which would disrupt access to free medication for people living in Saint Lucia with HIV and AIDS.

St. Rose has campaigned for Saint Lucia's colonial-era Buggery Law to be removed. When the Eastern Caribbean Supreme Court struck down the law in 2025, St. Rose described as a "momentous legal change" that sent a message that "love is not a crime" in Saint Lucia.

In 2019, St. Rose founded 758 Pride with the aim of establishing a pride parade in Saint Lucia. Saint Lucia Pride was first held in 2019 in Castries; in 2024, it held its sixth parade which featured Saint Lucian American drag queen Monet X Change. At Saint Lucia Pride's 2025 edition, the Pride Flag was raised officially in Saint Lucia for the first time at the Résidence de France, which St. Rose described as "very important for the community".

St. Rose is the co-founder of the regional Women in Leadership organisation and the Caribbean representative on the International Lesbian, Gay, Bisexual, Trans and Intersex Association. She also served for two years on the board of the Women's Secretariat.
