= Wilfred St. Clair-Daniel =

Saint Lucian lawyer and politician (1923–2013)

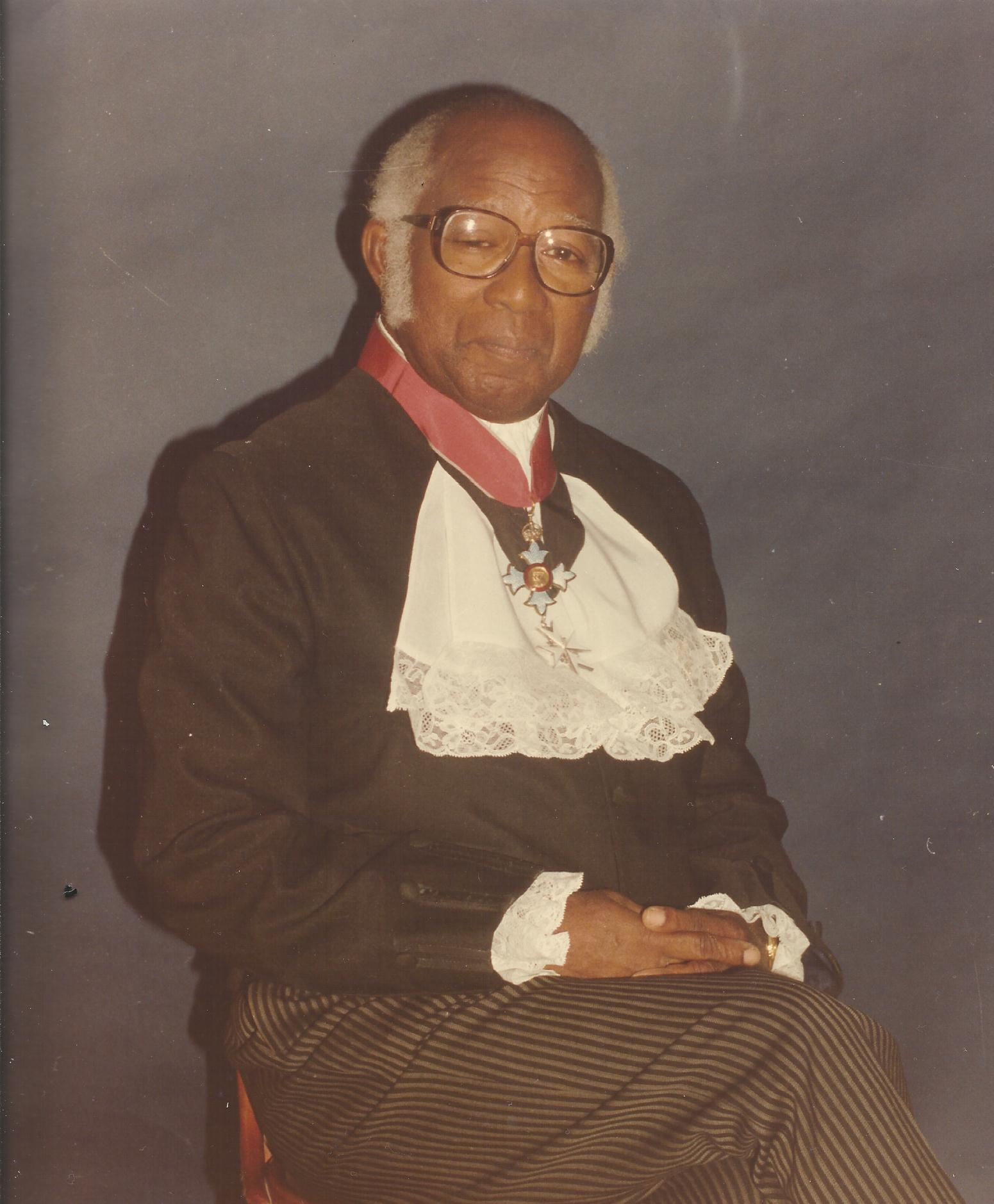

Speaker of the House of Assembly of Saint Lucia
- In office June 1982 – May 1997
- Prime Minister: John Compton
- Preceded by: Donald Alcee
- Succeeded by: Matthew Roberts

Speaker of the House of Assembly of Saint Lucia
- In office May 1967 – July 1979
- Prime Minister: John Compton; Vaughan Lewis
- Preceded by: Frederick Clarke
- Succeeded by: Clarence Rambally

Personal details
- Party: United Workers Party; People's Progressive Party

Wilfred St. Clair-Daniel CBE (June 1923 – February 2013) was a politician and former Speaker of the House of Assembly of Saint Lucia.

St. Clair-Daniel served as the Speaker of the House of Assembly of Saint Lucia for 27 years, making him the longest to serve in that position to date. He was first elected Speaker in 1967, on the recommendation of then Premier of Saint Lucia, the late Hon. Sir John Compton, and served continuously until 1979. Due to the surprise defeat of the United Workers Party at the polls in 1979, a new SLP-Administration under Sir Allan Louisy took the reins of power, which resulted in a new Speaker being elected. After three years of governance, the Labour Administration of 1979 eventually fell apart, thus paving the way for general elections in 1982.

The United Workers Party was returned to power, Sir John G. M. Compton once again sworn in as Prime Minister, and Mr. St. Clair-Daniel was returned as Speaker of the House of Assembly, where he then served for 15 years, ending in 1997.
