= List of speakers of the House of Assembly of Saint Lucia =

List of speakers of the House of Assembly of Saint Lucia.

== Speakers of the Legislative Council ==
Name	Took office	Left office	Notes
Hon. Clive Marie Compton	July 1961	1964	
Hon. Frederick Clarke	March 1964	1967	

== Speakers of the House of Assembly ==
Name	Took office	Left office	Notes
Hon. Wilfred St. Clair-Daniel	May 1967	July 1979	
Hon. Clarence Rambally	July 1979	August 1981	
Hon. Donald Alcee	August 1981	June 1982	
Hon. Wilfred St. Clair-Daniel	June 1982	May 1997	
Hon. Matthew Roberts	July 1997	March 2003	
Hon. Joseph Baden Allain	April 2003	November 2006	
Hon. Sarah Flood-Beaubrun	10 January 2007	November 2008	
Hon. Rosemary Husbands-Mathurin	November 2008	November 2011	
Hon. Peter Foster	5 January 2012	May 2016	
Hon. Leonne Theodore-John	July 2016	March 2018	
Hon. Andy Daniel	20 March 2018	July 2021	
Hon. Claudius Francis	17 August 2021	Present	

== See also ==
- House of Assembly of Saint Lucia
