= Rosemary Husbands-Mathurin =

Saint Lucian politician

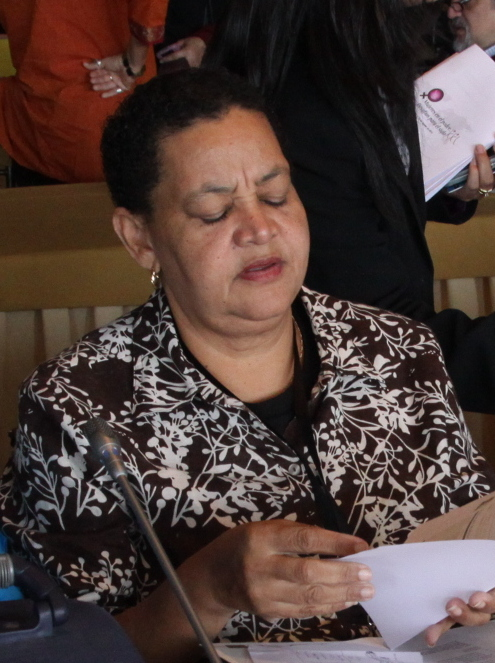

Speaker of the House of Assembly of Saint Lucia
- In office November 2008 – November 2011
- Prime Minister: Stephenson King
- Preceded by: Sarah Flood-Beaubrun
- Succeeded by: Peter Irvin Foster

President of the Senate of Saint Lucia
- In office 9 January 2007 – 2008
- Prime Minister: John Compton; Stephenson King
- Preceded by: Hilford Deterville
- Succeeded by: Everistus Jean Marie

Rosemary Husbands-Mathurin MBE is a Saint Lucian politician. Husbands-Mathurin served as president of the Senate from January 2007 to 2008, and speaker of the House of Assembly from November 2008 to November 2011. She was appointed parliamentary commissioner in 2017 and 2022.

She was appointed Member of the Order of the British Empire (MBE) in the 2022 Birthday Honours.
