= Sir Arthur Lewis Community College =

Community college in Castries, Saint Lucia

- Established: 1985
- Location: Morne Fortune, Castries, Saint Lucia; 13.9978°N 60.9949°W
- Website: www.salcc.edu.lc

Sir Arthur Lewis Community College (SALCC) is a community college in the island country of Saint Lucia. The college was established in 1985 and is named after Saint Lucian economist and Nobel laureate Sir Arthur Lewis.

== Notable alumni ==
- Sarah Flood-Beaubrun, former Member of Parliament and Government Minister
- Gale Rigobert, Member of Parliament for Micoud North
- Jessica St. Rose, LGBTQ activist
