= List of presidents of the Senate of Saint Lucia =

The following have served as presidents of the Senate of Saint Lucia.

Name	Took office	Left office	Notes
Hon. Vincent Floissac	22 February 1979	1979	
Hon. Calixte George	7 July 1979	1982	
Hon. Emmanuel Henry Giraudy, OBE	June 1982	1993	
Hon. Neville Cenac	October 1993	16 June 1997	
Hon. Hilford Deterville	17 June 1997	2007	
Hon. Rosemary Husbands-Mathurin	10 January 2007	November 2008	
Hon. Everistus Jean Marie	November 2008	December 2008	Acting
Hon. Gail V. Philip	23 December 2008	April 2010	
Hon. Leonne Theodore-John	April 2010	December 2011	
Hon. Claudius J. Francis	5 January 2012	2016	
Hon. Andy Daniel	12 July 2016	20 March 2018	
Hon. Jeannine Giraudy-McIntyre	20 March 2018	July 2021	
Hon. Stanley Felix	17 August 2021	October 2022	
Hon. Alvina Reynolds	24 November 2022	Incumbent	

== See also ==
- Senate of Saint Lucia
