= Sarah Flood-Beaubrun =

Saint Lucian lawyer and politician

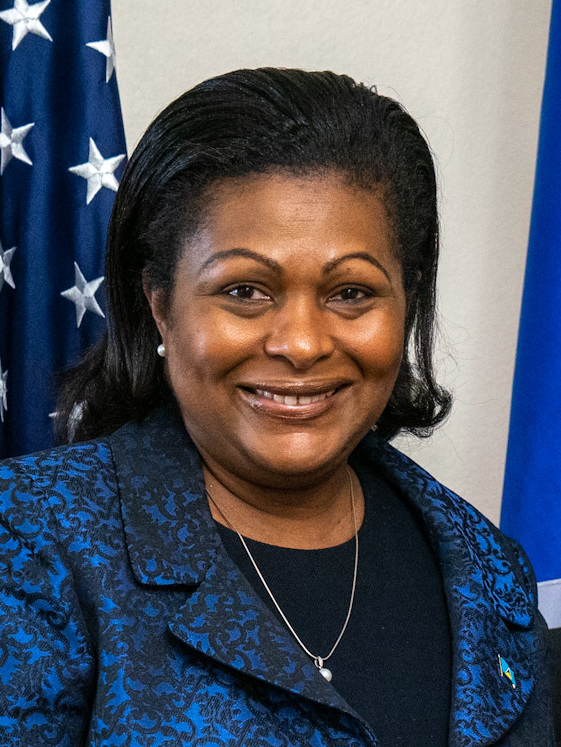

Member of Parliament for Castries Central
- In office 1997–2006
- In office 2016–2021

Minister of Health, Human Services, Family Affairs and Gender Relations
- In office 1997–2001

Minister of Home Affairs and Gender Relations
- In office 2001–2006

Speaker of the House of Assembly
- In office 9 January 2007 – November 2008
- Prime Minister: John Compton; Stephenson King
- Preceded by: Joseph Baden Allain
- Succeeded by: Rosemary Husbands-Mathurin

Personal details
- Born: Sarah Flood; 8 January 1969 (age 57)
- Party: United Workers Party (Saint Lucia)
- Education: Castries Comprehensive Secondary School, Sir Arthur Lewis Community College, University of Hull and University of Westminster

Sarah Flood-Beaubrun (born 8 January 1969) is a Saint Lucian lawyer and politician. Beaubrun is the former representative for the constituency of Castries Central in the House of Assembly. Beaubrun lost her seat in the 2021 Saint Lucian General Election dubbed a landslide victory for the Saint Lucia Labour Party.

== Education ==
Flood-Beaubrun who is a mother of two was educated at the Castries Comprehensive Secondary School and Sir Arthur Lewis Community College in St. Lucia and subsequently at the University of Hull where she obtained a Bachelor of Laws (LLB-Hons). She did post-graduate Law at the University of Westminster, leading to a degree of Utter Barrister, and was called to the Bar of England and Wales (1995) and the Bar of the Organization of Eastern Caribbean Supreme Court (1995).

== Political career ==
She was elected as a Member of Parliament in 1997 to represent the Castries Central constituency, beating the then sitting prime minister, and was subsequently re-elected in 2001. The election of Flood-Beaubrun and Menissa Rambally in 1997 and 2001, according to Cynthia Barrow-Giles, "transformed the St Lucia lower House of parliament from a virtual 'all boys camp' to a more gender integrated elected parliament". Flood-Beaubrun served as minister of health, human services, family affairs and gender relations in the SLP administration during the first term and during the second term as Minister of Home Affairs and Gender Relations.

Flood-Beaubrun again contested and won the Castries Central seat on the United Workers Party ticket in the 2016 general election. She was elected Deputy Speaker of the House of Assembly on 12 July 2016. Beaubrun would go on to lose her seat in the 2021 Saint Lucian General Election.

== Leadership ==
In her various capacities as a minister from 1997 to 2004, Flood-Beaubrun oversaw the construction of the first new correctional institution in St. Lucia for over 100 years, the complete upgrading and revamping to international standards of the main intake area of the islands primary medical institution, the establishment of the 1st women’s support center for abused women, the creation of the 1st Mother to Child HIV prevention of transmission program in St. Lucia, plus other programs. Under her focus and leadership, she brought a new concentration on the ignored issues of mental health treatment and incarceration of the mentally challenged in St. Lucia. This focus and spotlighting subsequently led to the establishment of a new mental health institution in St. Lucia.

Following the general election in December 2006, Flood-Beaubrun was historically selected as St. Lucia's first female Speaker of the House of Assembly effective 9 January 2007.

== Other Office ==
Flood-Beaubrun in September 2008 was subsequently appointed Deputy Permanent Representative for St. Lucia at the United Nations in New York and was succeeded in the role of Speaker of the House of Assembly by another woman, Rosemary Husbands-Mathurin.

== Advocacy ==
Flood-Beaubrun has established a strong reputation in St. Lucia, the Caribbean and internationally as a persuasive defender of human rights and dignity. She has spoken in various Caribbean forum on these issues and their relation to good governance in the region.
