= Stanley Felix =

Saint Lucian politician

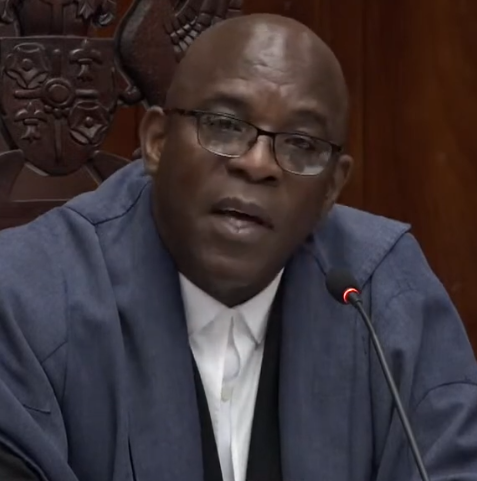

President of the Senate of Saint Lucia
- In office 17 August 2021 – 23 November 2022
- Prime Minister: Philip J. Pierre
- Preceded by: Jeannine Giraudy-McIntyre
- Succeeded by: Alvina Reynolds

Personal details
- Born: 27 May 1963 (age 62)
- Party: Saint Lucia Labour Party until ca. 2022-2025
- Occupation: attorney

Stanley Felix (born 27 May 1963) is a Saint Lucian politician and former cabinet minister and President of the Senate.

Felix has studied in The College of Law of England and Wales in London, and New York University. He is an attorney at law. He was an unsuccessful Saint Lucia Labour Party (SLP) candidate for Castries Central constituency in the elections of 2011 and 2016. He was Minister of Physical Development, Housing and Urban Renewal in SLP administration from 2011 to 2016.

Felix was appointed President of the Senate of Saint Lucia on 17 August 2021. However, his appointment was revoked by Prime Minister Philip J. Pierre on 23 November 2022 amid "perversion of justice" charges. In March 2024 the case against him was dismissed. In October 2025 Felix declared candidacy to Castries Central constituency in the next general elections.
