= Jeannine Giraudy-McIntyre =

Saint Lucian politician

Jeannine Michele Giraudy-McIntyre
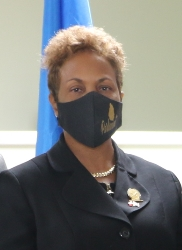
- Giraudy-McIntyre in 2020

President of the Senate of Saint Lucia
- In office 20 March 2018 – July 2021
- Prime Minister: Allen Chastanet
- Preceded by: Andy Daniel
- Succeeded by: Stanley Felix

Personal details
- Party: United Workers Party

Jeannine Michele Giraudy-McIntyre is a Saint Lucian politician who was president of the Senate of Saint Lucia from March 2018 to July 2021. She is a member of the United Workers Party (UWP).

Giraudy-McIntyre is a daughter of late co-founder of the UWP, Emmanuel Henry Giraudy. She is an attorney-at-law. She is currently general secretary of the UWP.
