= Claudius Francis =

Saint Lucian politician

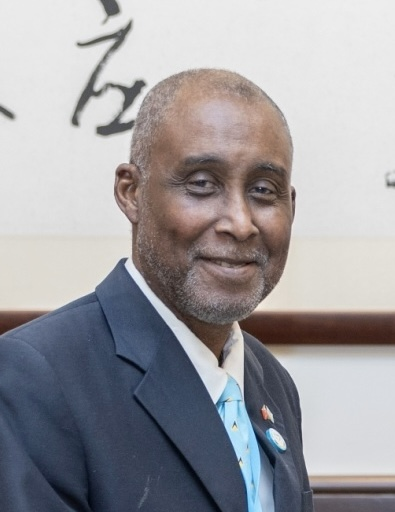

12th Speaker of the House of Assembly of Saint Lucia
- Incumbent
- Assumed office 17 August 2021
- Prime Minister: Philip J. Pierre
- Preceded by: Andy Daniel

10th President of the Senate of Saint Lucia
- In office 5 January 2012 – 19 May 2016
- Prime Minister: Kenny Anthony
- Preceded by: Leonne Theodore-John
- Succeeded by: Andy Daniel

Personal details
- Born: Claudius James Francis; 3 June 1959
- Party: Saint Lucia Labour Party

Claudius James Francis (born 3 June 1959) is a Saint Lucian television talk show host and politician, who has been Speaker of the House of Assembly since 2021. He was President of the Senate from 2012 to 2016. Francis is the former chairman of the Saint Lucia Labour Party.

Francis is the host of Straight Up with Claudius Francis on HTS Channel 4.
