= Peter Irvin Foster =

Saint Lucian politician

Peter Foster

Speaker of the House of Assembly of Saint Lucia
- In office 6 January 2012 – 19 May 2016
- Prime Minister: Kenny Anthony
- Preceded by: Rosemary Husbands-Mathurin
- Succeeded by: Leonne Theodore-John

Personal details
- Born: Peter Irvin Foster
- Occupation: lawyer

Peter Foster (KC) is a Saint Lucian lawyer and politician.

He has a Bachelor of Arts in law degree from the University of North London. He has worked as a lawyer, on a private practice since 1983. He was called to the bar in London, England and in Castries, Saint Lucia, in 1983. He has also served as a temporary magistrate in Saint Lucia. He has also been a judge of the Eastern Caribbean Supreme Court. He has also served as a High Court Judge in the British Virgin Islands and in Anguilla. He is a former chairman of the Castries City Corporation and director of St. Lucia Electricity Services Company.

On 6 January 2012, he was elected to serve as Speaker of the House of Assembly, during the government of Kenny Anthony. He served until 19 May 2016.

In July 2012 he was appointed Queen’s Counsel.

Since 2021 he has been a judge in the Court of Appeal of Belize.
