= Kaygianna Toussaint-Charley =

Saint Lucian politician

Member of the Senate of Saint Lucia
- Incumbent
- Assumed office 2021

Personal details
- Party: Saint Lucia Labour Party

Kaygianna Toussaint-Charley is a Saint Lucian politician who serves as a member of the Senate of Saint Lucia.
