= Alvina Reynolds =

Saint Lucian politician

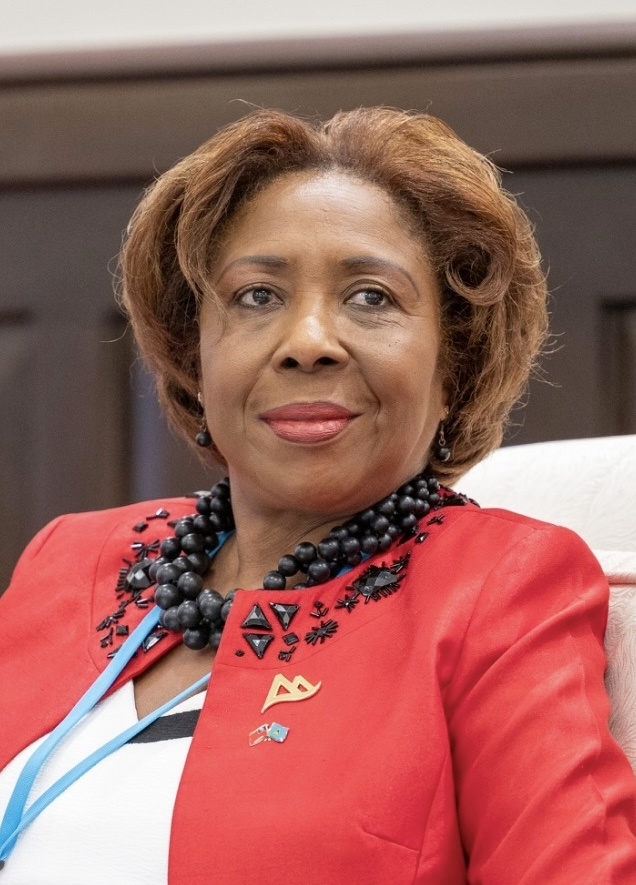
- Official portrait, 2024

14th President of the Senate of Saint Lucia
- Incumbent
- Assumed office 24 November 2022
- Prime Minister: Philip J. Pierre
- Preceded by: Stanley Felix

Personal details
- Born: 21 June 1968 (age 57)
- Party: Saint Lucia Labour Party

Alvina Reynolds (born 21 June 1968) is a Saint Lucian politician who has been president of the Senate of Saint Lucia since 2022. She represented the Babonneau constituency for the Saint Lucia Labour Party from 2011 to 2016. She is the first female Member of Parliament for that area. She was the Minister for Health, Wellness, Human Services and Gender Relations. She won her seat in the 2011 general election and lost the seat in the 2016 general election. She was appointed as a government member of the senate on 28 July 2021 and became senate president on 24 November 2022.

Reynolds graduated with a Bachelor of Philosophy in Education (BPhil) degree from the University of Birmingham in 1997.
