= Castries Comprehensive Secondary School =

Secondary school in Castries, Saint Lucia

Location
- Vide Bouteille, Castries; Saint Lucia
- Coordinates: 14°01′38″N 60°58′43″W

Information
- Other name: CCSS
- Motto: Look To This Day
- Established: 1974
- Authority: Ministry of Education
- Principal: Marva Daniel
- Teaching staff: Over 30 Teachers
- Grades: Form 1 - Form 5 (5 Years)
- Hours in school day: 8:15 a.m - 2:45 p.m Excluding Public Holidays
- Houses: Amazona, Oriole, Heron and Finch
- Colours: Red, Black and White
- Alumni: CCSS Global Alumni Association
- Website: http://castriescomprehensive.org/

Castries Comprehensive Secondary School is a secondary school located in Vide Bouteille, Castries, Saint Lucia.

The school opened in 1974. It was donated by the Canadian government.

== Notable alumni ==
- Sarah Flood-Beaubrun, former Minister of Home Affairs
- Lenard Montoute, Minister of Youth and Sports and MP for Gros Islet (2006–2011)
- Jessica St. Rose, LGBTQ activist
