= Henry Giraudy =

Saint Lucian politician

Emmanuel Henry Giraudy

President of the Senate of Saint Lucia
- In office June 1982 – 1993
- Prime Minister: John Compton
- Preceded by: Calixte George
- Succeeded by: Neville Cenac

Personal details
- Born: 1923
- Died: 1993 (aged 69–70)
- Party: United Workers Party

Henry Giraudy, O.B.E., Q.C., was a Saint Lucian politician best known as the co-founder and chairman of the United Workers Party (UWP) from 1964 until his death.

Giraudy was born in 1923. He was born and raised in Vieux Fort. He worked as an attorney.

Giraudy was the chairman of the UWP from 1964 until his death in 1993. He was elected to the House of Assembly of Saint Lucia from Vieux Fort constituency in the elections of 1964, 1967 and 1974. He was appointed as the President of the Senate of Saint Lucia in June 1982, and died while in office.

Giraudy was UWP's long-serving party chairman, and he was allegedly the power behind Premier John Compton.

Jeannine Giraudy-McIntyre and Mara Thompson are daughters of Henry.
