= Allison Jean =

Saint Lucian politician

Government Senator
- Incumbent
- Assumed office 2022

Personal details
- Party: Saint Lucia Labour Party

Allison A. Jean is a Saint Lucian politician who is a member of the Senate of Saint Lucia. She was previously permanent secretary in the ministry of infrastructure.
