= Pauline Antoine-Prospere =

Saint Lucian politician

Senator
- Incumbent
- Assumed office 2022

Personal details
- Party: Saint Lucia Labour Party

Pauline Antoine-Prospere is a Saint Lucian politician.

== Biography ==
Pauline Antoine-Prospere was raised in the community of Saltibus and attended the Saltibus Combined School, the Choiseul Secondary and Vieux- Fort Secondary Schools. In 2022, Pauline Antoine-Prospere was appointed to the Senate of Saint Lucia. Antoine-Prospere was the candidate for Choiseul in the House of Assembly of Saint Lucia at the 2021 Saint Lucian general election. She was Parliamentary Secretary Ministry of Education, Sustainable Development, Innovation, Science, Technology and Vocational Training.
