= Lascelles Robotham =

Sir Lascelles Lister Robotham (22 October 1923 – 19 February 1996) was a Jamaican lawyer and judge who worked in a number of Commonwealth countries in the Caribbean. He was Chief Justice of the Eastern Caribbean Supreme Court from 1984 until his retirement in 1991.

== Early life ==
Robotham was educated in law in London. In 1955, he was called to the Bar of England and Wales at Lincoln's Inn. He returned to Jamaica and worked as a Crown lawyer from 1955 to 1962. He became a magistrate in the Jamaican courts in 1962, and was promoted to the position of High Court Judge 1964. In 1976, he became a member of the Jamaican Court of Appeal.

In 1979, Robotham left Jamaica after being appointed to be a High Court Judge of the Eastern Caribbean Supreme Court by the Judicial and Legal Services Commission of the Caribbean Community. His first assignment was to reside in and hear cases from Antigua and Barbuda. He became a Justice of Appeal of the Court in 1982, and in 1984 he became the Chief Justice. As Chief Justice, Robotham was the supreme judicial officer of the courts of Anguilla, Antigua and Barbuda, the British Virgin Islands, Dominica, Grenada, Montserrat, Saint Kitts and Nevis, Saint Lucia, and Saint Vincent and the Grenadines.

Robotham was knighted by Queen Elizabeth II in 1987. He retired in 1991, and was succeeded as Chief Justice by Vincent Floissac. After his retirement from the Caribbean court, he was appointed to be a judge on the Court of Appeal of Belize.
