= Calixte George =

Saint Lucian politician

President of the Senate of Saint Lucia
- In office 1979–1982
- Preceded by: Vincent Floissac
- Succeeded by: Henry Giraudy

Personal details
- Born: Saint Lucia
- Party: SLP
- Education: University of the West Indies at St. Augustine; University of Reading

Calixte George is a Saint Lucian former politician. A member of the Saint Lucia Labour Party, he served as President of the Senate of Saint Lucia from 1979 to 1982. He later served as Minister of Communications, Works, Transport and Public Utilities from 1997 to 2001, and Minister of Agriculture, Forestry and Fisheries from 2001 to 2004.

== Biography ==
George, born in Saint Lucia, attended the Roman Catholic Boys School. He began attending Saint Mary's College on Saint Lucia in 1952 on a scholarship, later graduating in 1958. He was one of the first Saint Lucians to pass chemistry, botany and zoology courses at the higher school certificate level. After he graduated from Saint Mary's, George attended the University of the West Indies at St. Augustine on scholarship, earning a Bachelor of Science in agriculture with general honors. He then attended the University of Reading in the England and graduated in 1966 with a Master of Science in soil science.

After his education, George returned to Saint Lucia and worked in the agriculture industry. He held the positions of Chief Research Officer and Acting Chief Agricultural Officer in the Saint Lucian Ministry of Agriculture. He served as executive director of the Caribbean Agricultural Research and Development Institute and was managing director of the Saint Lucia Banana Growers' Association. In this role, he helped establish the Windward Islands Banana Development and Exporting Company Limited. George was also president of the Saint Lucia Civil Service Association and was a workers' rights activist, contributing to "the largest single salary increase in the history of the Saint Lucian civil service". He wrote a scientific article on "The Sustainability of Soils for Vegetable Production in St. Lucia" in 1969, and wrote a paper for UNESCO, "Science and Technology in the Caribbean", in 1992.

Also active in politics, George was a member of the Saint Lucia Labour Party (SLP) and in 1979, was elected President of the Senate of Saint Lucia. He served in this role through 1982. He later served as the Senate's Leader of Government Business from 1997 to 2006. From 1997 to 2001, he was Minister of Communications, Works, Transport and Public Utilities. George then was named Minister of Agriculture, Forestry and Fisheries in 2001, before being moved to the Ministry of Home Affairs and Internal Security in 2004. He served two terms as Chairman of the Ministers responsible for Telecommunications and also worked as the founding chair of the Eastern Caribbean Telecommunications Authority.

George is married and has five children. He was named a Companion of the Order of St Michael and St George in 2012. He also was named a Knight Commander of the Order of Saint Lucia, and in 2025 received an honorary Doctor of Laws from the University of the West Indies. In 2019, he authored an 800-page book on the history of Saint Mary's College.
