= Gail Philip =

Saint Lucian politician

Gail V. Philip

President of the Senate of Saint Lucia
- In office 23 December 2008 – April 2010
- Prime Minister: Stephenson King
- Preceded by: Everistus Jean Marie
- Succeeded by: Leonne Theodore-John

Personal details
- Born: Gail Vilna Philip
- Occupation: lawyer

Gail Philip is a Saint Lucian lawyer and politician.

She was born in 1971. She has worked as a lawyer. In 2004, she was appointed as member of the Senate as a United Workers Party senator. She was appointed as President of the Senate during the Stephenson King's United Workers Party administration. She was dismissed in 2010.
