= Vincent Floissac =

Saint Lucian jurist and politician (1928–2010)

The Honourable Sir Vincent Frederick Floissac

Chief Justice of the Eastern Caribbean Supreme Court
- In office November 1991 – July 1996
- Preceded by: Lascelles Robotham
- Succeeded by: Dennis Byron

Judge of the Court of Appeal of Seychelles
- In office 1988–1991

Acting Governor-General of Saint Lucia
- In office 30 April 1987 – 10 October 1988

President of the Senate of Saint Lucia
- In office 1979–1979
- Prime Minister: John Compton
- Preceded by: New position
- Succeeded by: Calixte George

Personal details
- Born: 31 July 1928
- Died: 25 September 2010 (aged 82)

Sir Vincent Frederick Floissac CMG OBE PC QC (31 July 1928 – 25 September 2010) was a Saint Lucian jurist and politician. He was styled The Rt. Hon. Sir Vincent Floissac by virtue of his membership of the Privy Council of the United Kingdom.

Floissac was the first judge from St Lucia to sit with the Judicial Committee of the Privy Council.

== Biography ==
Floissac was born on St Lucia on and was educated at Saint Mary's College and University College London and was called to the Bar by Gray's Inn.

Floissac was the first President of the Saint Lucian Senate in 1979 and served as the acting Governor-General of Saint Lucia from 30 April 1987 until 10 October 1988. He then became a member of the Seychellois Court of Appeal from 1988 to 1991. He has also served as Chief Justice and President of the Court of Appeal of the Eastern Caribbean Supreme Court, working in that capacity from November 1991 to July 1996. In this role, Floissac was the supreme judicial officer of the courts of Anguilla, Antigua and Barbuda, the British Virgin Islands, Dominica, Grenada, Montserrat, Saint Kitts and Nevis, Saint Lucia, and Saint Vincent and the Grenadines. He has also represented Saint Lucia in several regional tennis competitions.

Following a lengthy bout with cancer, Floissac died on 25 September 2010, at the age of 82. and is buried in Castries City Cemetery.

== See also ==
- Politics of Saint Lucia

Government offices
Preceded by Allen Montgomery Lewis	Acting Governor-General of Saint Lucia; 1987–1988	Succeeded by Stanislaus A. James
