= Canadian Agreement =

The Canadian Agreement was an 1894 agreement between the United States and signatory transportation companies that prohibited transportation companies from landing immigrants who were barred from entry in the U.S. into Canadian ports.

== Background ==
During the 1880s and 1890s, the U.S. began tightening its immigration laws by barring certain ethnic groups from entering, for example the Chinese. Transportation companies that brought these barred individuals to the U.S. would be responsible for their return to their country of origin. Transportation companies, however, got around this restriction by landing barred people at Canadian ports. The immigrants would then come into the United States through the Canada–United States border. During the mid-to-late nineteenth century, the Canadian immigration route was preferred for Scandinavians, Russians, and other northern Europeans immigrating to Michigan, Wisconsin, Illinois, or other states on the Upper Great Plains. By 1892, Canadian carriers were advertising in Europe that entry at Canadian ports was a hassle-free way to enter the U.S.

== The Policy ==
The agreement was signed September 7, 1893.

The 1894 agreement allowed U.S. immigration inspectors to monitor immigration at Canadian seaports and deny entry into Canada of any immigrant deemed excludable under U.S. immigration law. The U.S. placed inspectors at Quebec, Halifax, Montreal, Vancouver, and Victoria. The U.S. spent approximately twenty years attempting to perfect implementation of the law and the inspection system in Canada.
