= Vincentian Americans =

Americans of Vincentian birth or descent

Total population
- 13,547 (Vincentian ancestry, 2000 US Census); 21,552 (Vincentian-born, 2007–2011)

Regions with significant populations
- Majority in states include New York, Massachusetts, Pennsylvania, Ohio, Michigan, Delaware, Maryland, Virginia, Kentucky, North Carolina, Georgia, Florida, Missouri, Iowa, South Dakota, Mississippi, Louisiana, Oklahoma and Texas; Smaller numbers in other parts of the country including New Jersey, Rhode Island, Connecticut, Minnesota, Washington, Colorado and California

Languages
- English (American English, Vincentian English), Vincentian Creole

Religion
- Christianity

Vincentian Americans are Americans of full or partial Vincentian origin or ancestry. According to the 2000 United States census, 13,547 people in the United States reported Vincentian ancestry.

== History ==
There is a significant Vincentian diaspora in Brooklyn. Vincentians have lived in the New York area since the 1900s. Some Vincentians went to the United States after working on the Panama Canal. There was approximately 50,00 Vincentians living in New York City in 1980. By 1996, the number Vincentian population increased, including large numbers of illegal Vincentian immigrants and long-term visitors from St. Vincent.

In New York, the Brooklyn-based Council of St. Vincent and the Grenadines Organizations, U.S.A., Inc. (COSAGO) acts as an umbrella body for Vincentian associations. With the Consulate General of Saint Vincent and the Grenadines, COSAGO organizes events in Brooklyn churches.

== Demographics ==
The 2000 United States census recorded 13,547 people reporting Vincentian ancestry nationwide. The 2007–2011 American Community Survey 5-year estimates reported 21,552 Vincentian-born residents in the United States.

Within the United States, Vincentian Americans are distributed across a number of states. Vincentian communities are present in New York, Massachusetts, Pennsylvania, Ohio, Michigan, Delaware, Maryland, Virginia, Kentucky, North Carolina, Georgia, Florida, Mississippi, Louisiana, Oklahoma and Texas. New York City hosts the single largest concentration of Vincentian-born residents in the country. According to the New York City Department of City Planning's analysis of the 2011–2015 ACS 5-year estimates, 13,591 foreign-born residents of the city were born in Saint Vincent and the Grenadines. Of these, approximately 1,761 lived in Queens and 24 in Staten Island, with additional Vincentian-born populations in the other boroughs.

== Language ==
Vincentian Americans typically speak English, including American English and Vincentian varieties of English, and may also use Vincentian Creole, an English-lexifier Creole associated with Saint Vincent and the Grenadines.

== Notable people ==
- Gloria Davy, singer
- Adonal Foyle, retired professional basketball center
- Ezra Hendrickson, retired professional soccer midfielder
- Arthur French, actor and director
- Shake Keane, jazz musician and poet
- Sophia Young, professional women's basketball player
- Rajah Caruth, NASCAR driver
- Bobby Shmurda, rapper

== See also ==
- Saint Vincent and the Grenadines–United States relations
