= Saint Lucian Americans =

Americans of Saint Lucian birth or descent

Total population
- 14,592 (2010 US Census)

Regions with significant populations
- Majority in New York, Pennsylvania, Georgia and Florida; Smaller populations in other parts of the country, including Massachusetts, Delaware, Maryland, Virginia, District of Columbia, North Carolina and Texas

Languages
- English (American English, Saint Lucian English), Saint Lucian Creole French

Religion
- Christianity

Saint Lucian Americans are Americans of full or partial Saint Lucian ancestry.

The counties with largest Saint Lucian immigrants are Kings County, New York (Brooklyn), Bronx County, New York and Broward County, Florida.

== History ==
Before 1965, Saint Lucians preferred the United Kingdom as a migratory destination. Saint Lucians then have shown a marked preference to immigrate to the United States as a migratory destination after 1965. Between 1965 and 2000, more than 70% of emigrating Saint Lucians went to the United States. More than 15,000 Saint Lucians had migrated and permanently resided in the United States by the late 1990s. Many of Saint Lucian immigrants settled in New York metropolitan area.

== Notable people ==
- Nicole Fiscella
- Hulan Jack
- James Spooner
- Joey Badass
- Terance Mann
- Chirlane McCray
- Monet X Change

== See also ==
- Saint Lucia–United States relations
