= Senate of Saint Lucia =

Upper house of the Parliament of Saint Lucia

Senate
- 12th Saint Lucian Parliament

Type
- Type: Upper house of the Parliament of Saint Lucia

History
- Founded: February 22, 1979

Leadership
- President: Alvina Reynolds, SLP since 24 November 2022

Structure
- Seats: 11
- Political groups: Saint Lucia Labour Party (6); United Workers Party (3); Independent (2)

Elections
- Voting system: Appointment by the Governor-General

Website
- parliament.govt.lc

The Senate of Saint Lucia is the upper house of the Parliament of Saint Lucia. It has 11 appointed members. All members are appointed by the Governor-General, of which 6 are appointed on the Prime Minister's advice, 3 on the advice of the leader of the opposition, and 2 independent members which the Governor-General appoints using their own judgment.

== History ==
The Senate was established when Saint Lucia became independent in 1979.

== Membership ==
The Government Senators are:

- Pauline Antoine-Prospere
- Guibion Ferdinand
- Allison Jean
- Lisa Jawahir
- Kaygianna Toussaint-Charley

The Opposition Senators are:

- Dominic Fedee
- Herod Stanislaus
- Angelina Phera Polius

Independent Senators are:

- Noorani Azeez
- Deale A. L. Lee

The president is Alvina Reynolds, appointed 24 November 2022.

== See also ==
- List of presidents of the Senate of Saint Lucia
