= American Italian =

American Italian may refer to:

- Americans in Italy, a result of emigration from the United States
- Italian language in the United States
- Italian-American cuisine, a style of Italian cuisine adapted throughout the United States

== See also ==
- Italian Americans
