= Emigration from the United States =

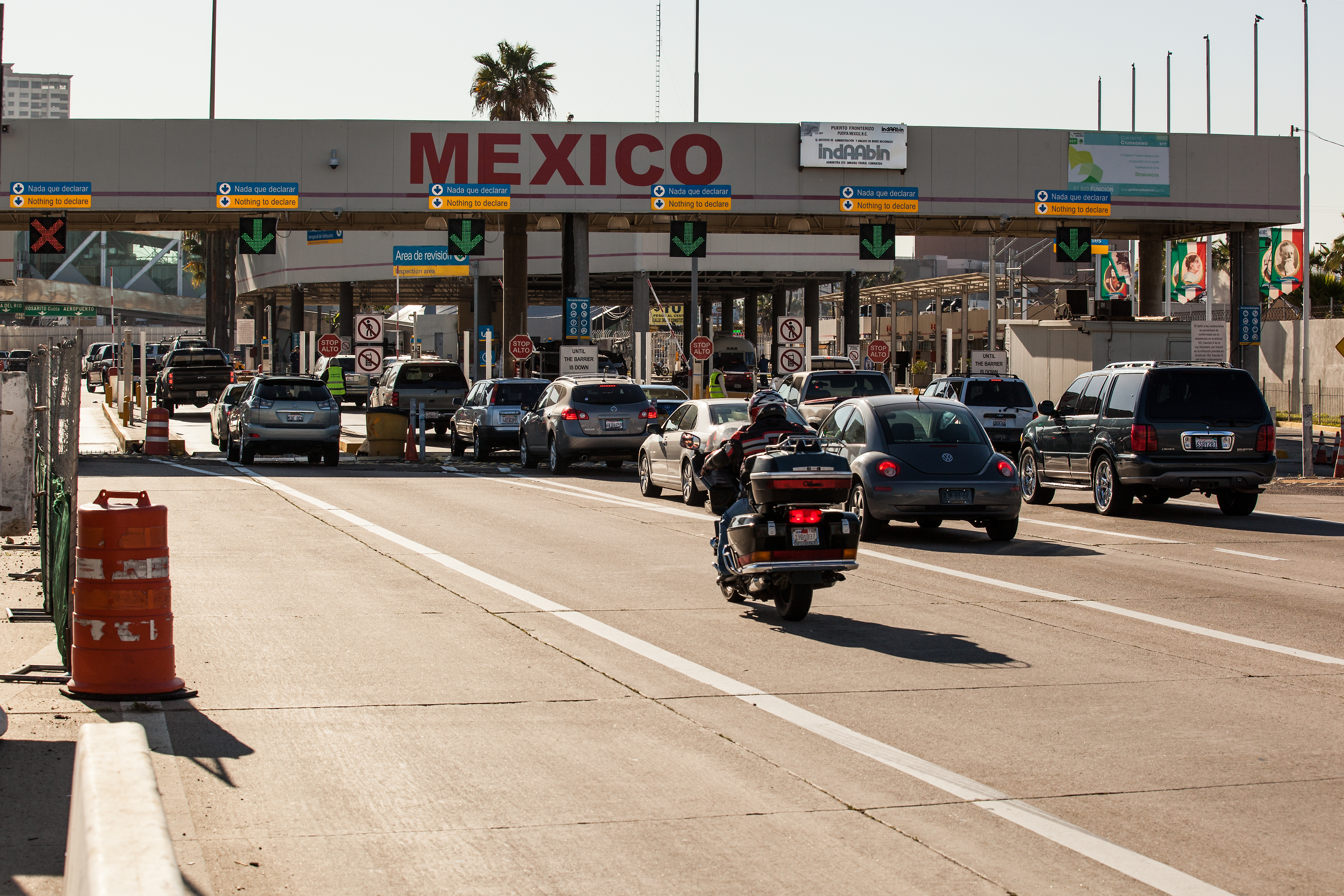
San Ysidro border crossing with several vehicles with California license plates heading to Mexico in the morning (2012)

Emigration from the United States is the process where citizens and nationals from the United States move to live in countries other than the US, creating an American Diaspora (Overseas Americans). The process is the reverse of the immigration to the United States. The United States does not keep track of emigration and counts of Americans abroad are thus only available based on statistics kept by the destination countries.

== History ==
Due to the flow of people back and forth between the United Kingdom and its colonies, as well as between the colonies, there has been an American diaspora of a sort since before the United States was founded. During and immediately after the American Revolutionary War, a number of American Loyalists relocated to other countries, chiefly Canada and the United Kingdom. Residence in countries outside the British Empire was unusual, and usually limited to the wealthy, such as Benjamin Franklin, who was able to self-finance his trip to Paris as a U.S. diplomat.

=== 18th century ===
After the American Revolutionary War, some 3,000 Black Loyalists - slaves who escaped their Patriot masters and served on the Loyalist side because of the Crown's guarantee of freedom - were evacuated from New York to Nova Scotia; they were individually listed in the Book of Negroes as the British gave them certificates of freedom and arranged for their transportation. The Crown gave them land grants and supplies to help them resettle in Nova Scotia. Other Black Loyalists were evacuated to London or the Caribbean colonies.

Thousands of slaves escaped from plantations and fled to British lines, especially after British occupation of Charleston, South Carolina. When the British evacuated, they took many former slaves with them. Many ended up among London's Black Poor, with 400 resettled by the Sierra Leone Company to Freetown in Africa in 1787. Five years later, another 1,192 Black Loyalists from Nova Scotia chose to emigrate to Sierra Leone, becoming known as the Nova Scotian settlers in the new British colony of Sierra Leone. Both waves of settlers became part of the Sierra Leone Creole people and the founders of the nation of Sierra Leone.

=== 19th century ===
Thanks to the increase of whalers and clipper ships, Americans began to travel all over the world for business reasons.

The early 19th century also saw the beginning of overseas religious missionary activity, such as with Adoniram Judson in Burma.

During the War of 1812, some African American slaves joined the Corps of Colonial Marines to fight against the United States. Their reward was guaranteed emancipation (as per the Mutiny Act 1807) and new land set aside for them in southern Trinidad. They and their descendants later became known as the Merikins.

The middle of the 19th century saw the immigration of many New Englanders to Hawaii, as missionaries for the Congregational Church, and as traders and whalers. The American population eventually overthrew the government of Hawaii, leading to its annexation by the United States.

During this time the American Colonization Society established a colony in the Pepper Coast for freedmen known as Liberia. The ACS's main goals were to Christianize indigenous Africans, end the illegal slave trade, and resettle African Americans out of the United States. Their descendants became the Americo-Liberians, who dominated the country for most of its history.

During the early 19th century, particularly between 1824 and 1826, thousands of free blacks emigrated from the United States to Haiti to escape antebellum segregation and racist policy. They primarily settled in Samana Province, where their descendants still live today as the Samana Americans. They speak their own variety of English called Samana English.

During the American Civil War, President Lincoln asked Kansas Senator Samuel C. Pomeroy and Secretary of the Interior Caleb Blood Smith to develop a plan to resettle African Americans out of the United States. Pomeroy had come up with the idea of Linconia, a freedmen colony much like Liberia in modern Chiriqui Province, Panama. After nearby Central American nations expressed their opposition to the project, it was quickly scrapped. However, 453 African workers were sent to Ile-à-Vache in Haiti as part of a private colonization effort run by entrepreneur Bernard Kock. This colony was short-lived due to Kock breaking the contract. By the end of 1863, all of the colonists had returned to the United States.

After the Civil War, thousands of Southerners moved to Brazil, where slavery was still legal at the time. They founded a city called Americana and became known as Confederados. Some also migrated to Mexico, where they established the New Virginia Colony with the help of Emperor Maximilian I of Mexico. They founded their capital, Carlota, and had planned to make more settlements, but the colony was abandoned after the fall of the Second Mexican Empire, and most of the settlers returned to the U.S. There was also a sizeable presence of ex-confederates in British Honduras, now known as Belize.

In Asia, the U.S. government made efforts to secure special privileges for its citizens. This began with the Treaty of Wanghia in China in 1844. It was followed by the expedition of Commodore Perry to Japan 10 years later, and the United States–Korea Treaty of 1882. American traders began to settle in those countries.

In the 1880s and 1890s, a large number of Americans, particularly from the state of California, settled in the Witwatersrand in South Africa during the Witwatersrand Gold Rush. In 1896, the United States government formally requested that the British administration watch over the interests of American settlers in the region.

=== Early 20th century ===
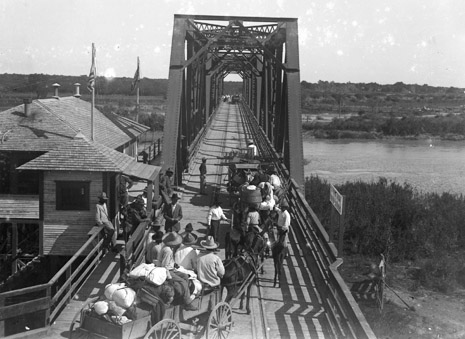
Brownsville & Matamoros International Bridge, early 1910s looking towards Mexico

Many Americans migrated to the Philippines after it became a U.S. territory following the Philippine–American War.

Cecil Rhodes created the Rhodes Scholarship in 1902 to encourage greater cooperation between the United States, the British Empire and Germany by allowing students to study abroad.

=== Interwar period ===
In the period between the First and Second World Wars, many Americans, particularly writers such as Ernest Hemingway, Gertrude Stein, and Ezra Pound, migrated to Europe to take part in the cultural scene.

European cities like Amsterdam, Berlin, Copenhagen, Paris, Prague, Rome, Stockholm, and Vienna came to host a large number of Americans. Many Americans, typically those who were idealistic and/or involved in left-leaning politics, also participated in the Spanish Civil War (mainly supporting the Republicans against the Nationalists) in Spain while they lived in Madrid and elsewhere.

Other Americans returned home to the countries of their origin, including the parents of American author/illustrator Eric Carle, who returned to Germany. Thousands of Japanese Americans were unable to return to the United States, after the Attack on Pearl Harbor.

Éamon de Valera, the third Taoiseach of Ireland during the 1930s, was born in New York to an Irish mother and a Spanish father. He moved to Ireland at a young age with his mother's family.

An estimated 100,000 Americans emigrated to the Soviet Union during the Great Depression in search of work and a 'fairer way of life'.

=== Cold War ===
During the Cold War, Americans became a permanent fixture in many countries with large populations of American soldiers, such as West Germany and South Korea.

The Cold War also saw the development of government programs to encourage young Americans to go abroad. The Fulbright Program was established in 1946 to encourage cultural exchange, and the Peace Corps was created in 1961 both to encourage cultural exchange and a civic spirit of volunteerism.

With the formation of the state of Israel, over 100,000 Jews made aliyah to the holy land, where they played a role in the creation of the state. Other Americans traveled to countries like Lebanon, again to take place in the cultural scene.

During the Vietnam War, about 100,000 American men went abroad to avoid conscription, 90% of them going to Canada. European nations, including neutral states like Denmark, Norway, Sweden, and Switzerland, offered asylum to thousands of American expatriates who refused to fight.

A small number of Americans abandoned the country for political reasons, defecting to the Soviet Union, Cuba, or other countries, such as Miguel d'Escoto Brockmann, and sixties radicals such as Joanne Chesimard, Pete O'Neal, Eldridge Cleaver, and Stokely Carmichael.

During this period Americans continued to travel abroad for religious reasons, such as Richard James, inventor of the Slinky, who went to Bolivia with the Wycliffe Bible Translators, and the Peoples Temple establishment of Jonestown in Guyana.

==== After the Cold War ====
The opening of Eastern Europe, Central Europe, and Central Asia after the Cold War provided new opportunities for American businesspeople. Additionally, with the global dominance of the United States in the world economy, the ESL industry continued to grow, especially in new and emerging markets. Many Americans also take a year abroad during college, and some return to the country after graduation.

=== 21st century ===
Iraq War deserters sought refuge mostly in Canada and Europe, and NSA whistleblower Edward Snowden escaped to Russia.

Increasing numbers of Americans retire abroad due to financial setbacks resulting from the 2008 financial crisis.

Young Americans facing a tough job market due to the recession are also increasingly open to working abroad.

According to a Gallup poll from January 2019, 16% of Americans, including 40% of women under the age of 30, would like to leave the United States. In 2018, the Federal Voting Assistance Program estimated a total number of 4.8 million American civilians lived abroad, 3.9 million civilians, plus 1.2 million service members and other government-affiliated Americans.

A survey by Arton Capital found that 53 percent of American millionaires are more likely to leave the country after the 2024 presidential election, regardless of who wins. It is also expected that more American citizens and legal immigrants will be unduly deported under the more aggressive policies of the second Trump administration.

In 2025, 40% of women and girls between the ages of 15 and 44 stated that they would permanently move abroad if given the opportunity. This desire was expressed by only 10% in 2014.

In addition to traditionally popular expatriate destinations, such as the United Arab Emirates and Qatar, Malaysia has become increasingly popular for relocation visas and in particular, American Muslims seeking a change of environment due to changing politics at home, according to some relocation service agents.

In 2025, 2.2 million people left the United States, an estimated 180,000 of those being US citizens voluntarily leaving. This was the first year of net-negative migration for the US in at least fifty years. Much of this is due to harsher immigration policy, including deportations of undocumented migrants and "all but suspend[ing]" American acceptance of refugees. Small-scale surveys suggest that voluntary emigrants most often cite political reasons as their motivation for leaving the US.

Growing voluntary emigration and involuntary deportation of skilled workers has led some writers to suggest that the US is experiencing brain drain.

== Reasons for emigrating ==
There are many reasons why Americans emigrate from the United States. Economic reasons include job or business opportunities, or a higher standard of living in another country. Others emigrate due to marriage or partnership to a foreigner, for religious or humanitarian purposes, or to seek adventure or experience a different culture. Many decide to retire abroad seeking a lower cost of living, especially more affordable health care. Immigrants to the United States may decide to rejoin family members in their countries of origin. Other reasons include political dissatisfaction, safety concerns and cultural issues such as racism. Some Americans may also emigrate to evade legal liabilities; a common past case was evasion of mandatory military service.

In addition to Americans who choose to emigrate as adults, many children are born in the United States to foreign temporary workers or international students and naturally move with their parents when they return to their countries of origin. Due to their acquisition of U.S. citizenship by birth but no significant connection to the country, they are sometimes called "accidental Americans".

== Destinations with facilitated access ==
One reason the U.S. diaspora is unusually small relative to its home population is that it is generally much more difficult for Americans to emigrate to a foreign country than, for example, citizens of countries in the Schengen Zone; similar to most other large countries, Americans looking for economic opportunity are generally limited to transmigration within the U.S.

In addition to U.S. territories, U.S. citizens have the right to reside in the Marshall Islands, Micronesia and Palau due to a Compact of Free Association between the United States and each of these countries. They may also freely move to Svalbard due to its open migration policy, as long as they are able to obtain housing and means of support there.

Americans with parents or ancestors from certain countries, such as Germany, Ireland and Italy, may be able to claim nationality via jus sanguinis and therefore move there freely. Germany and Austria also have an easier path to citizenship for descendants of victims of Nazi crimes, even if jus sanguinis does not apply in the specific case. Similarly, American Jews may move to Israel under its Law of Return.

The USMCA (and previously NAFTA) allows U.S. citizens to work in Canada and Mexico in business or in certain professions, with few restrictions. However, to obtain permanent residence they must still satisfy the regular immigration requirements in these countries.

== Net effect ==
The United States is a net immigration country, meaning more people arrive in the U.S. than leave it. There is a scarcity of official records in this domain. Given the high dynamics of the emigration-prone groups, emigration from the United States remains indiscernible from temporary country leave. There are a few countries in the Caribbean which had very high migration rates to the United States in the 1980s and 1990s but recorded higher population totals in recent years, indicating significant return migration from the U.S., such as Trinidad and Tobago between its 2000 and 2011 censuses.

== Citizenship ==
Anyone born in the United States, with the sole exception of those born to foreign diplomats, acquires U.S. citizenship at birth. Those born abroad to at least one American parent also acquire U.S. citizenship if the parent had lived in the United States for a certain number of years. Immigrants to the United States may also become U.S. citizens by naturalization.

In the past it was possible for Americans abroad to lose U.S. citizenship involuntarily, but after Supreme Court decisions such as Afroyim v. Rusk and Vance v. Terrazas, along with corresponding changes in U.S. law, they can only lose U.S. citizenship in a very limited number of ways, most commonly by expressly renouncing it at a U.S. embassy or consulate.

Historically, few Americans renounced U.S. citizenship per year, but the numbers drastically increased after 2010 when the U.S. government enacted the Foreign Account Tax Compliance Act, requiring foreign banks to report information on American holders of bank accounts located outside the United States. More than 3,000 Americans renounced U.S. citizenship in 2013, many citing the financial disclosure requirements and difficulty in finding banks willing to accept them as customers. More than 5,000 renounced in 2016, and more than 6,000 did in 2020.

== Issues ==
One of the biggest issues with the American diaspora is double taxation. Unlike almost all countries in the world, the United States taxes its citizens even if they do not live in the country. The foreign earned income exclusion mitigates double taxation on some income from work, but the Internal Revenue Code treats ordinary foreign savings plans held by residents of foreign countries as if they were offshore tax avoidance instruments and requires extensive asset reporting, resulting in significant costs for Americans at all income levels to comply with filing requirements even when they owe no tax. Even Canada's Registered Disability Savings Plan falls under such reporting requirements. The most prominent piece of legislation which has attracted the ire of Americans abroad is the Foreign Account Tax Compliance Act (FATCA). Disadvantages stemming from FATCA, such as hindering career advancement overseas, may decrease the number of Americans in the diaspora in future years. The problem is so severe that some Americans have addressed it by renouncing or relinquishing their U.S. citizenship. Since 2013, the number of people giving up US citizenship has risen to a new record each year, with an unprecedented 5,411 in 2016, up 26% from the 4,279 renunciations in 2015.

The IRS allows Americans living abroad a generous tax exemption for some income earned from foreign employment. In 2023, the first $120,000 earned was exempt from U.S. income tax, not counting potential deductions for housing expenses.

== Culture ==
=== Sports ===
Americans abroad exported baseball to many of the countries where it is popular today; the history of the sport's international spread often tied into the United States's national and civilizational objectives, though the uptake of the game was often decided by local dynamics.

Migratory ties between the United States and other countries played a significant role in basketball's international growth in the early 20th century. African American athletes who played internationally, such as the Harlem Globetrotters in basketball, played a significant role during the Cold War in assisting (and later contesting) the State Department's goal of showing the success of racial integration in the United States.

== Statistics ==
There are no exact figures on how many Americans live abroad. The United States Census Bureau does not count Americans abroad, and individual U.S. embassies offer only rough estimates.

In 1999, a Department of State estimate suggested that the number of Americans abroad may be between three million and six million. In 2016, the agency estimated 9 million U.S. citizens were living abroad, but these numbers are highly open to dispute as they often are unverified and can change rapidly.

According to the Federal Voting Assistance Program (FVAP), the Department of State's estimates are inflated on purpose as their purpose is to prepare for emergencies. FVAP makes its own detailed estimates of the number of U.S. citizens abroad, by region and by country, and of those who are of voting age, based on a variety of sources such as censuses of other countries and U.S. tax and social security records. In 2018, it estimated about 4.8 million U.S. citizens abroad, of whom about 2.9 million were of voting age. FVAP's estimates also fluctuate significantly, for example it had estimated about 5.5 million in 2016. Most recently in 2022 FVAP estimated that 4.4 million U.S. citizens lived abroad and 2.8 million of them were 18 and were eligible to vote in federal elections.

The United Nations estimates the number of migrants by origin and destination of all countries and territories. In 2019, the organization estimated that about 3.2 million people from the United States were living elsewhere. This number is mostly based on country of birth recorded in censuses, so it does not include U.S. citizens who were not born in the United States, such as those who acquired U.S. citizenship by descent or naturalization.

One indicator of the U.S. citizen population overseas is the number of Consular Reports of Birth Abroad requested by U.S. citizens from a U.S. embassy or consulate as a proof of U.S. citizenship of their children born abroad. The Bureau of Consular Affairs reported issuing 503,585 such documents over the decade 2000–2009. Based on this, and on some assumptions about the family composition and birth rates, some authors estimate the U.S. civilian population overseas as between 3.6 and 4.3 million.

Sizes of certain subsets of U.S. citizens living abroad can be estimated based on statistics published by the Internal Revenue Service (IRS). U.S. citizens with income above a certain level are required to file a U.S. income tax regardless of where they reside. During 2019, the IRS recorded about 739,000 U.S. tax returns filed with a foreign address, representing about 1.3 million people including spouses and dependents. Other indicators are the number of U.S. tax returns with a partial exclusion on income from work abroad (about 476,000 in 2016) and those reporting foreign income other than passive income (about 1.5 million in 2016), but not all of these were from people actually residing abroad full-time.

=== Estimates by country ===
Map of the American diaspora in the world (includes people with American citizenship or children of Americans). United States + 1,000,000 + 100,000 + 10,000 + 1,000

These are the numbers of American citizens living abroad in various countries:

Destination	Number	Year	Ref.
China	55,226	2020	
Italy	17,650	2025	
Sweden	9381	2025	
Japan	69,787	2025	
Russia	1588	2022	
Ukraine	5373	2020	
Czech Republic	10,475	2025	
Finland	4555	2026	
Albania	947	2023	
Belarus	124	2019	
Belgium	10,365	2024	
Cyprus	564	2021	
Germany	102,383	2022	
Hungary	3150	2025	
Luxembourg	2259	2026	
Moldova	247	2024	
South Korea	170,251	2024	
Spain	57,379	2026	
Kosovo	318	2024	
Slovenia	574	2025	
Taiwan	10,579	2026	
Iceland	1113	2026	
Romania	962	2021	
Slovakia	1379	2025	
Greece	4224	2025	
Saudi Arabia	20,500	2022	
Portugal	14,126	2023	
Lithuania	928	2026	
Estonia	855	2021	

== See also ==
- Immigration to the United States
- Lost Generation
- Taxation of non resident Americans
- American Citizens Abroad
- Taxation of United States persons
- International taxation
- Relinquishment of United States nationality
- Samaná English
- List of Americans who married foreign royalty and nobility
- African-American diaspora

=== Diaspora by host country ===
- Americans in India
- American Canadians
- American Mexicans
- Americans in Cuba
- American Brazilians
- Americans in the United Kingdom
- American Australians
- American New Zealanders
- Americans in France
- Americans in the Philippines
- Americans in Japan
- Americo-Liberian people
- Sierra Leone Creole people
- Americans living in Saudi Arabia
- American settlement in the Philippines
- Mexicans of American descent
- Confederados of Brazil
- Americans in Haiti
- Americans in Costa Rica
- Americans in Germany
- Americans in the United Arab Emirates
- Americans in Uruguay
- Americans in Ireland
- Americans in Qatar
- Americans in Taiwan
- Americans in China
- Americans in Guatemala
