= African-American diaspora =

Ethnic group descended from people of African descent enslaved in the United States

Languages
- American English

Religion
- Christianity (Protestantism)

Related ethnic groups
- American diaspora, African Americans

The African-American diaspora refers to communities of people of African descent who previously lived in the United States. These people were mainly descended from formerly enslaved African persons in the United States or its preceding European colonies in North America that had been brought to America via the Atlantic slave trade and had suffered in slavery until the American Civil War. The African-American diaspora was primarily caused by intense racism and views of being inferior to white people, driving them to find new homes free from discrimination and racism. This would become common throughout the history of the African-American presence in the United States and continues to this day.

The spreading of the African American diaspora would begin as soon as slaves were brought over to the New World and would first become a large movement during the American Revolution and into the 19th century by escaping slave owners for a chance at freedom and through serving in both the British and colonial army for their freedom. Canada would abolish slavery in 1803 and opened its doors for freemen and fugitive slaves from the states resulting in thousands migrating there to escape slavery via the Underground Railroad. Today, many African Americans, especially women, are leaving the U.S. for an easier life in places like South Africa, Mexico, and the Caribbean.

== History ==
=== 18th century ===
The spread of the African-American diaspora began during the 18th century through the escape of slaves from their masters and through the Revolutionary war. During the Revolutionary War, slaves were offered freedom in exchange for their services in both the British and Union Army. Ultimately about 5,000 would serve for the union and another 20,000 for the British during the Revolution. Newly freed African Americans who fought for either side would end up living as freedmen in Nova Scotia Canada, in England, or in British Sierra Leone.

=== 19th century ===
During the 19th century, the formation of the American Colonization Society (ACS) in 1817 would begin the Back to Africa movement with the goal of resettling free African Americans and newly emancipated slaves back to their home country. It would create the colony of Liberia and would send over 13,000 freedmen. However, the ACS was greatly disliked by both African Americans, who believed they were entitled to the same rights as any white man and America was just as much of their country as any white man.

Between 1800 and 1865 over 30,000 African Americans would escape to Canada through the Underground Railroad to escape life in the south. After the conclusion of the Civil War in 1865, the 13th Amendment was ratified by Congress abolishing slavery in all forms and freeing all persons of color from slavery. Throughout the rest of the 19th and into the 20th century, African Americans would flee the harsh realities of the South, such as lynching and other forms of racism and would mainly relocate to Canada.

=== 20th century ===
During the 20th century, African Americans continued to face racism and discrimination being denied work in higher-paying jobs and would be severely restricted through Jim Crow laws. Organized crime stopped African Americans from gaining jobs and homes and threatened the lives of those who tried to give them jobs or sell them land. During this time period, Canada would abolish its immigration policies that discriminated against African Americans and it would prompt more African-American communities to be introduced.

=== 21st century ===
In the 21st century, some African Americans have chosen to emigrate from the United States, citing experiences of systemic racism, racial violence, and economic inequality as motivating factors. Reports note that African Americans continue to experience disproportionate rates of incarceration and police violence compared to white Americans.

Destinations for recent emigrants have included countries in Africa, the Caribbean, Mexico, and parts of Europe. In interviews, some migrants describe these locations as offering a lower cost of living and a greater sense of personal security and acceptance than they experienced in the United States.

Small businesses and informal networks have also emerged to support African Americans seeking to relocate abroad. These include travel services, relocation consultancies, and community organizations that provide guidance on employment opportunities and settling in new environments. Lower costs of living in many destination countries have allowed some African Americans to migrate either permanently or on a temporary basis.

== Africa ==
=== Sierra Leone ===
Many freed slaves were discontent with where they were resettled in Canada after the Revolutionary War and were eager to return to their homeland. Beginning in 1787, the British government made its first attempt to settle people in Sierra Leone. About 300 Black Britons, known as the Black Poor of London, were settled on the Sierra Leonean peninsula in West Africa. Within two years, most members of the settlement would die from disease or conflict with the local Temne people. In 1792, a second attempt at settlement was made when 1,100 freed slaves established Freetown with support from British abolitionist Thomas Clarkson. Their numbers were further bolstered when over 500 Jamaican Maroons were transported first to Nova Scotia, and then to Sierra Leone in 1800. The descendants of the freedmen in Freetown are the Sierra Leone Creole people.

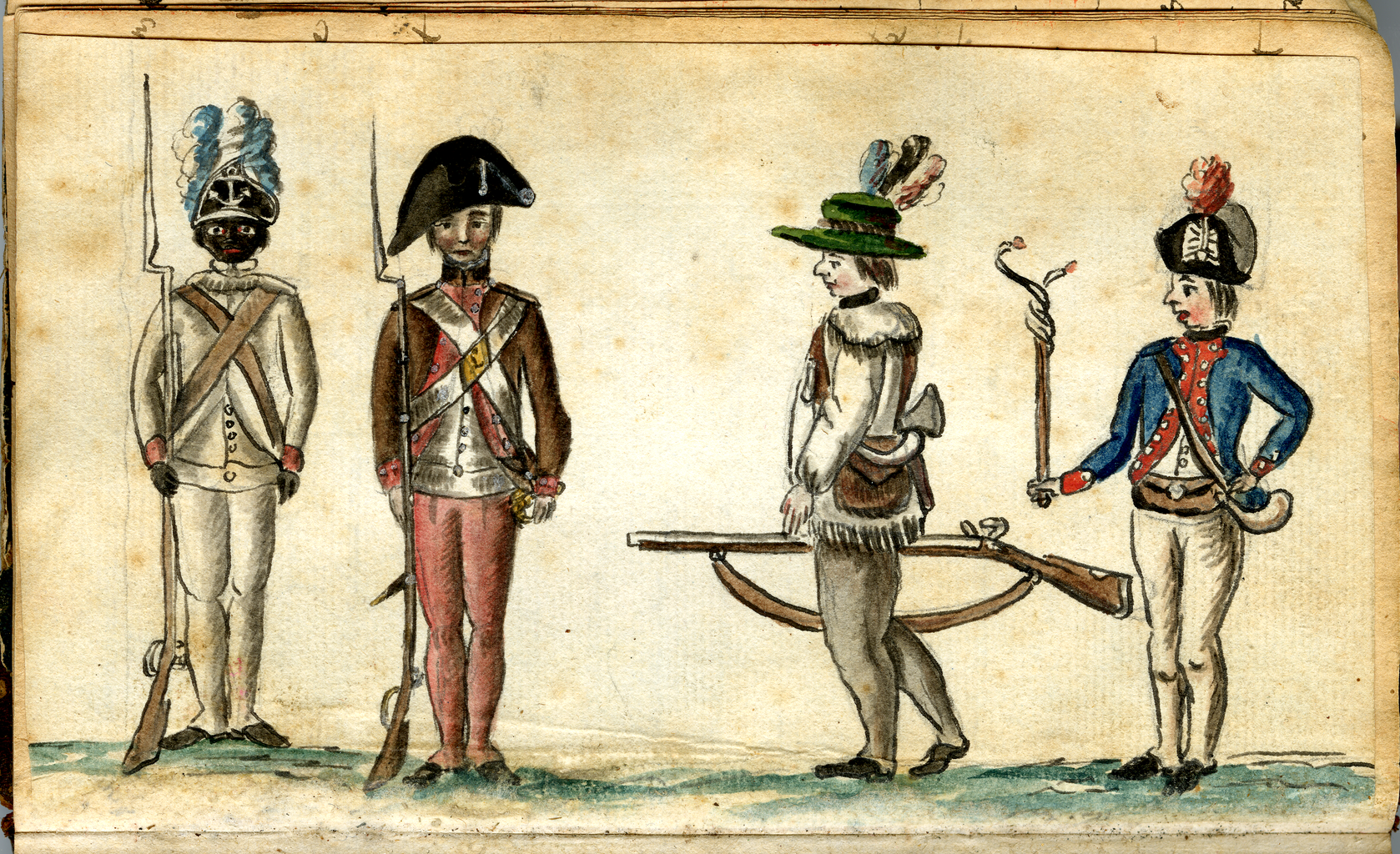
Colored soldiers served in the Revolutionary War in exchange for their freedom. Many would end up in Canada or Sierra Leone, both of which were under British control.

=== Liberia ===
In the early 19th century, the American Colonization Society was established with the stated aim of sending formerly enslaved African Americans back to Africa. There, they would establish independent colonies on the West African coast. Gaining support from both American slaveowners and abolitionists, in the 1840s ships containing both African Americans and Black West Indian settlers landed on the West African coast and established the nation of Liberia. There, they formed the Americo-Liberian ethnic group in contrast to the indigenous Africans who lived in Liberia.

=== Senegal ===
Inspired by Ghana's "Year of Return", Senegal hosted a seven-day event called "the Return", encouraging African-Americans to build business ties and invest in the country in 2022.

=== South Africa ===
Approximately 3,000 African Americans live in South Africa.

== North America ==
=== Canada ===
African Americans who settled in Canada before Confederation include three major waves:

- Black Loyalists who crossed to British lines and fought for the British during the American Revolutionary War
- Another wave of ex-slaves who joined the British to gain freedom during the War of 1812
- Tens of thousands of slaves who fled for freedom through the Underground Railroad between 1820 and 1865.

Other, smaller waves of African-American settlement occurred in Western Canada in the 19th and early 20th centuries, with African Americans from California taking up an allowance from the Colony of Vancouver Island to settle on the island in the 1860s, as well as settlements by African Americans from Oklahoma and Texas in Amber Valley, Campsie, Junkins (now Wildwood) and Keystone (now Breton) in Alberta, as well as a former community in the Rural Municipality of Eldon, north of Maidstone, Saskatchewan.

=== Mexico ===
Some African American expats have moved to Mexico to escape racism in the United States.

== Europe ==
=== United Kingdom ===
In the 1780s, with the end of the American Revolutionary War, hundreds of black loyalists, especially soldiers, from America were resettled in London. However, they were never awarded pensions, and many of them became poverty-stricken and were reduced to begging on the streets. Reports at the time stated they: ''had no prospect of subsisting in this country but by depredations on the public, or by common charity.'' A sympathetic observer wrote that ''great numbers of Blacks and People of Colour, many of them refugees from America and others who have by land or sea been in his Majesty's service were.....in great distress.'' Even towards white loyalists, there was little goodwill to new arrivals from America. Later some, many of whom had fallen into poverty, emigrated to Sierra Leone with help from Committee for the Relief of the Black Poor.

The African-American population in Britain did not grow until World War II. By the end of 1943 there were 3,312 African-American GIs based at Maghull and Huyton, near Liverpool.

=== Germany ===
There is an African American community in Germany.

=== Russia ===
African Americans emigrated to Russia in the 1930s.

=== Netherlands ===
There were African American liberators in the Netherlands.

== Asia ==
=== China ===
There is an African American presence in China. African Americans came to China during World War II. The first African American contact with China came during the Boxer Rebellion.

=== Vietnam ===
Approximately 275,000 African Americans served in the Vietnam War.

== See also ==
- Emigration from the United States
- African diaspora
- Blaxit
