= Americans in Germany =

American population in Germany

- Distribution of US American citizens in Germany (2021)

Total population
- 324,000 (with American ancestry) 111,529 (American citizens)

Regions with significant populations
- Kaiserslautern, Berlin, Darmstadt, Frankfurt, Munich, Hamburg, Mainz, Wiesbaden, Rosenheim

Languages
- American English, German and Spanish

Religion
- Christianity · Irreligion

Americans in Germany or American Germans (German: Amerikanische Deutsche or Amerika-Deutsche) refers to the American population in Germany and their German-born descendants. According to Destatis, 300,000 - 400,000 Americans live in Germany. 200,000 of them in Rhineland-Palatinate.

At the same time, more than 40,000 members of the US military and 15,000 civilian employees of American citizenship are permanently in Germany, with a strong presence in Kaiserslautern, which in the 1950s became the largest US military community outside of the United States. In addition, there are significant numbers of American expatriates in Germany, especially professionals sent abroad by their companies and an increasing number of college students and graduates (also due to the affordable higher education system and the favorable quality of life). As of December 2013, the largest American diasporas in Germany were in Rhineland-Palatinate with over 50,000 people, Berlin with over 16,000 people, and the area around Darmstadt with about 13,000 people.

== Military backgrounds ==
American Zone in Germany after 8 June 1947. Mainly today's state areas of Bavaria, Baden-Württemberg, Hesse and Rhineland-Palatinate were affected, as well as city states Berlin (West Berlin) and Bremen.

A large portion of the American-German population has a military background. Great numbers of American soldiers were stationed in Germany after World War II. The Occupation statute of 1949 set regulations for the post-war time within Allied-occupied Germany. Numerous American military installations were established during this time, and eventually hundreds were in place, mainly in Southern Germany. At the time of German Reunification in 1990, there were still about 200,000 US soldiers in Germany. By 2014, the number had been steadily reduced to 42,450 stationed in 38 facilities.

During World War II General Dwight D. Eisenhower and the American War Department enforced a strict non-fraternization policy regarding contact between American military personnel and German citizens. After the war this prohibition was mitigated in several steps and finally abandoned in Austria and Germany in September 1945. In the earliest stages of the Allied occupation US soldiers were not allowed to pay maintenance for a child they admitted having fathered, since to do so was considered as "aiding the enemy". Marriages between white American soldiers and German women were not permitted until December 1946.

== Demographics ==
Number of Americans in larger cities
#	City	People
1.	Kaiserslautern	50,000
2.	Berlin	22,694
3.	Munich	6,705
4.	Hamburg	3,880
5.	Frankfurt	3,147
6.	Bonn	1,823
7.	Düsseldorf	1,732
8.	Heidelberg	1,670
9.	Wiesbaden	1,346
10.	Nuremberg	1,327

== Organizations of Americans in Germany ==
- Democrats Abroad have an associated department in Germany.
- The Fulbright Program has a commission in Germany.

== See also ==
- Germany–United States relations
- Emigration from the United States
- German American for Americans of German descent
- Immigration to Germany
