= Americans in Taiwan =

Total population
- 11,232

Regions with significant populations
- Taipei

Languages
- English, Mandarin Chinese and Spanish

Related ethnic groups
- Americans, Taiwanese

Americans in Taiwan are the nationals and residents of Taiwan who are from the United States. As of May 2023, there were 11,232 Americans citizens living in Taiwan.

== Notable people ==
- Morris Chang, founder of TSMC
- Doris Brougham, educator and Christian missionary
- Jerry Martinson, Jesuit missionary
- TC Lin, filmmaker, photographer, and writer
- Robin Winkler, environmentalist
- Quincy Davis, basketball player
