= Americans in Guatemala =

Ethnic group in Guatemala

- (United States) (Guatemala)

Total population
- 9,000

Regions with significant populations
- Guatemala City, Antigua

Languages
- English, Spanish

Religion
- Protestantism, Roman Catholicism

Related ethnic groups
- Americans

Americans in Guatemala refers to the arrival of United States citizens who have settled in Guatemala.

== History ==
In the late part of the nineteenth century, there was a growing level of involvement from United States and Germany in Central America. During most of this century, the imports of Guatemala had been dominated by England, followed by France, Germany and the United States. However, in 1879, the United States surpassed France and Germany and in 1889, England.

The United Fruit Company sought the help of President Eisenhower, arguing that Jacobo Arbenz had legalized the Guatemalan Labor Party. In 1952 he was presented as a dangerous communist. In response, the CIA organized "Operation PBSuccess" which consisted in training and funding of a paramilitary rebel army (Liberation Movement). This movement gave the coup of 1954 by overthrowing Arbenz. Today there are companies operating in Guatemala as Compassion Guatemala, OLX, Aventours Travel Agency - Visit The Heart of the Mayan World, etc.

== American influence in Guatemala ==
There is much American influence in Guatemala, from the language, religion, traditions and economic influence.

=== English ===
Guatemala is the fourth Latin American country where English is spoken. While in Guatemala only 5% of the population speaks that language, the Swedish company Education First, places the country in 4th place in Latin America in the knowledge of this language. The study establishes the English Proficiency Index (EPI), and places Guatemalans ranked 27th with a score of 47.80 (Lower Level), only surpassed in the region by Argentina, which was placed in 16th with 54.49; Mexico 51.48 (Intermediate) and Costa Rica 49.15 (Low Level).

=== Protestantism ===
In 1882, under the presidency of General Justo Rufino Barrios, Frederick Crowe became the first Protestant missionary in Guatemala and officially received the Presbyterian pastor John C. Hill. In 1887 he replaced the Presbyterian minister Eduardo M, Haymaker, who worked in Guatemala over 60 years. By 1900 he entered the Central Guatemala Mission, the Friends (Quakers), the Primitive Methodist Church and the Church of the Nazarene.

=== Halloween ===
The Halloween celebration was propagated in Guatemala in the 1920s, when U.S. troops deployed a military base in the current Campo Marte. During the 1940s, it spread to young people who had more freedom of expression during the government of President Juan José Arévalo.

=== Mormons in Guatemala ===
There are also communities of American Mormon missionaries, who are mainly from Utah and Idaho, there is a Mormon Temple in the City of Guatemala and Quetzaltenango.

== See also ==
- Guatemalan Americans
- Guatemalan Immigration to the United States
- Guatemala–United States relations
