= American New Zealanders =

Total population
- 31,779 (by birth, 2023 census)

Regions with significant populations
- American-born people by region)
- Auckland: 9,903
- Wellington: 4,926
- Canterbury: 4,191
- Otago: 2,574
- Waikato: 2,226
- Bay of Plenty: 1,848

Languages
- New Zealand English • American English

Related ethnic groups
- American diaspora, New Zealand American

American New Zealanders are New Zealand citizens who are of American descent from American-born citizens from the United States. American New Zealanders constitute a small minority of New Zealand's population.

== Demography ==
In the 2013 census in New Zealand, when asked to indicate their ethnic identity, 12,342 New Zealanders described themselves as "American" and 21,462 stated they were born in the United States. This marked a sizeable increase, in proportional terms, from the 8,451 US-born New Zealanders in 1991. In 2013, there were also 636 persons born in American Samoa and living in New Zealand, and small numbers of persons born in other US territories.

Since the 2013 census, the number United States born people in New Zealand has steadily increased, with 31,779 people stating that they were born in the United States in the 2023 census; an increase of 10,317 from the 2013 census. This growth rate, as an annual percentage average between 2013 and 2023 (4.0%), far exceeded the average annual total population growth rate recorded over the same 10 year period (1.6%).

=== American ethnicity ===
There were 16,245 people identifying as being part of the American ethnic group at the 2018 New Zealand census, making up 0.35% of New Zealand's population. This is an increase of 3,903 people (31.6%) since the 2013 census, and an increase of 5,439 people (50.3%) since the 2006 census. Some of the increase between the 2013 and 2018 census was due to Statistics New Zealand adding ethnicity data from other sources (previous censuses, administrative data, and imputation) to the 2018 census data to reduce the number of non-responses.

There were 7,269 males and 8,979 females, giving a sex ratio of 0.810 males per female. Of the population, 3,153 people (19.4%) were aged under 15 years, 3,579 (22.0%) were 15 to 29, 8,049 (49.5%) were 30 to 64, and 1,467 (9.0%) were 65 or older.

In terms of population distribution, 73.7% of American New Zealanders live in the North Island and 26.3% live in the South Island. Waiheke Island has the highest concentration of American people at 1.1%, followed by the Queenstown-Lakes District (1.0%), Wellington City and the Waitematā local board area of Auckland (both 0.9%). The Chatham Islands was the only area to record zero American people.

=== United States birthplace ===
There were 27,678 people in New Zealand born in the United States at the 2018 New Zealand census; an increase of 6,213 people (28.9%) since the 2013 census, and an increase of 9,930 people (55.9%) since the 2006 census. In the 2023 New Zealand census, 31,779 people stated that they were born in the United States; an increase of 4,101 people (14.8%) since the 2018 New Zealand census.

In the 2018 New Zealand Census, there were 12,849 males and 14,832 females, giving a sex ratio of 0.866 males per female. Of the population, 3,537 people (12.8%) were aged under 15 years, 6,633 (24.0%) were 15 to 29, 14,016 (50.6%) were 30 to 64, and 3,495 (12.6%) were 65 or older.

== Community history ==
Americans began visiting New Zealand at the very end of the 18th century. These settled the nation as discharged British soldiers and sailors, as convicts (who were arrested at sea for maritime offenses, tried, and transported), and as whalers, sealers, or travelers. Many of these who were brought to New Zealand had a temporary stay and were returned and/or brought to New South Wales in neighboring Australia. In 1839, there were about 50 Americans living in New Zealand, constituting about 4% of the non-Māori population of the country's North Island. That number increased to 306 in 1858, 720 in 1861, and 1,213 in 1871, an increase due primarily to a gold rush in Otago. Subsequently, there were only 881 Americans living in New Zealand in 1901, their numbers then increased to 1,713 in 1951, 8,383 in 1976, and 13,347 in 2001.

Between 1942 and 1944, during the Second World War, about 100,000 US troops were stationed in New Zealand. They exercised a notable influence on the country's way of life, and a small number settled in New Zealand. Immigration rates from the United States remained low until the 1960s, however. A "surge" of US immigrants was noted in the 1960s, 1970s, and again from the mid-1990s. Some of these came as New Zealand recruited foreign teachers to meet with local shortages.

One example in recent history of American New Zealanders forming community is around the Olympic games. The New Zealand Atlanta Association formed out of the 1996 Olympic games and held New Zealand/US bicultural events including celebrating Anzac Day and Waitangi day for years after the games. The group maintains an active social media presence.

== Notable people ==
Name	Born – died	Notable for	Connection with New Zealand	Connection with United States
Augie Auer	1940–2007	atmospheric scientist and meteorologist	moved to New Zealand in 1990; naturalised New Zealander in 1996	born in St. Louis, Missouri
Tab Baldwin	1958–	basketball player and coach	moved to New Zealand in 1988; naturalised New Zealander c. 1994; coached the men's national team; honorary Officer of the New Zealand Order of Merit in 2003	born in Jacksonville, Florida
Wyatt Creech	1946–	former Deputy Prime Minister of New Zealand	New Zealand-born mother; moved to New Zealand when 1 year old; raised in New Zealand; Companion of the New Zealand Order of Merit	born in Oceanside, California
Denis Dutton	1944–2010	philosopher, academic and internet entrepreneur; Founder of Arts & Letters Daily	moved to New Zealand in 1984; naturalised New Zealander in 1991	born in Los Angeles, California
Julie Anne Genter	1979–	politician and transport planner	moved to New Zealand in 2006; naturalised New Zealander in 2011	born in Rochester, Minnesota
Roger Curtis Green	1932–2009	archaeologist, Professor Emeritus at the University of Auckland	moved to New Zealand in 1961; naturalised New Zealander c. 1966; honorary Officer of the New Zealand Order of Merit	born in Ridgewood, New Jersey
Jim Flynn	1934–2020	Emeritus Professor of Political Studies at the University of Otago; Discoverer of the Flynn effect	moved to New Zealand in 1963; naturalised New Zealander c. 1970; honorary Royal Society of New Zealand	born in Chicago, Illinois
Kenny McFadden	1960-2022	Basketball player and coach	moved to New Zealand in 1982	born in East Lansing, Michigan
Mike McMillen	1964–	speed skater	as a New Zealand citizen competed in the 1992 Winter Olympics and 1994 Winter Olympics	born in Las Vegas, Nevada
Stefania Owen	1997–	actress (Running Wilde, The Carrie Diaries)	New Zealand-born father; moved to New Zealand at age 4	born in Miami, Florida
Mark Peck	1953–	Politician; Member of Parliament for Invercargill 1993–2005	raised in New Zealand	born in Hamilton, Ohio
Jessica Lee Rose	1987–	actress	moved to New Zealand when 8 years old; raised in New Zealand	Born in Salisbury, Maryland
Tyson Ritter	1984-	singer and bassist for American rock band The All-American Rejects	moved to New Zealand	Born in Stillwater, Oklahoma

== See also ==
- New Zealand–United States relations
- African New Zealanders
- American Australians
- European New Zealanders
- Europeans in Oceania
- Immigration to New Zealand
- New Zealand Americans
