= Human capital flight from the United States of America =

Emigration of educated and skilled people from the United States

Human capital flight from the United States refers to the emigration of highly educated and skilled people, including researchers, academics and health professionals, from the United States. Journalists and researchers have reported increased interest in leaving the country, particularly among scientists and academics, since the start of the second Trump administration in 2025. Some commentators, such as Michael S. Malone, have argued that the trend began before 2016.

== Government science policy ==
Organizations including the Union of Concerned Scientists and Columbia University's Sabin Center for Climate Change Law have documented actions by the second Trump administration that they say have affected scientific research, public health and environmental policy. The Department of Government Efficiency (DOGE), led by Elon Musk, reduced the size of the federal workforce, closed or downsized several agencies, and cut funding for various research programs.

Commentators have also pointed to scrutiny of public health experts as a factor affecting their willingness to work in the United States. One opinion column cited the investigation of Anthony Fauci during his later career as an example.

== Internal migration ==
Because of the size of the United States, some researchers have examined the movement of highly educated people between states, including departures from rural areas and from some "red" states. The Movement Advancement Project found that 43% of transgender people had considered moving state since the second election of Donald Trump and 9% had already done so.

== Recruitment by other countries ==
In September 2026, Canada announced that it had recruited 64 professors through a new research fund, 48 of whom (three-quarters) came from American institutions.

== In popular culture ==
The topic has been the subject of several political cartoons.

== See also ==
- Persecution of transgender people under the second Trump administration
- Education policy of the second Trump administration, Academics leaving the US in response
- Science policy of the second Trump administration, Reactions and consequences
- Emigration from the United States
