= American School of Bombay =

Location
- Mumbai, Maharashtra; India; 19.067777°N 72.870692°E

Information
- Type: Private
- Motto: Dream, Learn, Serve
- Established: 1981
- Grades: Early Childhood-12
- Campus: Suburban
- Colors: Green and white
- Website: www.asbindia.org

The American School of Bombay is a coeducational, independent day school in Mumbai, India that serves children from Pre-K through Grade 12.

== History ==
In 1981, a group of international parents, started the American School of Bombay with 12 students in a room at the American Consulate. In November 1998, the school moved to its current campus in Bandra (a Mumbai suburb).

In 1998 it began implementing the International Baccalaureate courses.

In the school year 1997-1998 ASB sought a tax exemption. In July 2005 a flood destroyed multiple school records, which later complicated its requests to uphold its tax-exempt status. By 2018 the I-T Appellate Tribunal (ITAT) of Mumbai ruled that ASB should remain tax-exempt.

In 2020, during the COVID-19 pandemic in India, the Central Board of Secondary Education (CBSE) asked the ASB to provide its online learning content to other schools in India. The ASB agreed, allowing the CBSE to begin distributing the ASB's content.

== Curriculum ==
The American School of Bombay follows a college preparatory program that culminates with an American high school diploma (ASB Diploma) or the International Baccalaureate diploma (IB Diploma). ASB was authorized in 1998 as an IB World School implementing an international curriculum. It is also accredited by the Commission on International and Trans-Regional Accreditation in the US.

== Campus ==
The school includes a "Sensory Learning Hub" in the elementary section, where students who have had a large amount of stimulus may take periods to calm themselves.

== Special programs ==
In September 2015 a mother of an ASB student created the Writer's Club as a social club for ASB parents, with seven members at the time. By 2017 there were 35 members.

== Educational technology ==
In the middle and high school all students in grades 6-12 use laptops as a tool to support and enhance their learning throughout the curriculum. The facilities include a campus-wide wireless network. The one-to-one program in the Elementary School provides access in a 1-to-1 laptop ratio for grades 1-3 and an appropriate student-to-laptop ratio for PreK to KG. The school implements a BYOD (Bring Your Own Device) program letting students bring their own devices to school.

== Accreditation ==
- Switzerland: International Baccalaureate Organization (IBO), Primary Years Program and Diploma Program;
- USA: Middle States Association of Colleges and Schools (MSA), Commission on International and Trans-Regional Accreditation (CITA)

== Notable alumni ==
- Shraddha Kapoor, actor
- Jim Sarbh, actor
- Athiya Shetty, actor
- Tiger Shroff, actor and martial artist
- Ananya Birla, singer and entrepreneur

== See also ==
- Americans in India
