= Americans in India =

Ethnic group in India

Total population
- 1,500,000 (2024–25)

Regions with significant populations
- Bangalore · Chennai · Hyderabad · Mumbai · New Delhi · Kochi

Languages
- English (American and Indian) · Indian languages and Spanish

Religion
- Christianity · Hinduism · Islam · Sikhism

Related ethnic groups
- American diaspora

Americans in India comprise immigrants from the United States living in India, along with Indian citizens of American descent. They have a history stretching back to the late 18th century.

== History ==
During World War II, more than 400,000 American soldiers were sent to India.

After the end of British colonial rule in India in 1947, the "colonial third culture" surrounding employment, which featured expatriates in superior roles, natives in subordinate roles, and little informal socialisation between the two, began to be replaced with a "co-ordinate third culture", based around the common social life of Americans working in multinational corporations and their Indian colleagues. Americans who came to India for work slowly assimilated into this culture. Many companies in those days found they had difficulty retaining American employees with children; they found educational facilities at the high school level to be inadequate.

In a break from the long tradition of older American expatriates coming to India to manage local subsidiaries of American companies, a trend began in the 2000s of younger Americans taking jobs at Indian companies, especially in the information technology sector, often at lower wages than they had previously earned in the U.S. In 2006 there were estimated to be roughly 800 American immigrants working in high-tech companies in India.

== Numbers ==
In 2002, one widely cited estimate stated that 60,000 Americans, including African Americans, lived in India. However, exact numbers were difficult to come by because many did not register with the embassy. Some media reports around the time of the 2008 U.S. presidential election stated that 10,000 Americans lived in India at the time. However, this conflicted with another figure given by the head of the U.S. consulate in Mumbai, who estimated that there were 9,000 living in Mumbai and its surroundings alone, representing almost 0.1% of its total population.

== Culture ==
=== Music ===
American music first came to India at the turn of the 20th century, mediated to some extent through Britain and involving a significant amount of African American jazz music.

=== Sports ===
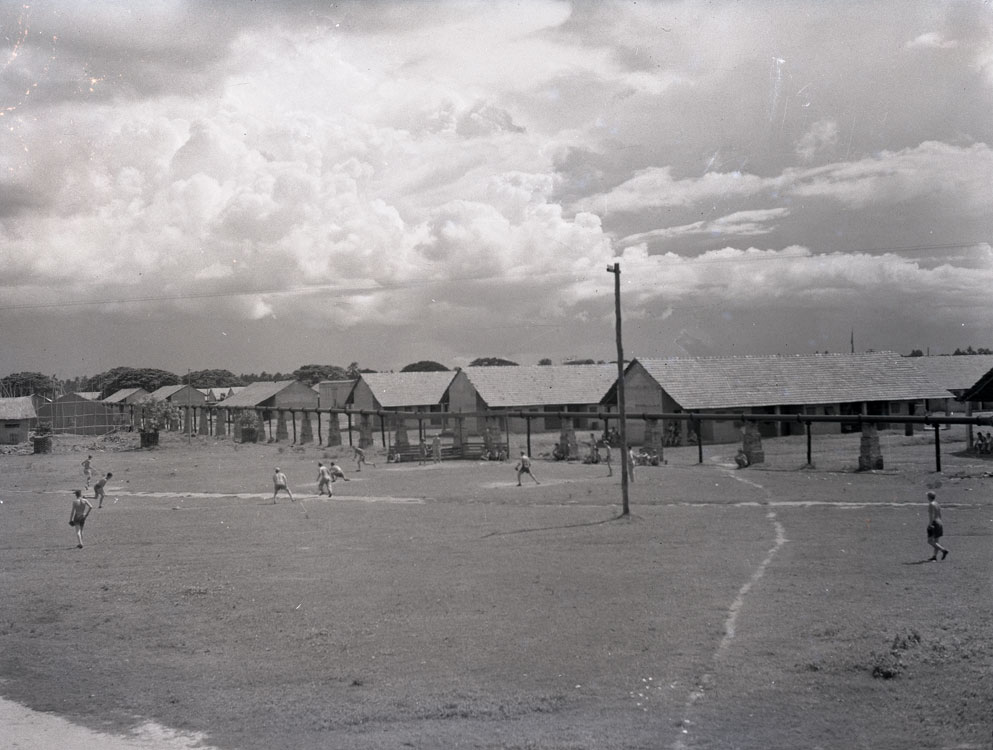
American troops playing baseball in Calcutta barracks during World War II

The YMCA played a role in bringing Western physical culture and ideas around Muscular Christianity, while also shaping the development of modern yoga. Harry Crowe Buck was one of the major proponents at the time.

== In fiction ==
Outsourced aired on NBC during the 2010 television season, depicting an American manager at a call center in Mumbai.

== Education ==
American schools in India include:

- American Embassy School (Delhi)
- American School of Bombay
- American International School Chennai

== Notable people ==
This is a list of current and former U.S. citizens whose notability is related to their residence in India.

- Akhil Akkineni, American actor of Indian descent, who works in Telugu films
- Tom Alter, actor in the Indian cinema industry, former U.S. citizen
- Martha Chen, American citizen and raised in India
- Mary Curzon, Baroness Curzon of Kedleston, CI (27 May 1870 – 18 July 1906); as Vicereine of India, she held the highest official title in history of any American woman up to her time
- Monica Dogra, American singer and actor of Indian origin based in Mumbai
- Ellis R. Dungan, American director who worked in Tamil films
- Goa Gil, American-born musician, DJ, remixer and party organizer
- Lauren Gottlieb, actress and dancer
- Nathaniel Higginson, Governor of Madras (1692–98)
- Deva Katta, an Indian-born film director who later acquired U.S. citizenship, works in Telugu films
- Imran Khan, American actor of Indian origin, who works in Hindi films
- Akshay Oberoi, an American actor of Indian origin, who works in Hindi films
- Jiah Khan, British-American actress and singer
- Dr. Anna Sarah Kugler, first medical missionary of the Evangelical Lutheran General Synod of the United States of North America
- Pooja Kumar, American actress born to Indian immigrants; works in the Tamil industry
- Justin McCarthy, American-born Indian Bharatnatyam dancer, instructor and choreographer
- Dr. Ida S. Scudder, doctor and founder of Christian Medical College, Vellore
- Nandini Nimbkar, president of the Nimbkar Agricultural Research Institute (NARI)
- Alexx O'Nell, actor and singer
- Joseph Allen Stein, American architect
- Samuel Evans Stokes, later Satyananda Stokes, came to India in 1904 to work at a leper colony in the Simla Hills, politician, freedom fighter in India's Independence Movement
- Romulus Whitaker, herpetologist and wildlife conservationist, born in New York City, became an Indian citizen in 1975
- Elihu Yale, Governor of Madras Presidency (1684–85, 1687–92), founder of Yale University
- Gadwal Vijayalakshmi, Mayor of Greater Hyderabad Municipal Corporation (GHMC) since 2021. Indian-born former American citizen.
- Amit Jogi. Chhattisgarh MLA (2013–2018) from Marwahi, former American citizen.
- John Packard (Grandfather of Actor Gavin Packard who came to India as a US Army veteran and stayed there.)
- Drew Hicks, A social media personality and YouTuber who got famous for speaking Bhojpuri and Hindi videos

== See also ==
- Indian Americans
- India–United States relations
