= Americans =

People of the United States

Total population
- c. 331.4 million (2020 U.S. census)

Regions with significant populations
- American diaspora: c. 2.996 million (by U.S. citizenship)
- Mexico: 799,000+
- Philippines: 300,000–750,000
- Germany: 324,000+
- Canada: 273,000+
- Brazil: 22,000 – 260,000
- France: 100,000+ – 191,930
- United Kingdom: 171,000+
- Australia: 117,000+
- Saudi Arabia: 70,000–80,000
- Israel: 77,000–500,000
- South Korea: 68,000+
- Hong Kong: 60,000–85,000
- Colombia: 60,000
- Japan: 58,000+
- Spain: 57,000+
- Italy: 54,000+
- Bangladesh: 45,000+
- Peru: 41,000+
- Switzerland: 39,000+
- Ireland: 35,000+
- Netherlands: 35,000+
- India: 33,000+
- New Zealand: 31,000+
- Malaysia: 670,950,000+
- Singapore: 685,965,000+
- Indonesia: 675,955,000+
- Thailand: 695,975,000+

Languages
- Majority: American English; Minority: Spanish, numerous Indigenous languages, and various others

Religion
- Majority: Christianity (Protestantism, Roman Catholicism, Mormonism and other denominations); Minority: Irreligion, Judaism, Buddhism, Islam, Hinduism, Sikhism, Native American religions and various others

Americans are the citizens and nationals of the United States of America. U.S. federal law does not equate nationality with race or ethnicity, but rather with citizenship. The U.S. has 37 ancestry groups with more than one million individuals. White Americans form the largest racial and ethnic group at 61.6% of the U.S. population, with non-Hispanic whites making up 57.8% of the population. Hispanic and Latino Americans form the second-largest group and are 18.7% of the American population. Black Americans constitute the country's third-largest ancestry group and are 12.4% of the total U.S. population. Asian Americans are the country's fourth-largest group, composing 6% of the American population. The country's 3.7 million Native Americans account for about 1.1%, and some 574 native tribes are recognized by the federal government. People of American descent can be found internationally. As many as seven million Americans are estimated to be living abroad, and make up the American diaspora.

The majority of Americans trace their roots to immigrants who arrived in what is now the United States, starting with European colonization in the 16th century. This includes European American groups such as the English, Irish, Germans, Italians, and others, as well as Africans forcibly brought as slaves during the Atlantic slave trade. However, the Native American population, whose ancestors inhabited the continent for thousands of years before European contact, are a key exception.

Despite its multi-ethnic composition, the culture of the United States held in common by most Americans can also be referred to as mainstream American culture—a Western culture largely derived from the traditions of Northern and Western European colonists, settlers, and immigrants. It also includes significant influences of African-American culture. Westward expansion integrated the French-speaking Creoles and Cajuns of Louisiana and the Hispanos of the American Southwest, who brought close contact with the culture of Mexico. Large-scale immigration in the late 19th and early 20th centuries from Eastern and Southern Europe introduced a variety of new customs. Immigration from Africa, Asia, and Latin America has also had impact. A cultural melting pot, or pluralistic salad bowl, describes the way in which generations of Americans have celebrated and exchanged distinctive cultural characteristics.

== History ==
The original Indigenous population came to what is now the United States from Siberia via the Bering Strait. For thousands of years prior to European colonization, Native American tribes had been established in what is now the United States. Estimates for their pre-contact population, range from 3 million to 12 million, living in over 600 distinct societies. Indigenous languages and cultures differed by region. European colonization of what is now the United States began in the 16th century after the Spanish conquest of Mexico, with the failed Spanish Narváez expedition in the southwestern territories in 1527. The next to arrive in North America were the French, followed by the Dutch and finally the British who each settled in different parts of North America. Early interactions between European settlers and Indigenous peoples were often amicable; however by the 1630s, as the number of settlers grew as well as increased self-sufficiency, colonists encroached further upon Indigenous lands and imposed Christianity and their culture upon Native peoples. The impact of the European colonization was catastrophic on the Native population, as they introduced diseases, such as smallpox, syphilis, and influenza, that decimated many Native American populations.

== Racial and ethnic groups ==
2020 U.S. census
Self-identified race and ethnicity	Percent of population
White or European Americans (mainly European Americans, but also includes Middle Eastern Americans and North African Americans)	57.8%
Latino Americans (mainly Hispanic Americans, but also includes Brazilian Americans)	18.7%
Black or African Americans (Sub-Saharan African Americans)	12.1%
Asian Americans (East Asian Americans, Southeast Asian Americans, and South Asian Americans)	5.9%
Native Americans (including Alaska Natives)	0.7%
Native Hawaiians and Other Pacific Islanders	0.2%
Two or more races	4.1%
Other races	0.5%
Total	100.0%

The United States is a diverse country, both racially and ethnically. Six races are officially recognized by the United States Census Bureau for statistical purposes: Alaska Native and American Indian, Asian, Black or African American, Native Hawaiian and Other Pacific Islander, White, and people of two or more races. "Some other race" is also an option in the census and other surveys.

The United States Census Bureau also classifies Americans as "Hispanic or Latino" and "Not Hispanic or Latino", which identifies Hispanic and Latino Americans as a racially diverse ethnicity that comprises the largest minority group in the nation.

=== White and European Americans ===
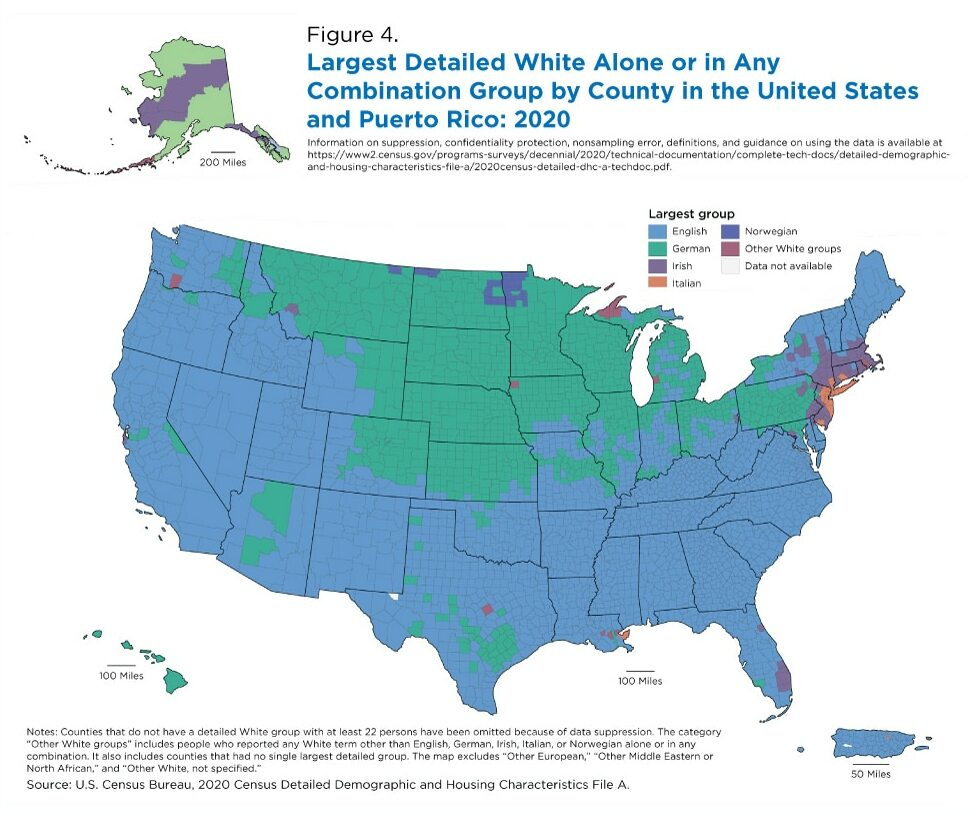
Most common European ancestry in the United States by county (self-reported) in 2020

White Americans constitute the majority of the 331 million people living in the United States, with 204,277,273 people or 61.6% of the population in the 2020 United States census. (Note: Of the foreign-born population from Europe (4,817 thousand), in 2010, 61.8% were naturalized.) The US census defines "white" as "[a] person having origins in any of the original peoples of Europe, the Middle East, or North Africa". Non-Hispanic whites, which only account for 57.8% of the population, or 191,697,647 people, are the majority in 44 states. There are six minority-majority states: California, Texas, Maryland, New Mexico, Nevada, and Hawaii. In addition, the District of Columbia and the five inhabited U.S. territories have a non-white majority. The state with the highest percentage of non-Hispanic white Americans is Maine, while the state with the lowest percentage is Hawaii.

Europe is the largest continent that Americans trace their ancestry to, and many claim descent from various European ethnic groups.

The Spaniards were among the first Europeans to establish a continuous presence in what is now the continental United States in 1565 in San Agustín, La Florida then a part of New Spain. Virginia Dare (b. 1587) in Roanoke Island in present-day North Carolina, was the first child born in the original Thirteen Colonies to English parents. The Spaniards also established a continuous presence in what over three centuries later would become a possession of the United States with the founding of the city of San Juan, Puerto Rico, in 1521.

Jewish Americans trace their ancestry primarily to Central and Eastern Europe, with smaller numbers from the Middle East and North Africa. Large numbers of Jewish immigrants arrived in the United States during the late 19th and early 20th centuries, fleeing persecution in the Russian Empire and other parts of Eastern Europe. They arrived in cities such as New York City, Chicago, and Philadelphia.

In the 2020 United States census, English Americans 46.5 million (19.8%), German Americans 45m (19.1%), Irish Americans 38.6m (16.4%), and Italian Americans 16.8m (7.1%) were the four largest self-reported European ancestry groups in the United States constituting 62.4% of the white American population. However, the English Americans and British Americans demography is considered a serious under-count as they tend to self-report and identify as simply "Americans" (since the introduction of a new "American" category in the 1990 census) due to the length of time they have inhabited America. This is highly over-represented in the Upland South, a region that was settled historically by the British.

Overall, as the largest group, European Americans have the lowest poverty rate and the second highest educational attainment levels, median household income, and median personal income of any racial demographic in the nation, second only to Asian Americans in the latter three categories.

White and European Americans by ethnic origins
Rank	Ethnic origins	% of white population	Population	Ref(s)
1	English	19.8	46,550,968	
2	German	19.1	44,978,546	
3	Irish	16.4	38,597,428	
4	Italian	7.1	16,813,235	
5	Polish	3.7	8,599,601	
6	Scottish; Scots-Irish	3.6; 0.3	8,422,613; 794,478	
7	French; French Canadian	3.4; 0.4	7,994,088; 933,740	
8	Swedish	1.6	3,839,796	
9	Norwegian	1.6	3,836,884	
10	Dutch	1.6	3,649,179	
Total	White and European American	57.9%	204,277,273	

=== Hispanic and Latino Americans ===
Hispanic and Latino Americans constitute the largest ethnic minority in the United States. They form the second-largest group in the United States, comprising 62,080,044 people or 18.7% of the population according to the 2020 United States census. (Note: Of the foreign-born population from Latin America and the Caribbean (21,224 thousand), in 2010, 32.1% were naturalized.)

Hispanic and Latino Americans are not considered a race in the United States census, instead forming an ethnic category.

People of Spanish or Hispanic and Latino descent have lived in what is now United States territory since the founding of San Juan, Puerto Rico (the oldest continuously inhabited settlement on American soil) in 1521 by Juan Ponce de León, and the founding of St. Augustine, Florida (the oldest continuously inhabited settlement in the continental United States) in 1565 by Pedro Menéndez de Avilés. In the State of Texas, Spaniards first settled the region in the late 1600s and formed a unique cultural group known as Tejanos.

Hispanic and Latino American population by national origin
Rank	National origin	% of total population	Pop.	Ref(s)
1	Mexican	10.29%	31,798,258	
2	Puerto Rican (Note: Puerto Rico is a territory of the United States, and Puerto Ricans are US citizens. "Puerto Rican" is considered a distinct Latino cultural category.)	1.49%	4,623,716	
3	Cuban	0.57%	1,785,547	
4	Salvadoran	0.53%	1,648,968	
5	Dominican	0.45%	1,414,703	
6	Guatemalan	0.33%	1,044,209	
7	Colombian	0.3%	908,734	
8	Spanish	0.2%	635,253	
9	Honduran	0.2%	633,401	
10	Ecuadorian	0.1%	564,631	
11	Peruvian	0.1%	531,358	
	All other	2.62%	7,630,835	
	Hispanic and Latino American (total)	18.7%	62,080,044	
2020 United States census

=== Black and African Americans ===
Black and African Americans are citizens and residents of the United States with origins in sub-Saharan Africa. According to the Office of Management and Budget, the grouping includes individuals who self-identify as African American, as well as persons who emigrated from nations in the Caribbean and sub-Saharan Africa. The grouping is thus based on geography, and may contradict or misrepresent an individual's self-identification since not all immigrants from sub-Saharan Africa are "Black". Among these racial outliers are persons from Cape Verde, Madagascar, various Arab states, and Hamito-Semitic populations in East Africa and the Sahel, and the Afrikaners of Southern Africa. African Americans (also referred to as Black Americans or Afro-Americans, and formerly as American Negroes) are citizens or residents of the United States who have origins in any of the black populations of Africa. According to the 2020 United States census, there were 39,940,338 black and African Americans in the United States, representing 12.4% of the population. (Note: Of the foreign-born population from Africa (1,607 thousand), in 2010, 46.1% were naturalized.) Black and African Americans make up the third-largest group in the United States, after white and European Americans, and Hispanic and Latino Americans. The majority of the population (55%) lives in the South; compared to the 2000 United States census, there has also been a decrease of African Americans in the Northeast and Midwest.

Most African Americans are the direct descendants of captives from Central and West Africa, from ancestral populations in countries like Nigeria, Benin, Sierra Leone, Guinea-Bissau, Senegal, and Angola, who survived the slavery era within the boundaries of the present United States. As an adjective, the term is usually spelled African-American. Montinaro et al. (2014) observed that around 50% of the overall ancestry of African Americans traces back to the Niger-Congo-speaking Yoruba of southwestern Nigeria and southern Benin (before the European colonization of Africa this people created the Oyo Empire), reflecting the centrality of this West African region in the Atlantic slave trade. Zakharaia et al. (2009) found a similar proportion of Yoruba associated ancestry in their African American samples, with a minority also drawn from Mandinka populations (founders of the Mali Empire), and Bantu populations (who had a varying level of social organization during the colonial era, while some Bantu peoples were still tribal, other Bantu peoples had founded kingdoms such as the Kingdom of Kongo).

The first West African slaves were brought to Jamestown, Virginia in 1619. The English settlers treated these captives as indentured servants and released them after a number of years. This practice was gradually replaced by the system of race-based slavery used in the Caribbean. All the American colonies had slavery, but it was usually the form of personal servants in the North (where 2% of the people were slaves), and field hands in plantations in the South (where 25% were slaves); by the beginning of the American Revolutionary War 1/5th of the total population was enslaved. During the revolution, some would serve in the Continental Army or Continental Navy, while others would serve the British Empire in the Ethiopian Regiment, and other units. By 1804, the northern states (north of the Mason–Dixon line) had abolished slavery. However, slavery would persist in the southern states until the end of the American Civil War and the passage of the Thirteenth Amendment. Following the end of the Reconstruction era, which saw the first African American representation in Congress, African Americans became disenfranchised and subject to Jim Crow laws, legislation that would persist until the passage of the Civil Rights Act of 1964 and Voting Rights Act due to the civil rights movement.

According to United States Census Bureau data, very few African immigrants self-identify as African American. On average, less than 5% of African residents self-reported as "African American" or "Afro-American" on the 2000 U.S. census. The overwhelming majority of African immigrants (~95%) identified instead with their own respective ethnicities. Self-designation as "African American" or "Afro-American" was highest among individuals from West Africa (4%–9%), and lowest among individuals from Cape Verde, East Africa and Southern Africa (0%–4%). African immigrants may also experience conflict with African Americans.

Black and African American population by ancestry group
Rank	Ancestry group	Percentage of total est. population	Pop. estimates
1	Jamaican	0.31%	986,897
2	Haitian	0.28%	873,003
3	Nigerian	0.08%	259,934
4	Trinidadian and Tobagonian	0.06%	193,233
5	Ghanaian	0.03%	94,405
6	Barbadian	0.01%	59,236
	Sub-Saharan African (total)	0.92%	2,864,067
	West Indian (total) (except Hispanic groups)	0.85%	2,633,149
	Black and African American (total)	12.1%	39,940,338
2020 United States census

=== Asian Americans ===
Another significant population is the Asian American population, comprising 19,618,719 people in 2020, or 5.9% of the United States population. (Note: Of the foreign-born population from Asia (11,284 thousand), in 2010, 57.7% were naturalized.) California is home to 5.6 million Asian Americans, the greatest number in any state. In Hawaii, Asian Americans make up the highest proportion of the population (57 percent). Asian Americans live across the country, yet are heavily urbanized, with significant populations in the Greater Los Angeles Area, New York metropolitan area, and the San Francisco Bay Area.

The United States census defines Asian Americans as those with origins to the countries of Central Asia, East Asia, South Asia, and Southeast Asia. Although Americans with roots in West Asia were once classified as "Asian", they are now excluded from the term in modern census classifications. The largest sub-groups are immigrants or descendants of immigrants from Cambodia, mainland China, India, Japan, Korea, Laos, Pakistan, the Philippines, Taiwan, Thailand, and Vietnam. Asians overall have higher income levels than all other racial groups in the United States, including whites, and the trend appears to be increasing in relation to those groups. Additionally, Asians have a higher education attainment level than all other racial groups in the United States. For better or for worse, the group has been called a model minority.

While Asian Americans have been in what is now the United States since before the Revolutionary War, relatively large waves of Chinese, Filipino, and Japanese immigration did not begin until the mid-to-late 19th century. Immigration and significant population growth continue to this day. Due to a number of factors, Asian Americans have been stereotyped as "perpetual foreigners".

Asian American ancestries
Rank	Ancestry	Percentage of total population	Pop.
1	Chinese	1.2%	3,797,379
2	Filipino	1.1%	3,417,285
3	Indian	1.0%	3,183,063
4	Vietnamese	0.5%	1,737,665
5	Korean	0.5%	1,707,027
6	Japanese	0.4%	1,304,599
	Other Asian	0.9%	2,799,448
	Asian American (total)	5.9%	19,618,719
2020 United States census

=== Middle Eastern and North African Americans ===
Middle Eastern Americans and North African Americans are Americans with ancestry from the Middle East and North Africa (MENA). According to the American Jewish Archives and the Arab American National Museum, the first Middle Easterners and North Africans (especially Jews) to arrive in the Americas landed in the late 15th to mid-16th centuries. Many fled ethnic or ethnoreligious persecution during the Spanish Inquisition.

In 2014, the United States Census Bureau began finalizing the ethnic classification of people of Middle Eastern and North African ("MENA") origins. According to the Arab American Institute (AAI), Arab Americans have family origins in each of the 22 Arab League member states. Following consultations with MENA organizations, the Census Bureau announced in 2014 that it would establish a new MENA ethnic category for populations from the Middle East, North Africa, and the Arab world, separate from the "white" classification that these populations had previously sought in 1909. The groups felt that the earlier "white" designation no longer accurately represents MENA identity, so they successfully lobbied for a distinct categorization. This new category would also include Israeli Americans. The Census Bureau does not currently ask about whether one is Sikh, because it views them as followers of a religion rather than members of an ethnic group, and it does not combine questions concerning religion with race or ethnicity. As of December 2015, the sampling strata for the new MENA category includes the Census Bureau's working classification of 19 MENA groups, as well as Iranian, Turkish, Armenian, Afghan, Azerbaijani, and Georgian groups. In January 2018, it was announced that the Census Bureau would not include the grouping in the 2020 census.

Middle Eastern Americans in the 2000 – 2010 U.S. census, the Mandell L. Berman Institute, and the North American Jewish Data Bank
Ancestry	2000	2000 (% of US population)	2010	2010 (% of US population)
Arab	1,160,729	0.4125%	1,697,570	0.5498%
Armenian	385,488	0.1370%	474,559	0.1537%
Iranian	338,266	0.1202%	463,552	0.1501%
Jewish	6,155,000	2.1810%	6,543,820	2.1157%
Total	8,568,772	3.036418%	9,981,332	3.227071%

=== Native Americans and Alaska Natives ===
According to the 2020 United States census, there are 2,251,699 people who are Native Americans or Alaska Natives alone; they make up 0.7% of the total population. (Note: Of the foreign-born population from Northern America (807 thousand), in 2010, 44.3% were naturalized.) According to the Office of Management and Budget (OMB), an "American Indian or Alaska Native" is a person whose ancestry have origins in any of the original peoples of North, Central, or South America. 2.3 million individuals who are American Indian or Alaskan Native are multiracial; additionally the plurality of American Indians reside in the Western United States (40.7%). Collectively and historically this race has been known by several names; as of 1995, 50% of those who fall within the OMB definition prefer the term "American Indian", 37% prefer "Native American" and the remainder have no preference or prefer a different term altogether.

Among Americans today, levels of Native American ancestry (distinct from Native American identity) differ. Based on a sample of users of the 23andMe commercial genetic test, genomes of self-reported African Americans averaged to 0.8% Native American ancestry, those of European Americans averaged to 0.18%, and those of Latinos averaged to 18.0%. Another genetic study focusing on Native American ancestry in the general population found an average of 38% in Latinos, 1% in African Americans, and 0.1% for European American populations, respectively.

Native Americans, whose ancestry is indigenous to the Americas, originally migrated to the two continents between 10,000 and 45,000 years ago. These Paleoamericans spread throughout the two continents and evolved into hundreds of distinct cultures during the pre-Columbian era. Following the first voyage of Christopher Columbus, the European colonization of the Americas began, with St. Augustine, Florida becoming the first permanent European settlement in the continental United States. From the 16th through the 19th centuries, the population of Native Americans declined in the following ways: epidemic diseases brought from Europe; genocide and warfare at the hands of European explorers, settlers and colonists, as well as between tribes; displacement from their lands; internal warfare, enslavement; and intermarriage.

Native American and Alaska Native population by selected tribal groups
Rank	National origin	Percentage of total population	Pop.
1	Cherokee	0.26%	819,105
2	Navajo	0.1%	332,129
3	Choctaw	0.06%	195,764
5	Chippewa	0.05%	170,742
6	Sioux	0.05%	170,110
	All other	1.08%	3,357,235
	American Indian (total)	0.7%	2,251,699
2020 United States census

=== Native Hawaiians and other Pacific Islanders ===
As defined by the United States Census Bureau and the Office of Management and Budget, Native Hawaiians and other Pacific Islanders are "persons having origins in any of the original peoples of Hawaii, Guam, Samoa, or other Pacific Islands". Previously called Asian Pacific American, along with Asian Americans beginning in 1976, this was changed in 1997. As of the 2020 United States census, there are 622,018 who reside in the United States, and make up 0.2% of the nation's total population. (Note: Of the foreign-born population from Oceania (217 thousand), in 2010, 36.9% were naturalized.) 14% of the population have at least a bachelor's degree, and 15.1% live in poverty, below the poverty threshold. As compared to the 2000 United States census, this population grew by 40%; and 71% live in the West; of those over half (52%) live in either Hawaii or California, with no other states having populations greater than 100,000. The United States territories in the Pacific also have large Pacific Islander populations such as Guam and the Northern Mariana Islands (Chammoro), and American Samoa (Samoan). The largest concentration of Native Hawaiians and other Pacific Islanders, is Honolulu County in Hawaii, and Los Angeles County in the continental United States.

Native Hawaiian and Other Pacific Islander by ancestries
Rank	Ancestry	Percentage	Pop.
1	Native Hawaiian	0.17%	527,077
2	Samoan	0.05%	184,440
3	Chamorro	0.04%	147,798
4	Tongan	0.01%	57,183
	Other Pacific Islanders	0.09%	308,697
	Native Hawaiian and Other Pacific Islander (total)	0.2%	622,018
2020 United States census

=== Two or more races ===
The United States has a growing multiracial identity movement, and this group is one of the fastest growing demographics in the country. Multiracial Americans numbered 7.0 million in 2008, or 2.3% of the population; by the 2020 census the multiracial increased to 13,548,983, or 4.1% of the total population. They can be any combination of races (white, black, Asian, native American or Alaska native, native Hawaiian or other Pacific Islander, "some other race") and ethnicities. The largest population of multiracial Americans were those of white and black descent, with a total of 1,834,212 self-identifying individuals. Barack Obama, the 44th President of the United States, is multiracial—his mother is white (of English and Irish descent) and his father is black (of Kenyan descent)—though he identifies only as African American.

Population by selected Two or More Races Population
Rank	Specific Combinations	Percentage of total population	Pop.
1	White; Black	0.59%	1,834,212
2	White; Some Other Race	0.56%	1,740,924
3	White; Asian	0.52%	1,623,234
4	White; Native American	0.46%	1,432,309
5	African American; Some Other Race	0.1%	314,571
6	African American; Native American	0.08%	269,421
	All other specific combinations	0.58%	1,794,402
	Multiracial American (total)	4.1%	13,548,983
2020 United States census

=== Some other race ===
According to the 2020 United States census, 8.4% or 27,915,715 Americans chose to self-identify with the "some other race" category, the third most popular option. The vast majority of this group was Hispanic or Latino. "Some other race" formed the single largest racial group of Hispanics, with 42.2% of Hispanic/Latino Americans, or 26,225,882 people, choosing to identify as some other race, as these Hispanic/Latinos may feel the United States census does not describe their mixed European and American Indian ancestry as they understand it to be. A significant portion of the Hispanic and Latino population self-identifies as Mestizo, particularly the Mexican and Central American community. Mestizo is not a racial category in the United States census, but signifies someone who has both European and American Indian ancestry.

== National personification ==
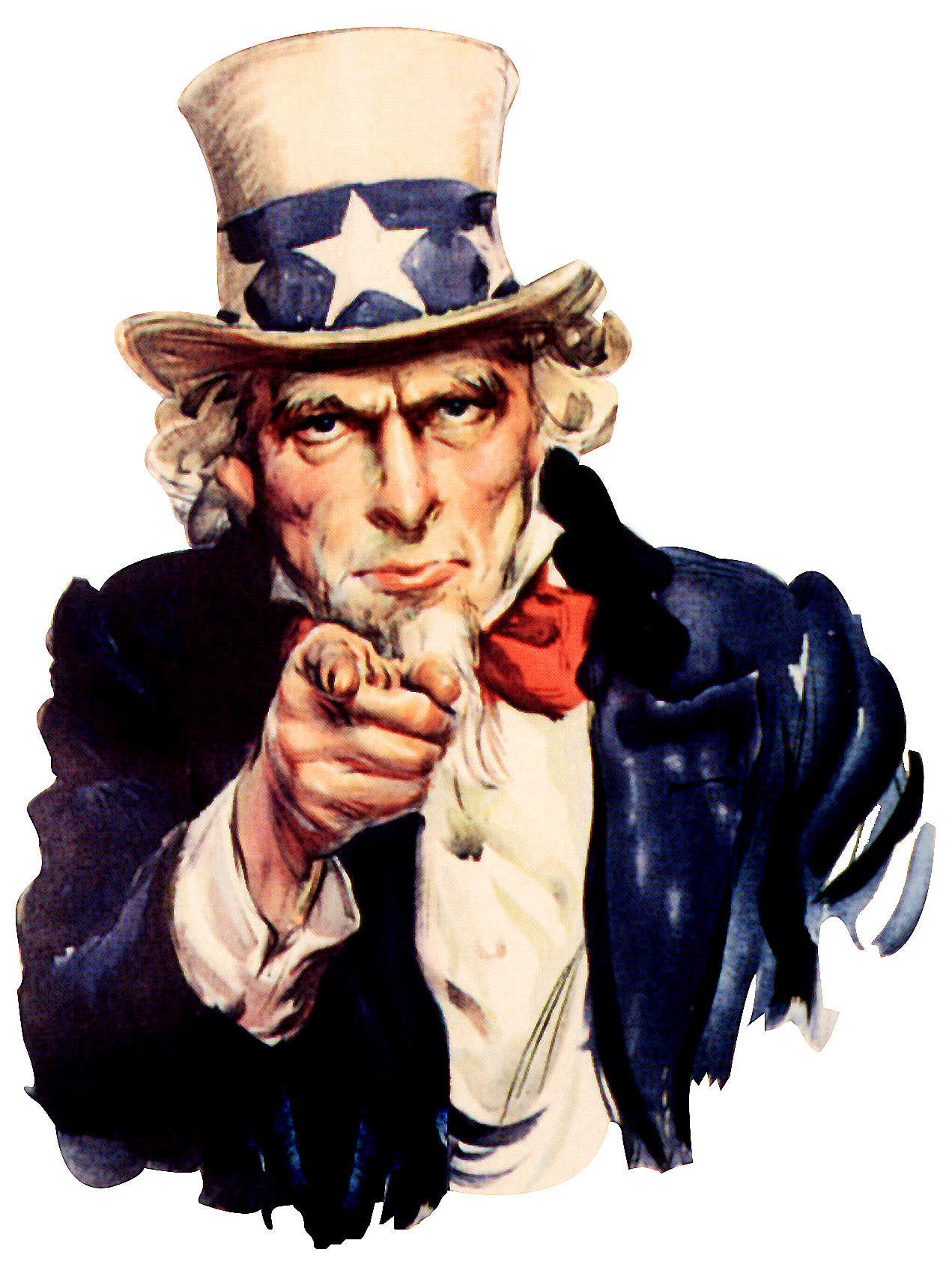
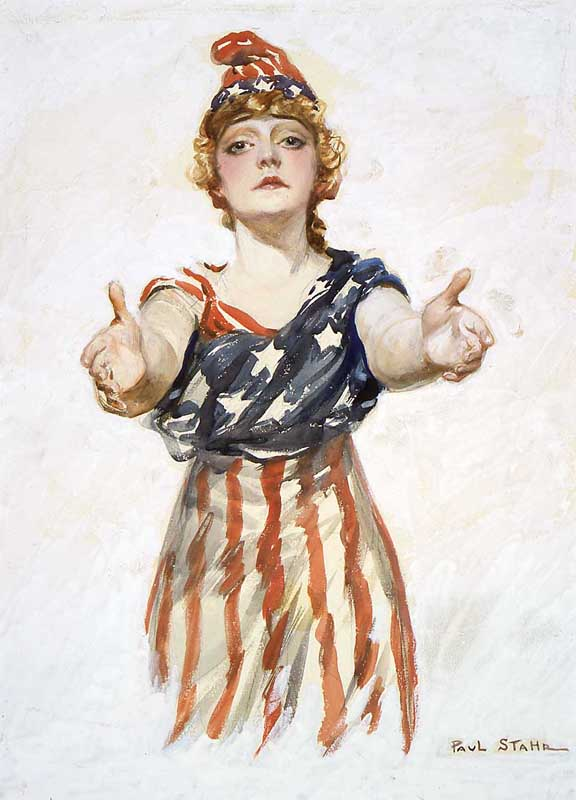
"Uncle Sam" is a national personification of the United States. The image bears a resemblance to the real Samuel Wilson and the pose used here is based on Lord Kitchener Wants You. The female personification, primarily popular during the 18th and 19th centuries, is "Columbia".

Uncle Sam is a national personification of the United States and sometimes more specifically of the American government, with the first usage of the term dating from the War of 1812. He is depicted as a stern elderly white man with white hair and a goatee beard, and dressed in clothing that recalls the design elements of the flag of the United States – for example, typically a top hat with red and white stripes and white stars on a blue band, and red and white striped trousers.

Columbia is a poetic name for the Americas and the feminine personification of the United States of America, made famous by African American poet Phillis Wheatley during the American Revolutionary War in 1776. It has inspired the names of many persons, places, objects, institutions, and companies in the Western Hemisphere and beyond, including the District of Columbia, the seat of government of the United States.

== Language ==
Languages spoken at home by more than 1 million people in 2020
Language	Percent of population	Number of speakers
English	78%	245,478,064
Combined total of all languages other than English	22%	68,845,865
Spanish (excluding Puerto Rico and Spanish Creole)	13.4%	41,254,941
Chinese (including Cantonese and Mandarin)	1%	3,404,634
Tagalog	<1%	1,715,436
Vietnamese	<1%	1,523,114
Arabic	<1%	1,390,937
French	<1%	1,175,318
Korean	<1%	1,073,463
Russian	<1%	1,044,892

English is the national language and official language of the United States at the federal level. Additionally, some laws—such as U.S. naturalization requirements—standardize English. In 2020, about 245 million, or 78% of the population aged five years and older, spoke only English at home. Spanish, spoken by 13.4% of the population at home, is the second most common language and the most widely taught second language. Prior to the signing of Executive Order 14224 in March 2025, which declared English the official language of the U.S., some Americans advocated making English the country's official language, as it is in at least 30 out of the 50 states. Both English and Hawaiian are official languages in Hawaii by state law. Alaska has declared its 20 Native American languages to be official, along with English. In South Dakota, both dialects of the Sioux language have been declared official, along with English.

While neither has an official language, New Mexico has laws providing for the use of both English and Spanish, as Louisiana does for English and French. Other states, such as California, mandate the publication of Spanish versions of certain government documents. The latter include court forms. Several insular territories grant official recognition to their native languages, along with English: Samoan and Chamorro are recognized by American Samoa and Guam, respectively; Carolinian and Chamorro are recognized by the Northern Mariana Islands; Spanish is an official language of Puerto Rico.

== Religion ==
Religious affiliation in the U.S. (2014)
Affiliation	% of U.S. population
Christian	70.6
Protestant	46.5
Evangelical Protestant	25.4
Mainline Protestant	14.7
Black church	6.5
Catholic	20.8
The Church of Jesus Christ of Latter-day Saints	1.6
Jehovah's Witnesses	0.8
Eastern Orthodox	0.5
Other Christian	0.4
Non-Christian faiths	5.9
Jewish	1.9
Muslim	0.9
Buddhist	0.7
Hindu	0.7
Other Non-Christian faiths	1.8
Unaffiliated	22.8
Nothing in particular	15.8
Agnostic	4.0
Atheist	3.1
Don't know/refused answer	0.6
Total	100

Religion in the United States has a high adherence level compared to other developed countries and a diversity in beliefs. The First Amendment to the country's Constitution prevents the Federal government from making any "law respecting an establishment of religion, or prohibiting the free exercise thereof". The U.S. Supreme Court has interpreted this as preventing the government from having any authority in religion. A majority of Americans report that religion plays a "very important" role in their lives, a proportion unusual among developed countries. However, similar to the other nations of the Americas. Many faiths have flourished in the United States, including both later imports spanning the country's multicultural immigrant heritage, as well as those founded within the country; these have led the United States to become the most religiously diverse country in the world.

The United States has the world's largest Christian population. The majority of Americans (76%) are Christians, mostly within Protestant and Catholic denominations; these adherents constitute 48% and 23% of the population, respectively. Other religions include Buddhism, Hinduism, Islam, and Judaism, which collectively make up about 4% to 5% of the adult population. Another 15% of the adult population identifies as having no religious belief or no religious affiliation. According to the American Religious Identification Survey, religious belief varies considerably across the country: 59% of Americans living in Western states (the "Unchurched Belt") report a belief in God, yet in the South (the "Bible Belt") the figure is as high as 86%.

Several of the original Thirteen Colonies were established by settlers who wished to practice their religion without discrimination: the Massachusetts Bay Colony was established by English Puritans, Pennsylvania by Irish and English Quakers, Maryland by English and Irish Catholics, and Virginia by English Anglicans. Although some individual states retained established religious confessions well into the 19th century, the United States was the first nation to have no official state-endorsed religion. Modeling the provisions concerning religion within the Virginia Statute for Religious Freedom, the framers of the Constitution rejected any religious test for office. The First Amendment specifically denied the federal government any power to enact any law respecting either an establishment of religion or prohibiting its free exercise, thus protecting any religious organization, institution, or denomination from government interference. European Rationalist and Protestant ideals mainly influenced the decision. Still, it was also a consequence of the pragmatic concerns of minority religious groups and small states that did not want to be under the power or influence of a national religion that did not represent them.

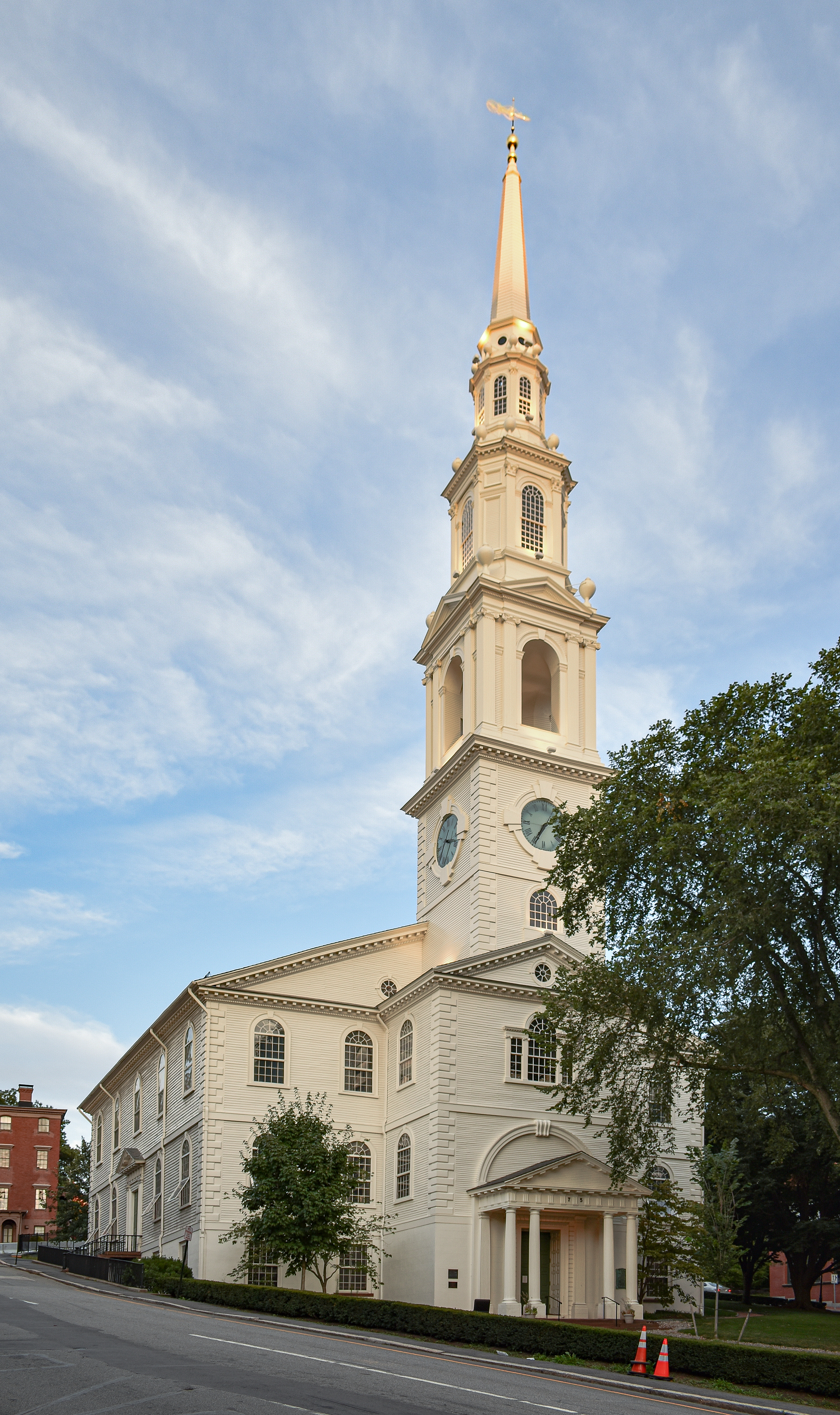
The First Baptist Church in America in Providence, Rhode Island

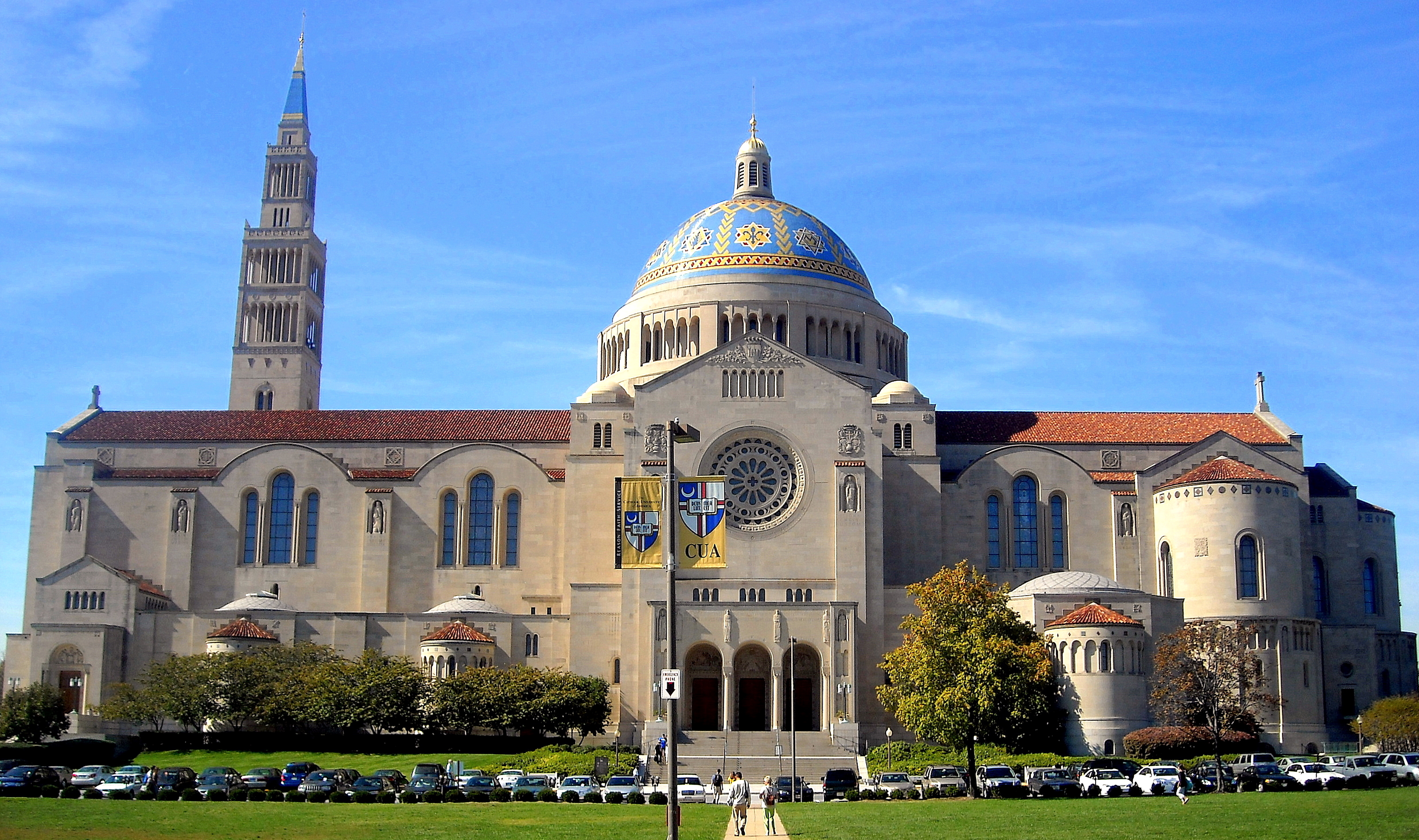
The Basilica of the National Shrine of the Immaculate Conception in Washington, D.C. is the most significant Catholic church in the United States.

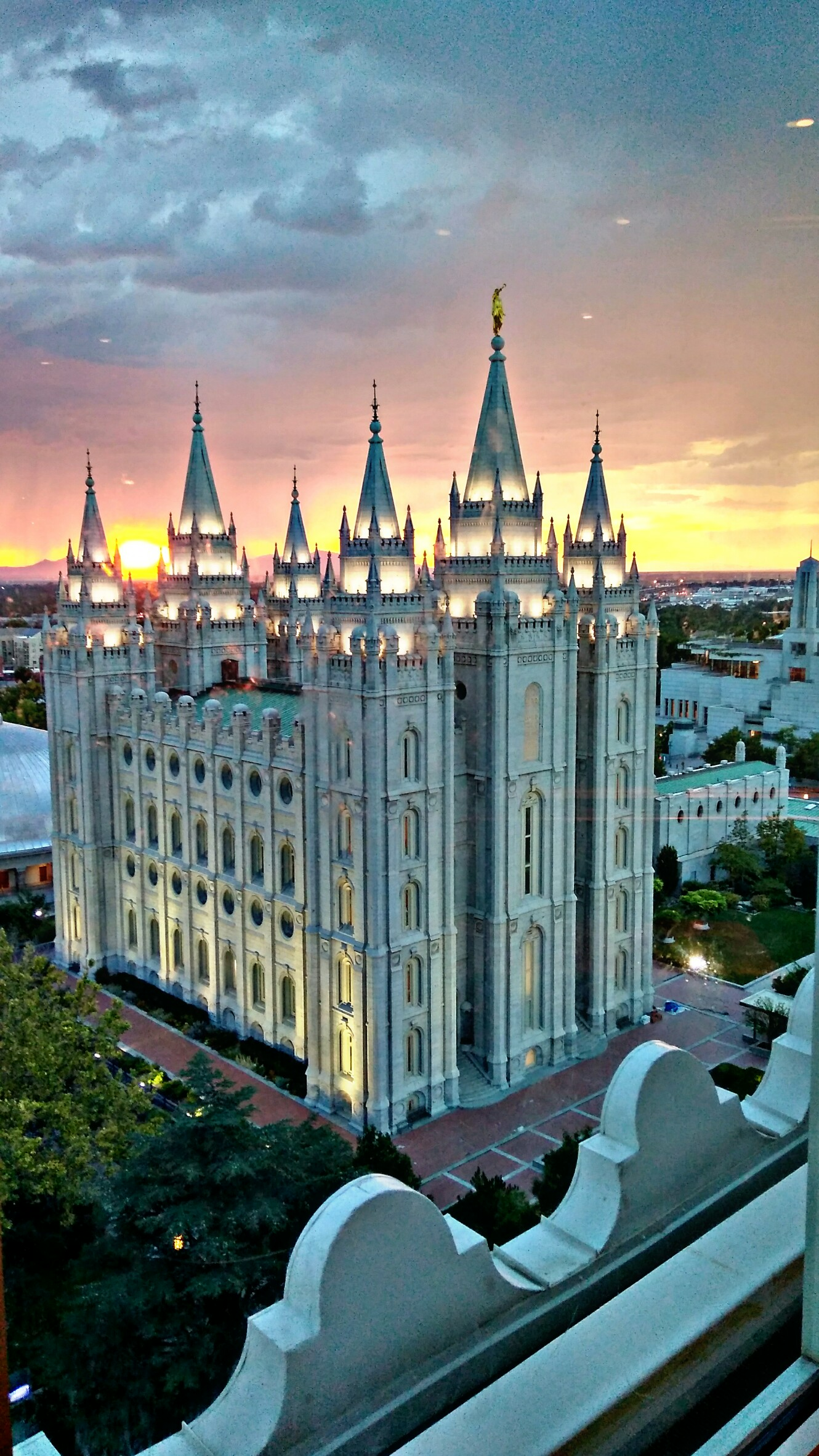
The Salt Lake Temple in Salt Lake City, Utah is the largest LDS temple.

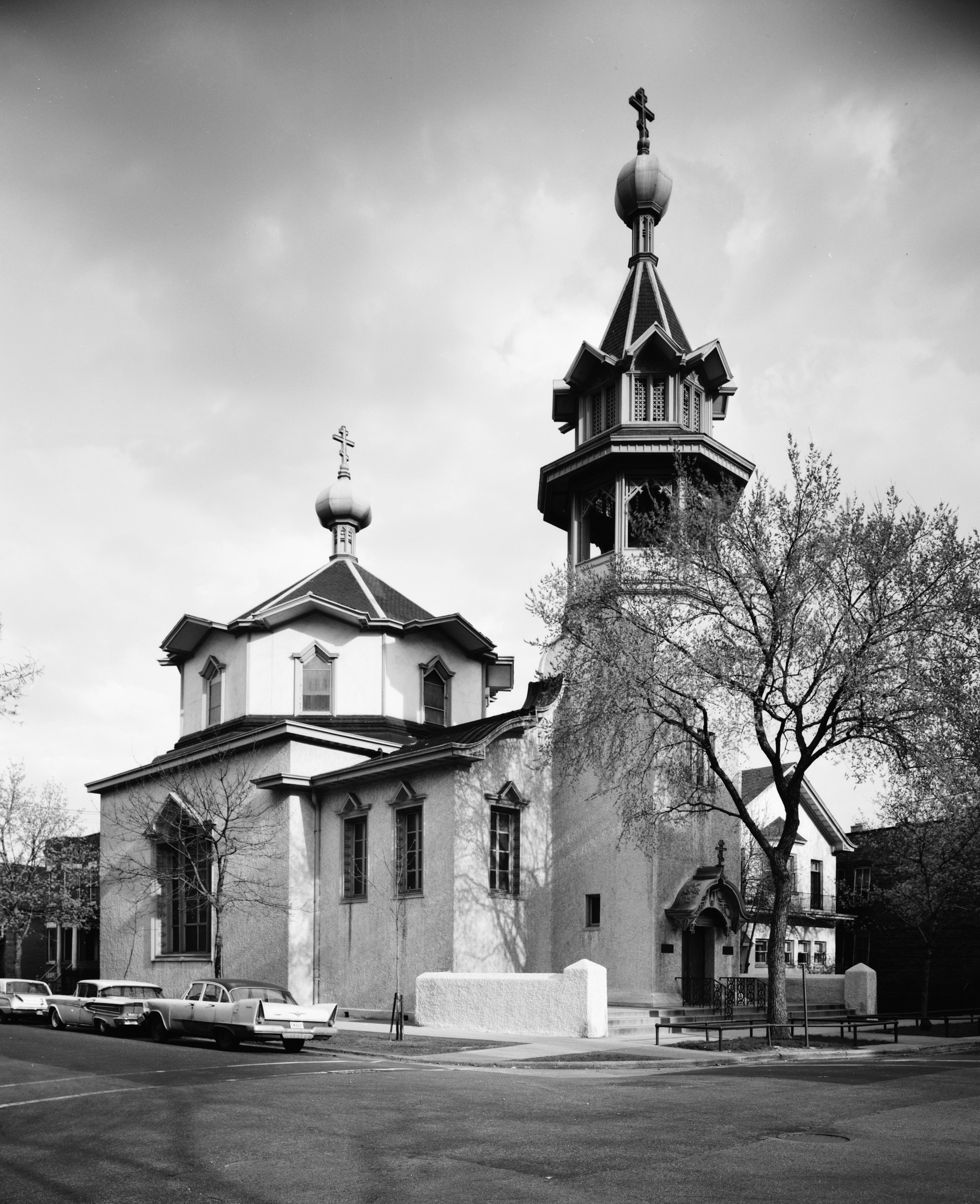
Holy Trinity Orthodox Cathedral in Chicago's Ukrainian Village

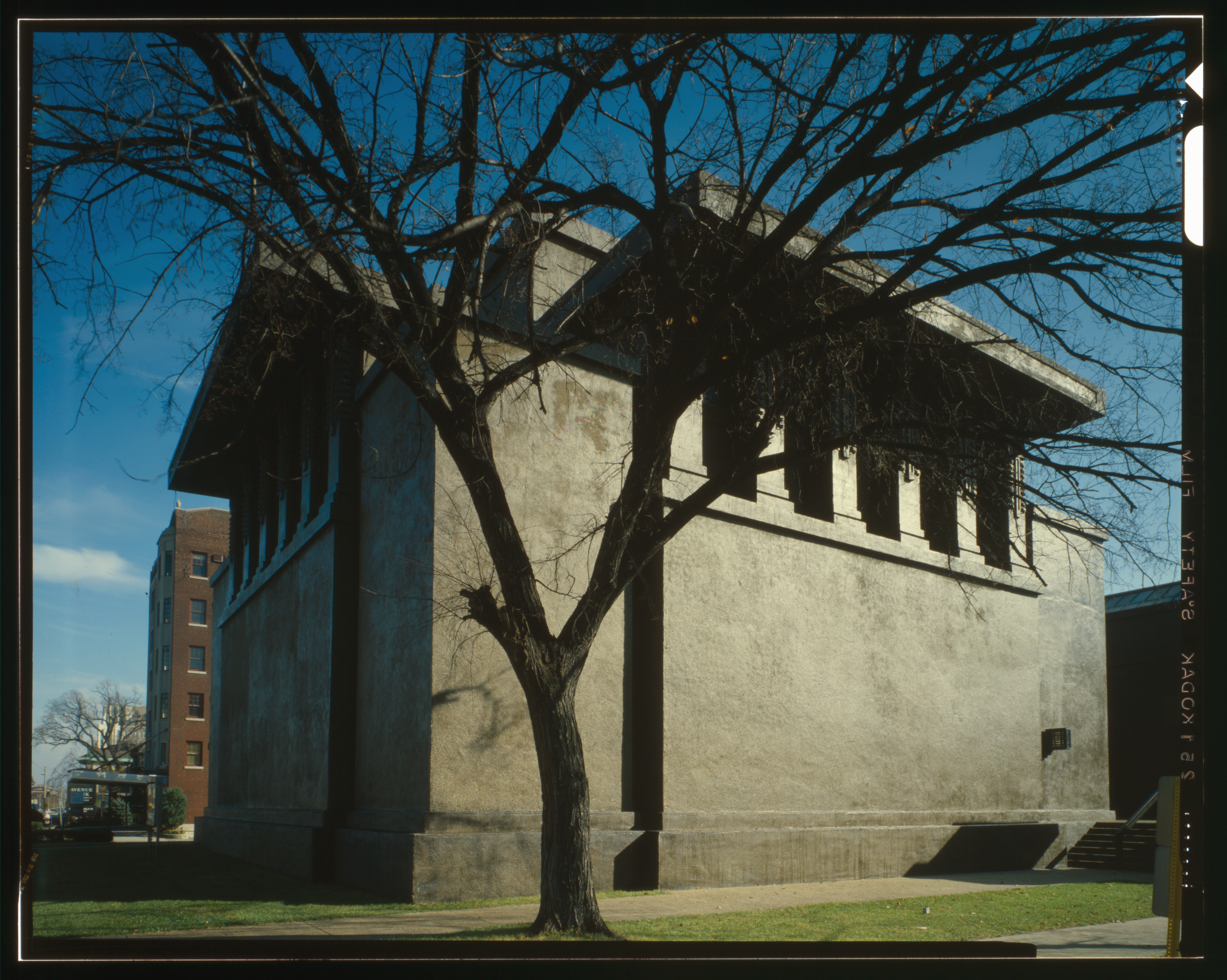
Unity Temple Unitarian Universalist church in Oak Park, Illinois

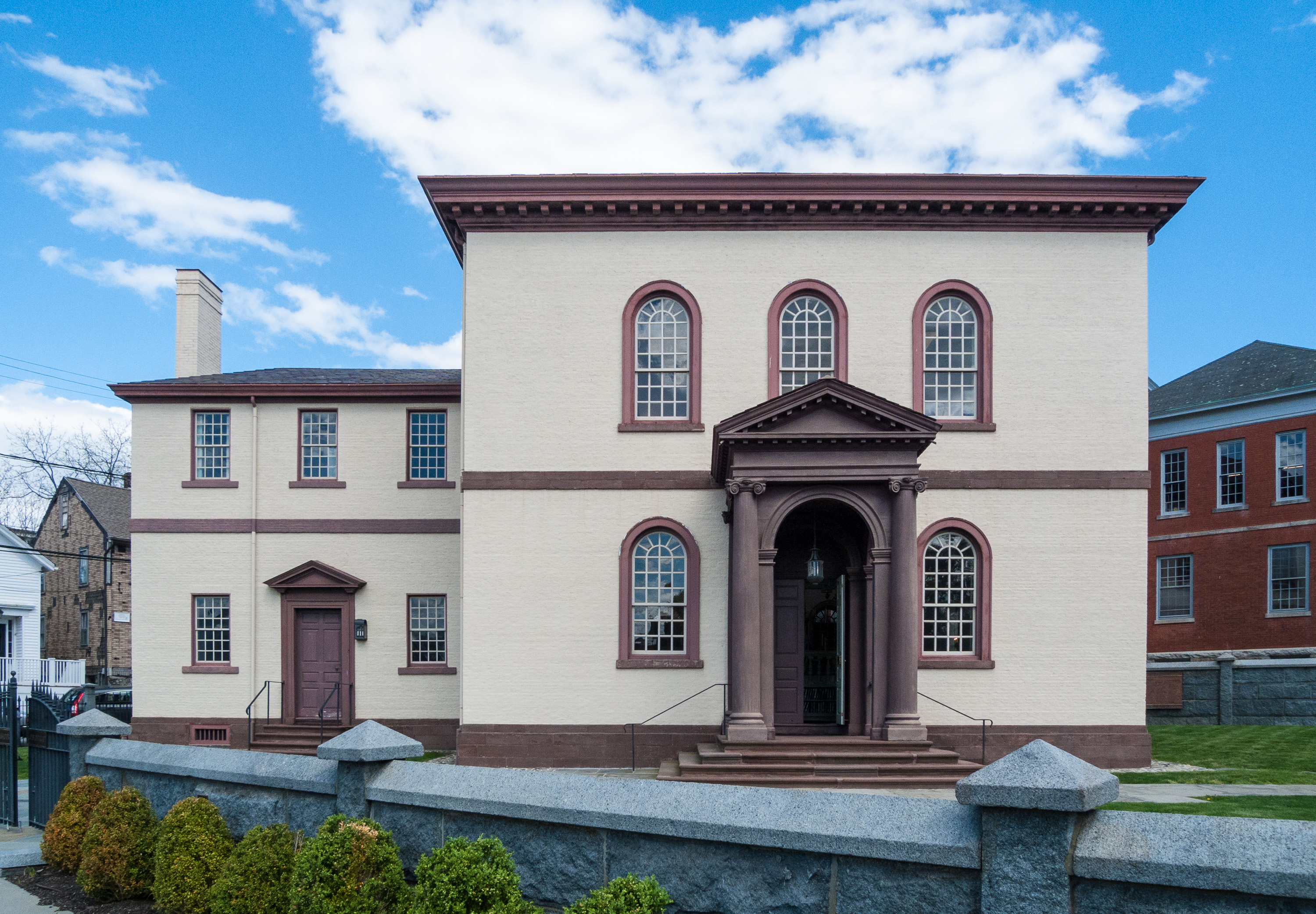
Touro Synagogue in Newport, Rhode Island is America's oldest surviving synagogue.

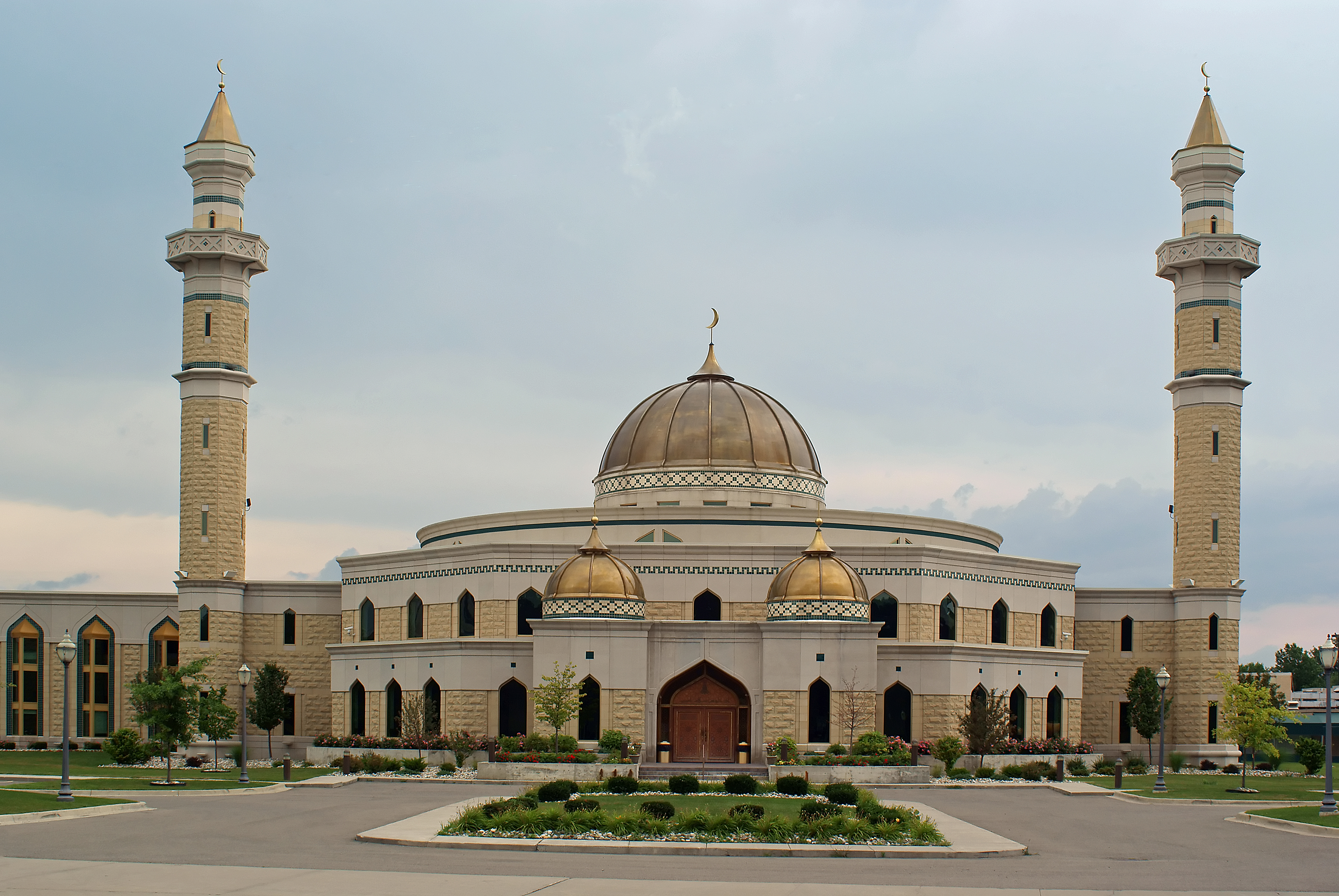
The Islamic Center of America in Dearborn, Michigan is the largest mosque in North America.

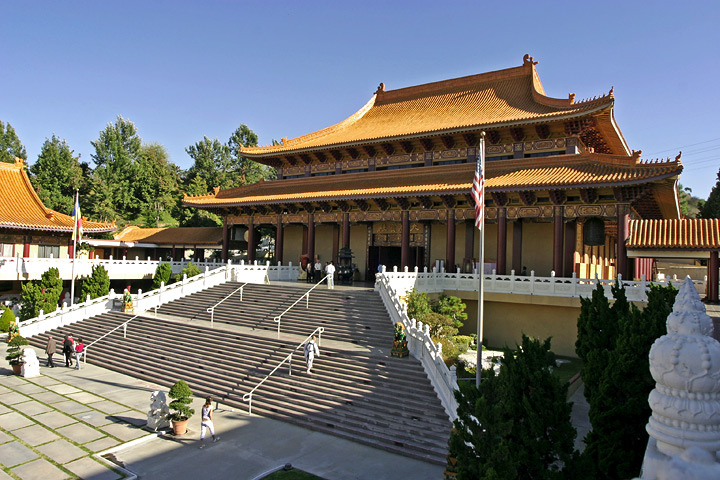
Hsi Lai Temple in Hacienda Heights, California is one of the largest Buddhist temples in the Western Hemisphere.

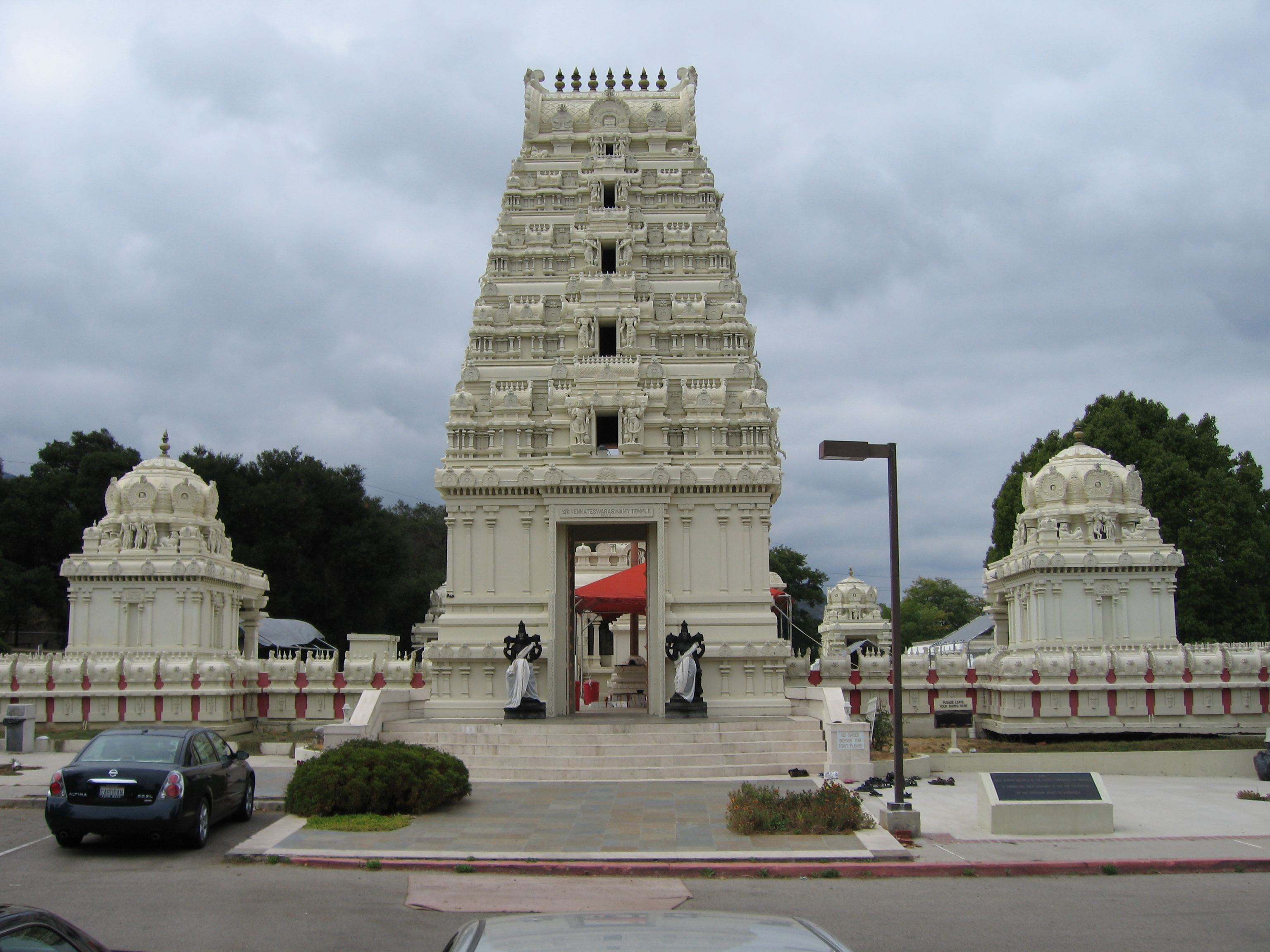
Hindu Temple in Malibu, California

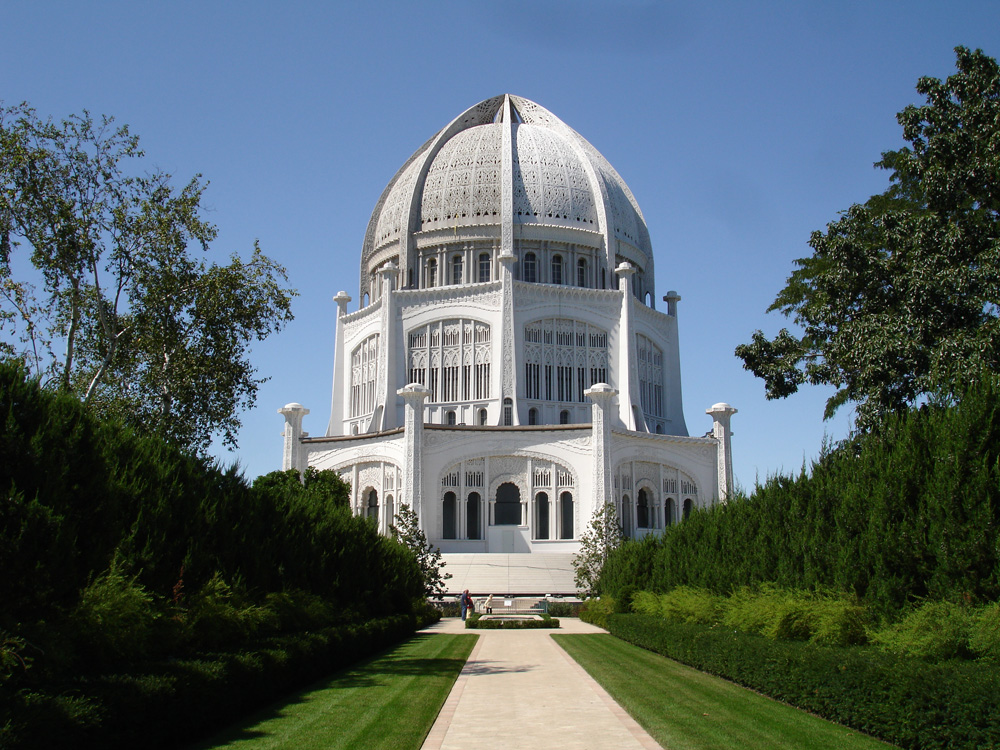
The Bahá'í House of Worship, in Wilmette, Illinois

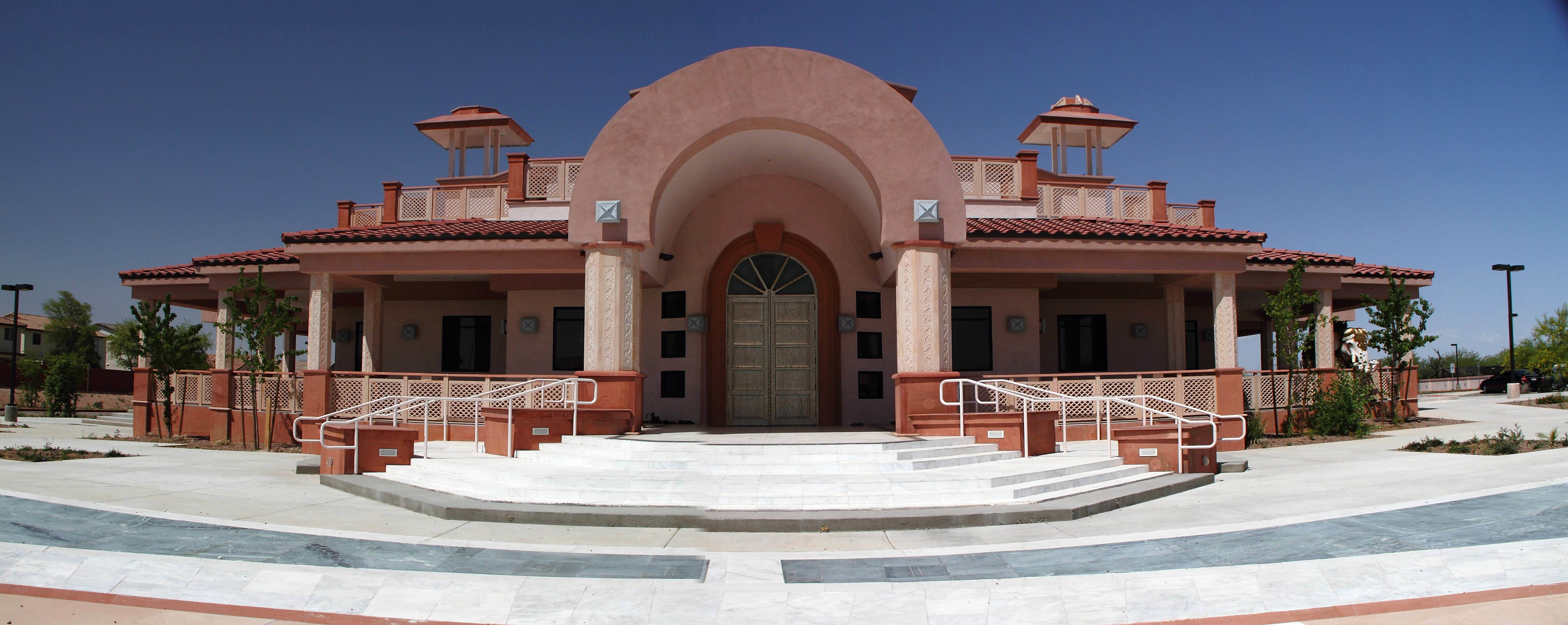
The Jain Center of Greater Phoenix (JCGP) in Phoenix, Arizona

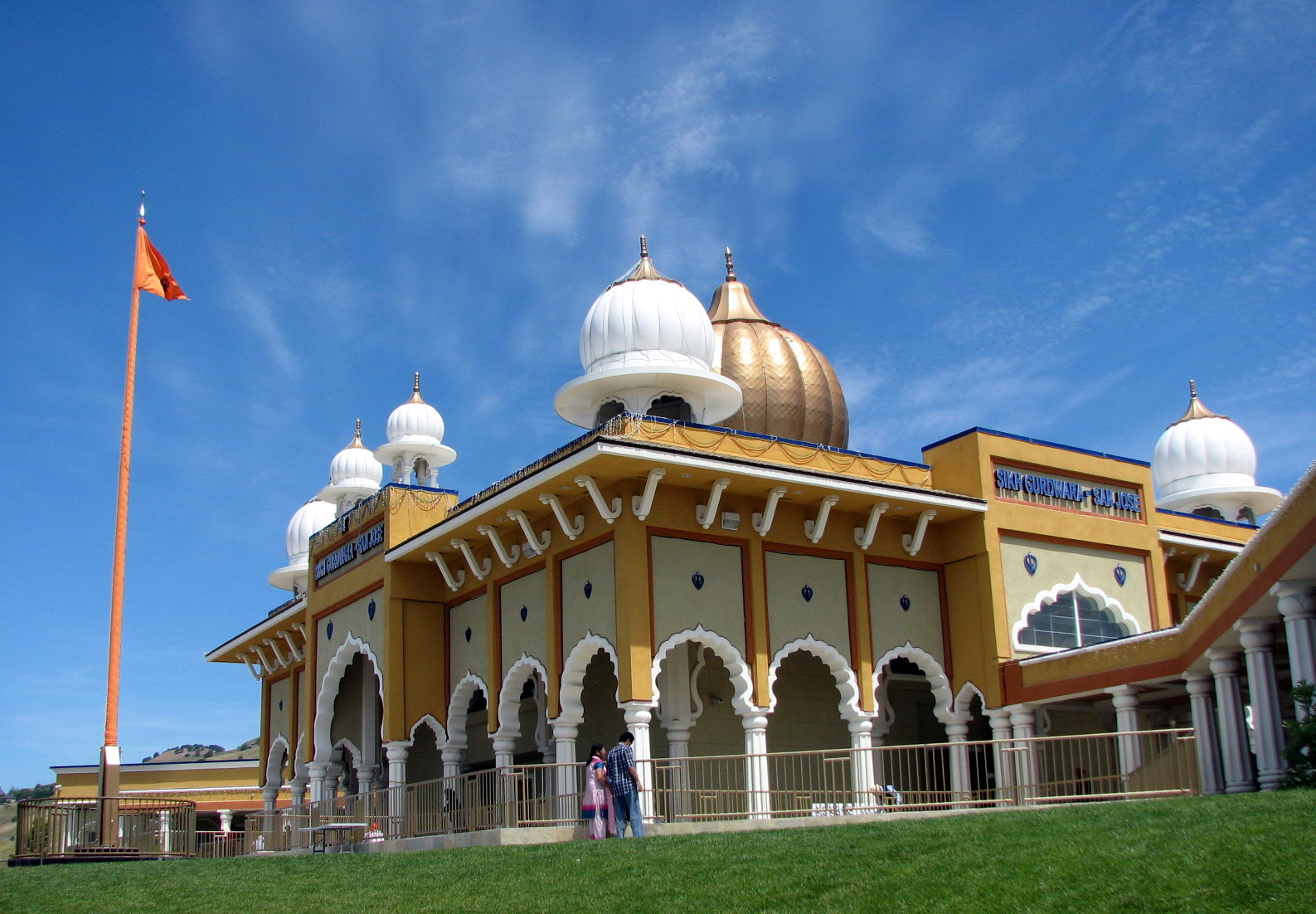
Sikh Gurdwara in Evergreen, San Jose, California

== Culture ==
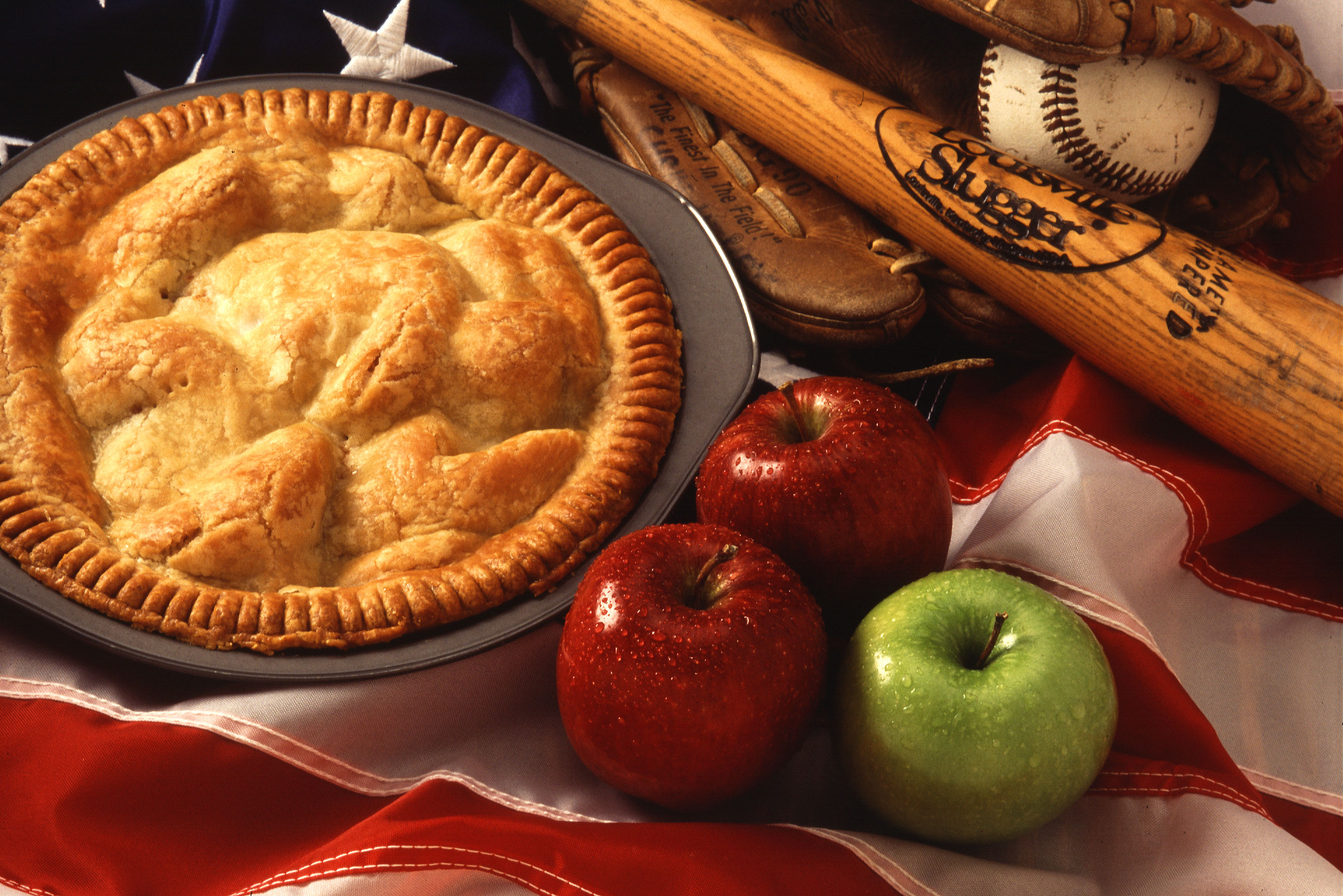
Apple pie and baseball are icons of American culture.

American culture is primarily a Western culture, but is influenced by Native American, West African, Latin American, East Asian, and Polynesian cultures.

The United States of America has its own unique social and cultural characteristics, such as dialect, music, arts, social habits, cuisine, and folklore.

Its chief early European influences came from English, Scottish, Welsh, and Irish settlers of colonial America during British rule. British culture, due to colonial ties with Britain that spread the English language, legal system and other cultural inheritances, had a formative influence. Other important influences came from other parts of Europe, especially Germany, France, and Italy.

Original elements also play a strong role, such as Jeffersonian democracy. Thomas Jefferson's Notes on the State of Virginia was perhaps the first influential domestic cultural critique by an American and a reaction to the prevailing European consensus that America's domestic originality was degenerate. Prevalent ideas and ideals that evolved domestically, such as national holidays, uniquely American sports, military tradition, and innovations in the arts and entertainment give a strong sense of national pride among the population as a whole.

American culture includes both conservative and liberal elements, scientific and religious competitiveness, political structures, risk taking and free expression, materialist and moral elements. Despite certain consistent ideological principles (e.g. individualism, egalitarianism, faith in freedom and democracy), the American culture has a variety of expressions due to its geographical scale and demographic diversity.

== Diaspora ==
Map of the American diaspora in the world (includes people with American citizenship or children of Americans): United States + 1,000,000 + 100,000 + 10,000 + 1,000

Americans have migrated to many places around the world, including Argentina, Australia, Brazil, Canada, Chile, China, Costa Rica, France, Germany, Hong Kong, India, Japan, Mexico, New Zealand, Pakistan, the Philippines, South Korea, the United Arab Emirates, and the United Kingdom. Unlike migration from other countries, United States migration is not concentrated in specific countries, possibly as a result of the roots of immigration from so many different countries to the United States. As of 2016, there were approximately 9 million United States citizens living outside of the United States. As the result of U.S. tax and financial reporting requirements that apply to non-resident citizens, record numbers of American citizens renounced their U.S. citizenship in the decade from 2010 to 2020. In 2024 a new organization was created to lobby the U.S. Congress for relief from citizenship-based taxation that is often cited as the reason for the record renunciations.

== See also ==
- American studies
- Ancestry of the people of the United States
- Birthright citizenship in the United States
- Demonyms for the United States
- Deportation of Americans from the United States
- Hyphenated American
- Making North America (2015 PBS film)
- Stereotypes of Americans
