= Pacific Islander Americans =

People of Pacific Islander descent in the United States

- Distribution of Pacific Islanders alone or in combination in 2020

Total population
- Alone (one race) ▲689,966 (2020 census) ▲0.21% of the total US population In combination (multiracial) ▲896,497 (2020 census) ▲0.27% of the total US population Alone or in combination ▲1,586,463 (2020 census) ▲0.48% of the total US population

Regions with significant populations
- Predominantly in Hawaii, American Samoa, Guam, and the Northern Mariana Islands
- Hawaii: 157,445
- California: 157,263
- (Washington (state)) Washington: 64,933
- Utah: 36,930
- Texas: 33,611

Languages
- American English, Oceanic languages

Religion
- Christianity, Polytheism, Baháʼí, Judaism, Mormonism, Hinduism, Buddhism, Taoism, Islam, Sikhism, Jainism, Confucianism

Related ethnic groups
- Pasifika New Zealanders, other Pacific Islanders

Pacific Islander Americans (also colloquially referred to as Islander Americans) are Americans who are of Pacific Islander ancestry (or are descendants of the Indigenous peoples of Oceania). Pacific Islander Americans make up 0.5% of the US population including those with partial Pacific Islander ancestry, enumerating about 1.4 million people. The largest ethnic subgroups of Pacific Islander Americans are Native Hawaiians, Samoans, and Chamorros. Much of the Pacific Islander population resides in Hawaii, Alaska, California, Utah, Texas, and Minnesota.

Pacific Islanders may be considered Oceanian Americans, but this group may include Australians and New Zealander-origin people, who can be of non-Pacific Islander ethnicity. Many Pacific Islander Americans are mixed with other races, especially Europeans and Asians, due to Pacific Islanders being a small population in several communities across the mainland US.

For its purposes, the United States census also counts Indigenous Australians as part of this group. The category is not defined to include Filipino Americans, Indonesian Americans, Japanese Americans or Taiwanese Americans, who are categorized as Asian American. It also does not include indigenous peoples of the Aleutian Islands, who are categorized as Alaskan Natives. Pacific Islander Americans are often grouped with Asian Americans under the wider Asian Pacific American umbrella.

American Samoa, Guam, and the Northern Mariana Islands are insular areas (US territories), while Hawaii is a state.

== History ==
=== First stage: Hawaiian migration (18th-19th centuries) ===
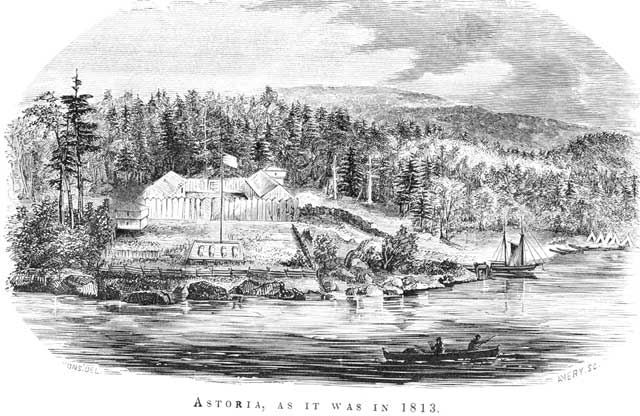
Gabriel Franchère's 1813 sketch of Fort Astoria

Migration from Oceania to the United States began in the last decade of the 18th century, but the first migrants to arrive in the country were Native Hawaiians. People from other Oceanian backgrounds (except Australians and Māori) did not migrate to the United States until the late 19th century. The first Native Hawaiians to live in the present-day US were fur traders. They were hired by British fur traders in Hawaii and taken to the Northwestern US, from where trade networks developed with Honolulu. However, they charged less than Americans for doing the same jobs and returned to Hawaii when their contracts ended. The first Native Hawaiians to live permanently in the US settled in the Astoria colony (in present-day Oregon) in 1811, having been brought there by its founder, fur merchant John Jacob Astor. Astor created the Pacific Fur Company in the colony and used the Native Hawaiians to build the city's infrastructure and houses and to develop the primary sector (agriculture, hunting and fishing). The labor employment of the Native Hawaiians was done to make them serve the company (although later, most of them worked for North West Company when this company absorbed the Pacific Fur Company in 1813).

After 1813, Native Hawaiians continued to migrate to the Pacific Northwest. They migrated to work in companies such as the Hudson's Bay Company (which absorbed the North West Company in 1821) and the Columbia Fishing and Trading Company, as well as in Christian missions. Since 1819, some groups of Polynesian Protestant students immigrated to the United States to study theology. Since the 1830s, another group of Native Hawaiians arrived on California's shores, where they were traders and formed communities. So, they made up 10% of the population of Yerba Buena, now San Francisco, in 1847. During the California gold rush, many other Native Hawaiians migrated to California to work as miners.

In 1889, the first Polynesian Mormon colony was founded in Utah and consisted of Native Hawaiians, Tahitians, Samoans, and Māori. Also in the late 19th century, small groups of Pacific Islanders, usually sailors, moved to the western shores, mainly on San Francisco. Later, the US occupied Hawaii in 1896, Guam in 1898, and American Samoa in 1900. This fact diversified Oceanian emigration in the US.

=== Second stage (20th-21st centuries) ===
However, the first record of non-Hawaiian Pacific Islanders in the US is from 1910, with the first Guamanians living in the US. In the following decades small groups of people from islands such as Hawaii, Guam, Tonga, or American Samoa immigrated to the US. Many of them were Mormons (including most of Tongans and American Samoans), who immigrated to help build Mormon churches, or to seek an education, either in Laie or Salt Lake City. However, the immigration of Pacific Islanders to the US was small until the end of World War II, when many American Samoans, Guamanians (who got the American citizenship in 1929), and Tongans immigrated to the US. Most of them were in the military or married with military people, but some Pacific Islanders, particularly Tongans, looked for a job in several religious and cultural centers. Since then the immigration increased and diversified every decade, with a majority immigrating to the Western urban areas and Hawaii.

This increase and diversification in the Oceanian emigration was especially true in the 1950s. In 1950, the population of Guam gained full American citizenship. In 1952, the natives of American Samoa become American nationals, although not American citizens, through the Immigration and Nationality Act of 1952. Shortly thereafter, the first major waves of migration from American Samoa and Guam emerged, while other groups of places such as French Polynesia, Palau, or Fiji began to emigrate. Over 5,100 Pacific Islanders immigrated to the United States in the 1950s, mostly from American Samoa, Guam, and Tonga. The first of them were Samoan military personnel, who had worked at the American bases of Pago Pago but moved to the Honolulu's American bases when American Samoa began to be administered by the US Department of the Interior, as well as their relatives. Most of the new Pacific Islander immigrants were Mormons and many islanders from the region immigrated to the US seeking economic opportunities.

In 1959, Hawaii became a state and its natives got US citizenship. This made more than 630,000 people Americans; many of them were Pacific Islanders, both Native Hawaiians and people of other Oceanian origins. Thus, the Hawaiian migration to the continental US began to increase. In the 1960s, many more Pacific Islanders emigrated to the US, mainly due to increased migration from Guam, Fiji, Tonga, and Samoa archipelago (both independent and American Samoa). The Pacific Islanders migrated by diverse reasons: Many Guamanians fled the Korean War and Typhoon Karen, and the Fijian population living in the US skyrocketed from a few dozen people in the 1950s to more than 400 people. The Pacific Islander migration increased especially since 1965, when the United States government facilitated the non-European migration to the US. Many of them were recruited to pick fruit in California.

During the 1970s, over nine thousand Pacific Islanders migrated to the US, mostly from Samoa (both Western and American), Guam, Tonga, and Fiji, but also from other islands such as Federated States of Micronesia or Palau. Many of these people immigrated to the US to study at its universities. Moreover, in the 1980s, migration from the Pacific Islands to the United States became more diversified when this country acquired the Northern Marianas Islands in 1986 and signed an agreement with TTPI (FSM, Palau and the Marshall Islands) called the Compact of Free Association. The Compact of Free Association allows the inhabitants from TTPI to travel and work in the US without visas. (Note: The Trust Territory of the Pacific Islands (TTPI) was a United Nations territory administrated by United States since 1944 until 1986/94 (depending on the country), although it did not belong to the US.) On the other hand, the Tyson Foods company, which employed a significant part of the population of the Marshall Islands, relocated many of its Marshellese employees in Springdale, Arkansas, where the company is based. However, most of Pacific Islanders continued to migrate to western urban areas and Hawaii. More of five thousand Pacific Islanders migrated to the US in the 1990s, settling mostly in western cities such as Los Angeles, San Francisco, Seattle, or Salt Lake City. In the 2000 US census, almost all the countries of Oceania were mentioned, although only the ethnic groups mentioned in the article consisted of thousands of people. In the 2000s and 2010s, several thousands more Pacific Islanders immigrated to the US.

== Population ==
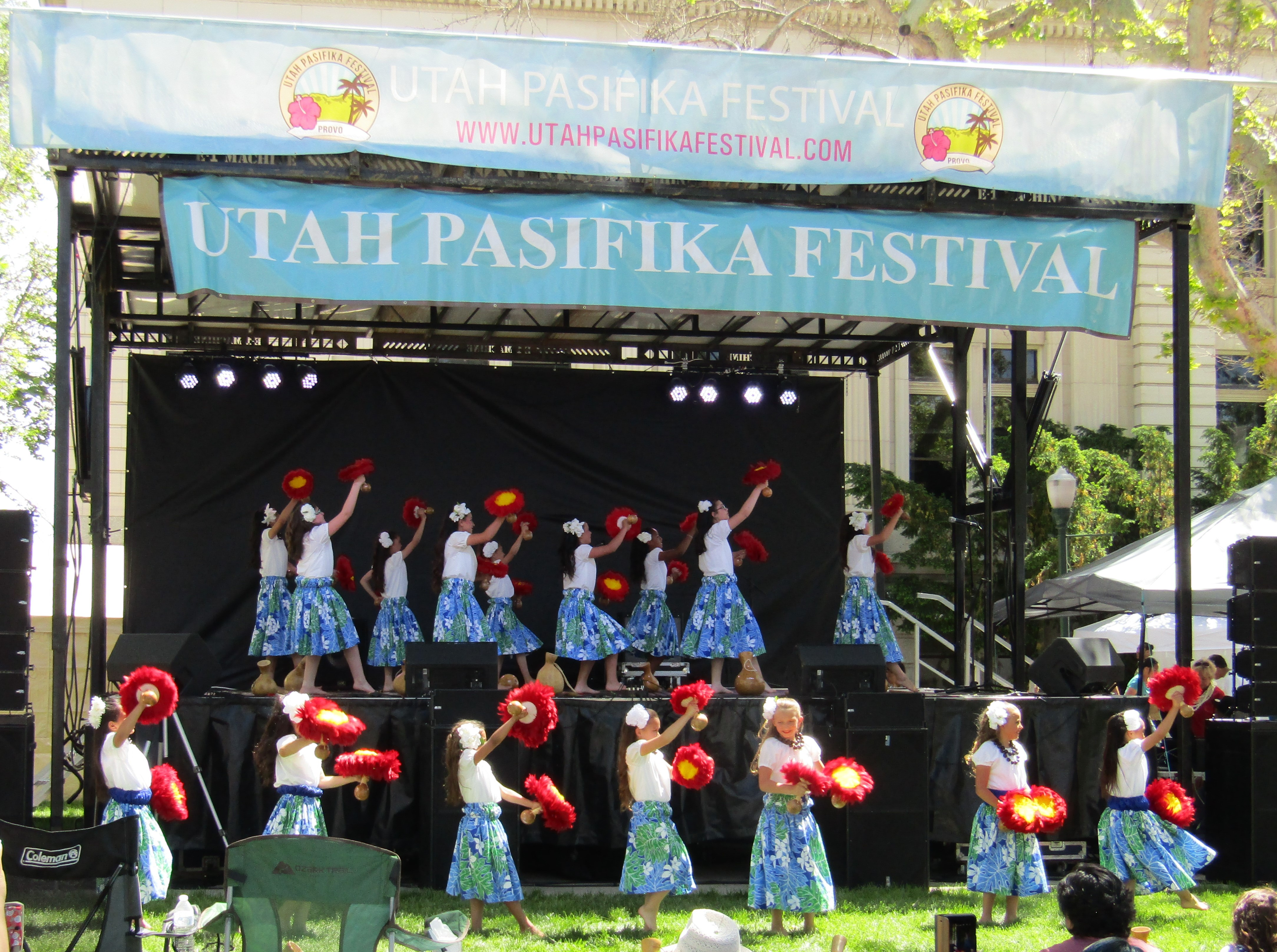
Utah Pasifika Festival

=== Demography ===
In the 2000 and 2010 censuses, the term "Native Hawaiian or other Pacific Islander" refers to people having origins in any of the original peoples of Hawaii, Guam, Tonga, Samoa, Fiji, New Zealand, and the Marshalls or other Pacific Islands. Most Pacific Islander Americans are of Native Hawaiian, Samoan, and Chamorro origin.

The fact that Hawaii is a US state (meaning that almost the entire native Hawaiian population lives in the US), as well as the migration and high birth rate of the Pacific Islanders have favored the permanence and increase of this population in the US (especially in the number of people who are of partial Pacific Islander descent). In the 2000 census, over 800,000 people claimed to be of Pacific Islander descent and in the 2010 census 1,225,195 Americans claimed "'Native Hawaiian or other Pacific Islander'" as their race alone or in combination. Most of them live in urban areas of Hawaii and California, but they also have sizeable populations in Washington, Utah, Nevada, Oregon, Texas, Florida, Wisconsin, Arizona, and New York. On the other hand, Pacific Islander Americans represent the majority (or are the main ethnic group) in American Samoa, Guam, and the Northern Mariana Islands, where many of them are natives.

=== Areas of origin ===
==== Melanesian Americans ====
Melanesian Americans are Americans of Melanesian descent.

Most of them are of Fijian descent. Most Fijian Americans are of Fijian and Indian descent. More than 32,000 people of Fijian origin live in the US. Most of them live in California.

Smaller communities of New Caledonian, Papuan, Vanuatuan, and Solomon Islander origin also live in the US.

==== Micronesian Americans ====
Micronesian Americans are Americans of Micronesian descent. They come from the whole region, mainly from the Mariana Islands, but also from territories as the Marshall Islands, the Federated States of Micronesia or Palau.

There are more than 8,000 people living in the US whose origins are in the Federated States of Micronesia. Most of them live in Hawaii, California, Oregon, and Texas, as well as in Mariana Islands. Another 7,000 Americans are of Palauan descent.

According to the 2010 census, the largest Chamorro populations were located in California, Washington, and Texas, but their combined number from these three states totaled less than half the number living throughout the US. It also revealed that the Chamorro people are the most geographically dispersed Oceanian ethnicity in the country.

Marshallese Americans come from the Marshall Islands. In the 2010 census, 22,434 Americans identified as being of Marshallese descent. Due to the Marshall Islands entering the Compact of Free Association in 1986, Marshallese have been allowed to migrate and work in the US. There are many reasons why Marshallese moved to the US. Some Marshallese moved for educational opportunities, particularly for their children. Others sought work or better health care than what is available in the islands. Massive layoffs by the Marshallese government in 2000 led to a second big wave of immigration. Arkansas has the largest Marshallese population with over 6,000 residents. Many live in Springdale, and the Marshallese constitute over 5% of the city's population. Other significant Marshallese populations include Spokane and Costa Mesa.

Smaller communities of I-Kiribati and Nauruan origins also live in the US.

==== Polynesian Americans ====
Polynesian Americans are Americans of Polynesian descent.

Large subcategories of Polynesian Americans include Native Hawaiians and Samoan Americans. In addition there are smaller communities of Tongan Americans, French Polynesian Americans, and Māori Americans.

There is a notable Native Hawaiian presence in Las Vegas. The city is sometimes called the "Ninth Island" in reference to the eight islands of Hawaii.

A Samoan American is an American who is of ethnic Samoan descent from either the independent nation Samoa or the American territory of American Samoa. Samoan American is a subcategory of Polynesian American. About 55,000 people live on American Samoa, while the 2000 and 2008 US censuses have found four times the number of Samoan Americans live in the mainland US. California has the most Samoans; concentrations live in the San Francisco Bay Area, Los Angeles County, and San Diego County. San Francisco has approximately 2,000 people of Samoan ancestry, and other Bay Area cities such as East Palo Alto and Daly City have Samoan communities. In Los Angeles County, Long Beach and Carson have abundant Samoan communities, as well as in Oceanside in San Diego County. Other West Coast metropolitan areas such as Seattle have strong Samoan communities, mainly in King County and in Tacoma. Anchorage, Alaska, and Honolulu, Hawaii, both have thousands of Samoan Americans residing in each city. Persons born in American Samoa are US nationals, but not US citizens (this is the only circumstance under which an individual would be one and not the other). For this reason, Samoans can move to Hawaii or the mainland US and obtain citizenship comparatively easily. Like Native Hawaiians, Samoans arrived in the mainland in the 20th century as agricultural laborers and factory workers. Elsewhere in the US, Samoan Americans are plentiful throughout the state of Utah, as well as in Killeen, Texas; Norfolk, Virginia; and Independence, Missouri.

A Tongan American is an American who is of ethnic Tongan descent. Utah has the largest Tongan American population, followed by Hawaii. Many of the first Tongan Americans moved to the United States in connection to the Church of Jesus Christ of Latter-day Saints. They have strong presence in parts of Salt Lake Valley in Utah, especially West Valley City and Salt Lake City. Utah is roughly one percent Tongan, a high rate compared to Tongans only making up less than a scant 0.02% of the US population. Tongan communities are also more common in the West Coast, such as San Mateo County, some areas of the South Bay of Los Angeles, and the Seattle-Tacoma metropolitan area of Washington. Portland, Oregon is also home to a Tongan community that started to emigrate in the 1970s. The Dallas, Texas suburb of Euless also has a Tongan population in the low thousands.

=== Origins (alone or in any combination) ===
Pacific Islander Americans in the 2020 United States censuses
Ancestry	Flag	2020	
Ancestry	Flag	Numbers	%
Native Hawaiian		680,442	0.21%
Samoan		296,997	0.090%
"Pacific Islander" (not specified)		261,391	0.078%
Chamorro		149,313 (Guamanian or Chamorro: 143,947 "Carolinian": 1,366; Saipanese: 1,143; Northern Mariana Islander: 553)	0.0446% (Guamanian or Chamorro: 0.0434% "Carolinian": 0.0004% Saipanese: 0.0003% Northern Mariana Islander: 0.0002%)
Tongan		78,871	0.024%
Fijian		54,383 ("Fijian": 54,006; Rotuman: 377)	0.017% (0.016% 0.0001%)
Marshallese		52,624	0.016%
"Micronesian" (not specified)		45,364	0.014%
Micronesian (FSM)		21,596 (Chuukese: 12,464; Pohnpeian: 4,918; Kosraean: 2,148; Yapese: 2,066)	0.0065% (Chuukese: 0.0038% Pohnpeian: 0.0015% Kosraean: 0.0006% Yapese: 0.0006%)
Palauan		12,202	0.004%
"Polynesian" (not specified)		9,092	0.003%
French Polynesian		8,689 ("Tahitian": 7,935 "French Polynesian": 754)	0.0026% ("Tahitian": 0.0024% "French Polynesian": 0.0002%)
Māori		7,664	0.002%
Papua New Guinean		1,453	0.0004%
Tokelaun		1,207	0.0004%
"Melanesian" (not specified)		937	0.0003%
I-Kiribati		831	0.0003%
Niuean		569	0.0002%
Cook Islander		545	0.0002%
Tuvaluan		399	0.0001%
New Caledonian		265	0.00008%
Ni-Vanuatu		262	0.00008%
Solomonese		220	0.00007%
Easter Islander		208	0.00006%
Nauruan		68	0.00002%
Wallis and Futanan		56	0.00002%
Total Pacific Islander American population		1,586,463	100.0%

=== Location ===
State/territory	Pacific Islander Americans alone or in combination (2010 US census)	Percentage (Pacific Islander)	Pacific Islander Americans alone or in combination (2020 US census)	Percentage (Pacific Islander) (Note: Percentage of the state population that identifies itself as Pacific Islanders relative to the state/territory population as a whole — the percentage is of Pacific Islander Americans alone.)
Alabama	7,984		7,479	0.1%
Alaska	11,360		18,668	2.5%
American Samoa	52,790		46,233 (44,090 alone)	93.0% (88.7%)
Arizona	28,431		37,212	0.5%
Arkansas	8,597		17,874	0.6%
California	320,036		337,617	0.9%
Colorado	16,823		24,714	0.4%
Connecticut	6,864		5,971	0.2%
Delaware	1,423		1,547	0.2%
District of Columbia	1,514		1,494	0.2%
Florida	43,416		44,454	0.2%
Georgia	18,587		19,020	0.2%
Guam	90,238	56.6%	83,359	49,3%
Hawaii	358,951		394,102	27.1%
Idaho	5,508		9,293	0.5%
Illinois	15,873		16,842	0.1%
Indiana	7,392		12,015	0.2%
Iowa	4,173		10,073	0.3%
Kansas	5,445		7,890	0.3%
Kentucky	5,698		8,449	0.2%
Louisiana	5,333		6,100	0.1%
Maine	1,008		1,619	0.1%
Maryland	11,553		11,440	0.2%
Massachusetts	12,369		10,436	0.1%
Michigan	10,010		11,255	0.1%
Minnesota	6,819		9,387	0.2%
Mississippi	3,228		3,235	0.1%
Missouri	12,136		17,870	0.3%
Montana	1,794		3,101	0.3%
Nebraska	3,551		4,069	0.2%
Nevada	35,435		52,532	1.7%
New Hampshire	1,236		1,792	0.1%
New Jersey	15,777		14,621	0.2%
New Mexico	5,750		6,012	0.3%
New York	45,801		40,578	0.2%
North Carolina	17,891		20,957	0.2%
North Dakota	801		2,086	0.3%
Northern Mariana Islands	24,891	46.2%	19,421	34.9%
Ohio	11,380		15,181	0.1%
Oklahoma	9,052		15,026	0.4%
Oregon	26,936		39,709	0.9%
Pennsylvania	14,662		16,532	0.1%
Puerto Rico	370		4,169	0.1%
Rhode Island	2,803		2,331	0.2%
South Carolina	6,988		8,737	0.2%
South Dakota	1,040		1,642	0.2%
Tennessee	9,359		11,008	0.2%
Texas	54,801		77,196	0.3%
Utah	37,994		59,247	1.8%
Vermont	476		0,725	0.1%
Virgin Islands (US)	212			
Virginia	17,233		22,226	0.3%
Washington	73,213		114,189	1.5%
West Virginia	1,295		1,726	0.1%
Wisconsin	5,558		7,470	0.1%
Wyoming	1,137		1,714	0.3%
United States	1,332,494	0.4%	1,586,463	0.5%

== Military ==
Based on 2003 recruiting data, Pacific Islander Americans were 249% over-represented in the military.

American Samoans are distinguished among the wider Pacific Islander group for enthusiasm for enlistment. In 2007, a Chicago Tribune reporter covering the island's military service noted, "American Samoa is one of the few places in the nation where military recruiters not only meet their enlistment quotas but soundly exceed them." As of March 23, 2009, there have been 10 American Samoans who have died in Iraq, and 2 who have died in Afghanistan.

Pacific Islander Americans are also represented in the United States Navy SEALs, making up .6% of the enlisted and .1% of the officers.
