= French Polynesian Americans =

American citizens of French Polynesian origin

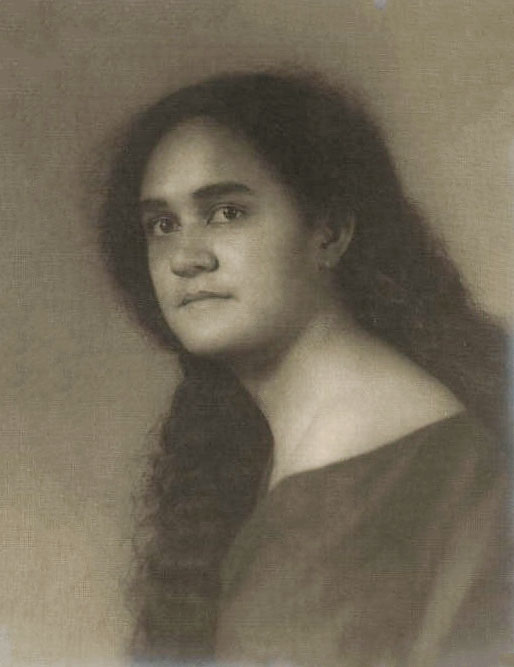
- Tahitian-Hawaiian girl, 1909

Regions with significant populations
- Hawaii and California. Slightly smaller communities live in Utah, Washington, Massachusetts, Illinois (Chicago) and New York City metropolitan area
- United States: 8,689 (2020 census)
- French Polynesia: 419 (2024)

Languages
- French, Tahitian, American English

Religion
- Christianity

Related ethnic groups
- French people · other American groups of Polynesian origin (Maori, Native Hawaiians, Samoan, Tongan)

French Polynesian American are Americans with French Polynesian ancestry. The number of French Polynesian Americans is unknown. In the 2020 US census 7,935 people claimed to be of Tahitian origin while another 754 people claimed to be of "French Polynesian" origin, without specifying the island of origin. Thus, more than 8,000 people claimed some form of French Polynesian ancestry. In addition, others 9,092 people asserted be of Polynesian origins, but they indicated no specific origin.

== History ==
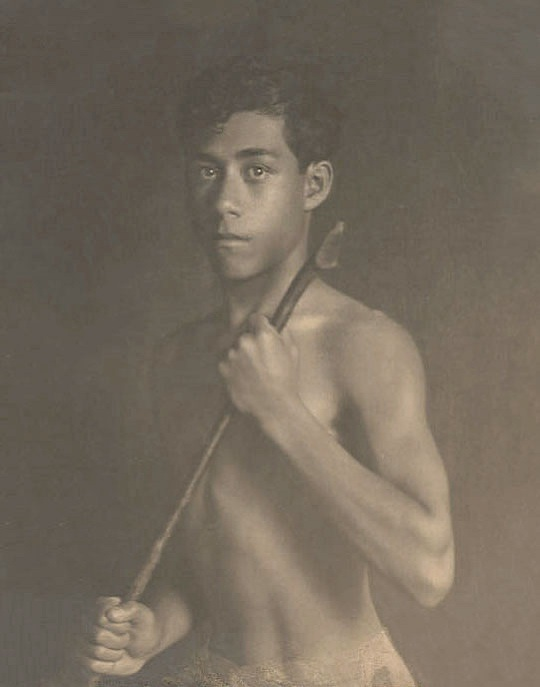
Tahitian-Hawaiian boy, 1909

Between 1800s and 1860s, Pacific Islander sailors arrived in the United States. Some of them were Tahitians, who settled in Massachusetts and later California. In 1889, the first Polynesian Mormon colony was founded in Utah and consisted of Tahitians, Native Hawaiians, Samoans, and Māori people.

During the 20th century, the annual number of French Polynesians who moved to the US was small but with certain growth between the 1950 and 70s. So, while in 1954 just three French Polynesians arrived in the United States, in 1956 entry of 14 French Polynesian immigrants it was recorded and in 1965 were admitted other 49 people of same origin.

However, since the 1970s, the number of French Polynesians admitted each year has been more varied: in 1975, 47 French Polynesians were admitted, increasing to 59 admitted in 1984, then decreasing to 19 in 1986. For its part, in 1991 it was registered that 31 French Polynesians emigrated to US with legal status in this year and, in 1997, other 21 French Polynesians obtained admission to live in the US.

== Culture and Demography ==
Tahitian Americans celebrate the French Polynesian celebration of Bastille Day on July 14. This date is known as France's independence day in French-speaking countries.

Half of Tahitian Americans reside in the state of Hawaii. Hawaii's population is 0.2% Tahitian.

== Notable people ==
- Vaitiare Bandera, actress
- Frank Grouard, Scout and interpreter in the American Indian Wars
- Conrad Hall, cinematographer
- Cole Hikutini, American football player
