= Jerome Morfaw =

Australian American judoka

Personal information
- Nationality: Australia United States Cameroon
- Born: 20 February 1984 (age 42)
- Education: Bond University

Sport
- Sport: Judo
- Weight class: -100 kg

Jerome Morfaw (born February 20, 1984) is an Australian American Cameroonian judoka, who competes in the -100 kg category, as a member of the Cameroon national team.
