= Maria Maea =

Maria Maea is a multidisciplinary artist who works in performance, installation, film, and sound.

== Biography ==
Maria Maea was born in Long Beach, California in 1988. She is a first generation artist and is of Samoan and Mexican descent. She has worked collaboratively and on her own. Her love for art flourished as her work was meant to bring awareness in her community. Maea works the best in sound, sculpture, installation, and production. She strengthens her ties to ancestry, physical memory and land via her artistic endeavors. Her life experiences in relation to her culture is reflected in her artwork. She creates sculptures that resemble sets that are seen in movies and have to do with narrative using plants and recycles resources objects that she collected around Los Angeles. She also collects products from her home garden and the Los Angeles River. Having worked in film production, she is aware of the unseen efforts and procedures that take place and produces pieces that transport audiences to view her art from different perspectives.

== Art ==
She creates sculptures that span the line between representational and abstract art using palm fronds. One of Maria Maea's sculpture Matu, 2023, at the Hammer Museum in Los Angeles utilized ecological material and aspects of humanity. In this piece of work the term "Matu" means "immigrant" which encompassed her parents immigrating from Mexico. Her art contained many acts of symbolism with her family members hand and face as symbolism. Trees are used to encapsulate a traditional media in Samoan craft culture. Her artwork serves as reminder that memory is more than just physically and it frequently communicated with us with the offerings of nature as well as the love and appreciation she has for her family. Some of her art includes: Deep Water, 2019, which was shown at Murmurs, in Los Angeles and All in Time, 2022, which was presented at the Residency Art Gallery in Inglewood.
