= Emily Patterson-Kane =

American animal welfare scientist

- Born: Hamilton, New Zealand
- Other name: Emily G. Patterson-Kane
- Education: University of Waikato (master's); Victoria University of Wellington (PhD)
- Known for: Animal welfare science research and textbooks
- Notable work: The Sciences of Animal Welfare (2008); Rethinking the American Animal Rights Movement (2022); Interdisciplinary Guide (2025)
- Scientific career
- Fields: Animal welfare science, animal psychology
- Workplaces: American Society for the Prevention of Cruelty to Animals; American Veterinary Medical Association

Emily Patterson-Kane is a Kiwi-American animal psychologist who specializes in animal welfare science.

== Early life and career ==
Patterson-Kane was born in Hamilton, New Zealand and obtained a master's degree from University of Waikato. She obtained a PhD in animal psychology from the Victoria University of Wellington in 1999. She did postdoctoral research in animal science at Purdue University and studied sustainable livestock systems at Scottish Agricultural College. She was an assistant professor in psychology at Bradley University and Victoria University. In 2007, she accepted position of animal welfare scientist for the American Veterinary Medical Association's Animal Welfare Division.

Patterson-Kane has co-authored Animal Welfare Science: an Inter-disciplinary Guide (2025), The Sciences of Animal Welfare (2008) and Rethinking the Animal Rights Movement (2022). She is currently Director of Research of the American Society for the Prevention of Cruelty to Animals (ASPCA).

== Selected publications ==
- Animal Welfare Science An Interdisciplinary Guide (2025, with Tina Rich)
- The Sciences of Animal Welfare (2008, with David Mellor and Kevin J. Stafford)
- History, Philosophies, and Concepts of Animal Welfare (2013, with Gail C. Golab)
- Rethinking the American Animal Rights Movement (2022, with Michael P. Allen and Jennifer Eadie)
