= Samoan Americans =

Americans of Samoan descent or immigrants from Samoa

Tagata Samoa i le Iunaite Sitete
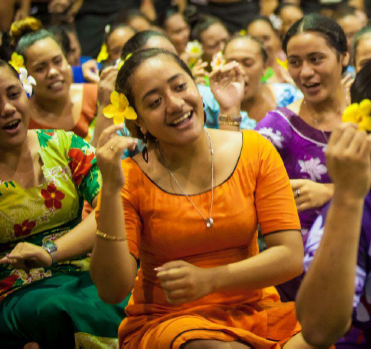
- American Samoan singers practice for Annual Flag Day competition

Total population
- 121,585 alone, 0.04% of US population 243,682 including partial ancestry, 0.06% (2021 census estimates)

Regions with significant populations
- American Samoa; Alaska (Anchorage, Barrow), Arizona (Phoenix), California (Los Angeles County, Orange County, Sacramento County, San Diego County, San Francisco Bay Area), Minnesota (Minneapolis-St Paul), Missouri (Independence), Nevada (Las Vegas), Hawaii, Oregon (Portland), Texas (Euless), Utah (Salt Lake County, Utah County), Washington (Seattle, Tacoma)

Languages
- American English, Samoan

Religion
- Christianity (Congregationalist, Catholic, Methodist, Assembly of God, Seventh-day Adventist, The Church of Jesus Christ of Latter Day Saints) and various non denomational Christian churches

Related ethnic groups
- Other Polynesians; Tongan Americans

Samoan Americans are Americans of Samoan origin, including those who emigrated from the United States Territory of American Samoa and immigrants from the Independent State of Samoa to the United States. Samoan Americans are Pacific Islanders in the United States census, and are the second largest Pacific Islander group in the US, after Native Hawaiians.

American Samoa has been an unincorporated territory of the United States since 1900, and Samoa, formally known as the Independent State of Samoa and known as Western Samoa until 1997, is an independent nation that gained its independence from New Zealand in 1962. American Samoa (which is under the jurisdiction of the United States of America) and Samoa together make up the Samoan Islands, an archipelago that covers 1,170 square miles (3,000 km^{2}). Like Native Hawaiians, the Samoans arrived on the mainland US in the 19th century serving in the US Armed Forces and working as fishermen, and later they often worked as agricultural laborers and factory workers.

As per 2021 US census estimates, there are over 240,000 people of Samoan descent living in the United States, including those of partial ancestry, which is roughly over the population of the Independent State of Samoa, as of 2021. Honolulu, Hawaii, has the largest Samoan population of over 12,000 making up over 2% of the city's population. There are large Samoan communities in Greater Los Angeles, Orange County, California, San Francisco Bay Area, and Greater San Diego counties in the state of California. Other states with cities and towns with significant communities are Alaska, Arizona, Missouri, Oregon, Nevada, Texas, Utah, and Washington.

== History ==
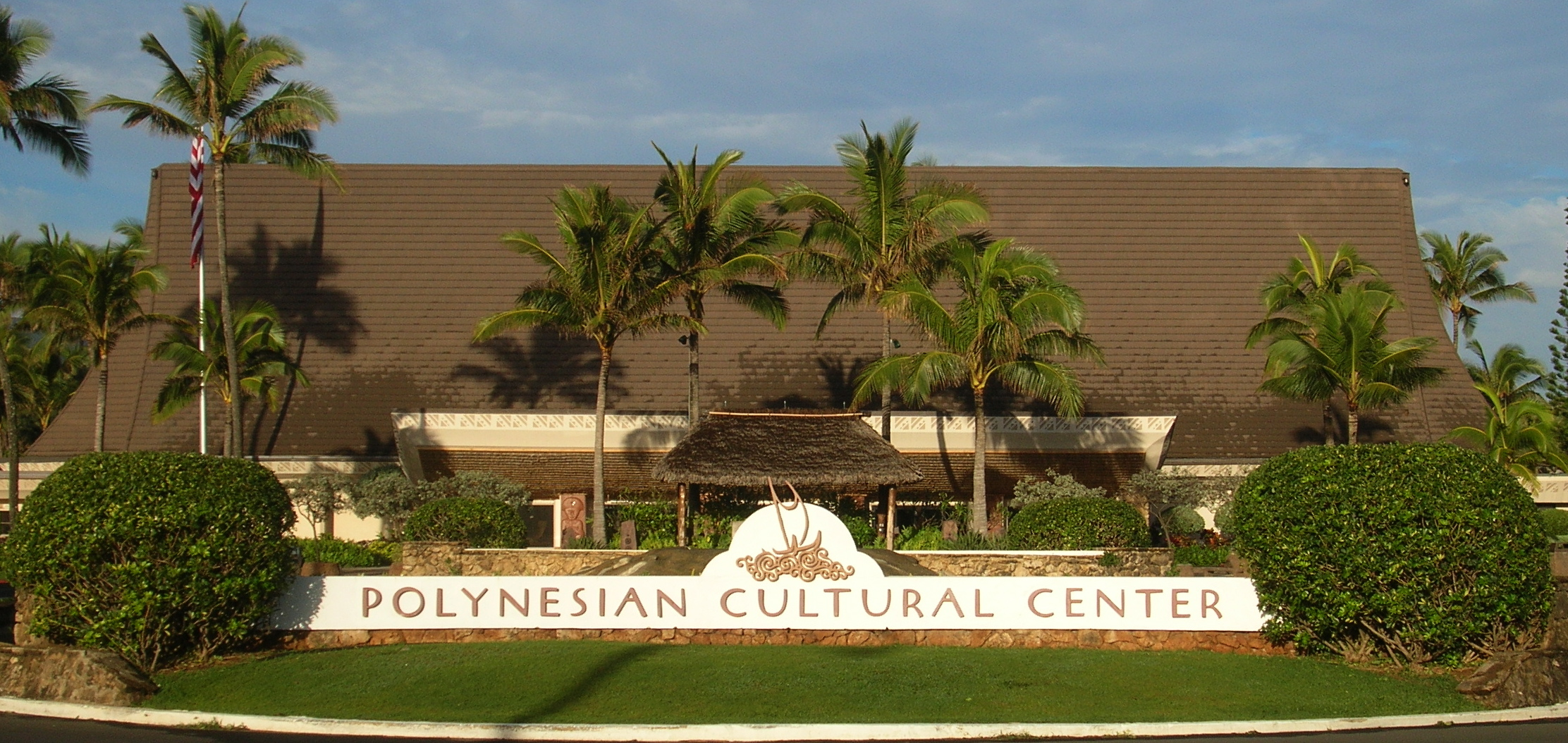
Entrance to the Polynesian Cultural Center, in Laie, Hawaii, home to one of the highest proportions of Samoan American residents.

In the 19th century, migration started from the Samoan Islands to the United States. A small group of Samoans were part of the first Mormon Polynesian colony in the US, which was founded in Utah in 1889 and consisted of Samoans, Hawaiian natives, Tahitians, and Maori people.

American Samoa officially became a US territory in 1900 with the Treaty of Cession of Tutuila and in 1904 with the Treaty of Cession of Manu'a.

In the 1920s a small group of Mormons from American Samoa emigrated to the modern United States. They were brought by American Mormons to Laie, Hawaii to assist in building the Mormon Temple of this place. The community grew over the decade and in 1929 there were already 125 American Samoans living in Laie, but the Samoan migration to Hawaii fell in the following years. It was probably due to the crash of 29, the loss of an important rice field for the community, and the Second World War. In the second half of the 1940s about 300 mostly military families of American Samoans emigrated to the United States specifically to Hawaii.

In 1951, nearly 1,000 American Samoans linked with the army (i.e. military personnel and their relatives) migrated to the Honolulu's American bases by accepting an invitation from the US Navy (which had left its bases in the Pago Pago city, as American Samoa began to be administered by the U.S. Department of the Interior) so that the Marines could continue working for the Navy. However, many of them later migrated to California (in 1952).

In 1952 the natives of American Samoa become U.S. nationals, although not American citizens, through the Immigration and Nationality Act of 1952. This encouraged Samoan emigration to the United States and during the rest of the decade nearly four thousand Samoans migrated to the US, mostly to California and Hawaii. Many more Samoans migrated to the United States in the 1960s, surpassing those who emigrated in the previous decade. In fact, the largest Samoan migration to the US occurred at this time (mainly at the beginning of the decade). After 1965 increased migration from Samoa republic. At this time, many Samoans serving in the US military emigrated to be stationed in Hawaii. In the 1970s over 7,540 Western Samoans emigrated to the United States, although the number of people from American Samoa who emigrated to the U.S. is unknown.

In 1972, the number of American Samoans living in the United States exceeded the Samoan population in American Samoa, and California took the place of Tutuila as the main Samoan-populated region. In 1980 over 22,000 Samoa-born lived in the U.S., mostly of Western Samoa (more than 13,200), while 9,300 were from American Samoa.

== Demographics ==
According to 2021 US Census Bureau estimates, there were 243,682 Samoan people in the United States stateside population, including those who have partial Samoan ancestry. The Samoan American community consists in Americans of both American Samoan and Western Samoan descent.

=== California ===
According to the 2021 U.S. Census, 63,000 people of Samoan origin reside in California, accounting for almost one-third of the Samoan population in the U.S. 0.2% of California's population is of Samoan descent. The number of those who identify as Samoan alone is 36,443. The percentages and numbers of Samoan people residing in cities listed below vary from 2015 to 2018, according to the "5-Year Estimates Detailed Tables" from the US Census Bureau.

==== Southern California ====
Several southern California counties have among the highest concentrations of Samoans in California, including those of partial ancestry, as follows: Carson (1.8-2.2%), Compton (0.3-0.5%), and Long Beach (0.7-0.8%), and Paramount (0.7-1%) in Los Angeles County, Oceanside (0.5-0.6%) in San Diego County, and Twentynine Palms (0.9-1.1%) in San Bernardino County.

Also in San Diego, one of the very first Samoan churches in the entire United States, was founded in 1955 by Rev. Suitonu Galea'i. From there, multiple Samoan churches throughout California branched from the First Samoan Congregational Christian Church of San Diego. There are Samoan communities enumerating several hundred in Moreno Valley (300 to 500) and San Bernardino (400), at least 0.2% of the city's populations.

==== Northern California ====
Much of San Francisco's Samoan community is tight-knit live amongst the city's African American community. The public housing communities as well as residential communities in the Bayview-Hunters Point, Potrero Hill, and Visitacion Valley neighborhoods in southeastern San Francisco are home to much of the city's Samoan community. As per the 2015-18 estimates, San Francisco is 0.2-0.3% Samoan (1,807-2,262 residents). The 2018 estimate of the number of Samoans in San Francisco is a decrease from the 2000 reported number of Samoans, which was 2,311 (which did not account for people who reported to be part Samoan). In the East Bay Area, San Leandro is home to a sizable Samoan community (0.4%-0.6%), as well as in Daly City (0.4-0.9%), East Palo Alto (1.2-1.3%), and Hayward (0.6%-0.9%). Balboa High School is about 3% Pacific Islander during the 2010s and 2020s and middle and elementary schools, such as Charles Drew Elementary in southeast San Francisco, are rife in Samoans and in general Pacific Islanders; that school of roughly 200 students is 15-25% Pacific Islander, and a similar volume of Islanders go to school at KIPP Bayview and Martin Luther King, Jr. Middle School.

In Daly City, Samoan restaurants and businesses are located off Geneva Avenue. In 1972, the First Samoan Congregational Church of San Jose was founded by Rev. Felix T. and Molly T. Ava Molifua, affiliated with Northern California UCC. San Jose has over 3,000 Samoans in residence (0.3%).

Another San Mateo County city, San Bruno, is about one percent Samoan; there are also Samoan communities in nearby South San Francisco and San Mateo proper, although it is more Tongan-populated within its Polynesian community.

In the Central Valley and inland California, where compared to the Bay Area has a slightly smaller percentage of Samoans, higher populations are commonly found in the areas of Modesto (0.2%), Sacramento, and Stockton. The city of Sacramento has over 1,800 to 2,200 Samoans, about 0.4% of its population.

In Central California, Samoan Americans are concentrated in Monterey County, which was home to a U.S. Army base, Fort Ord, which closed in 1994. The populations are concentrated in Marina (0.8-1%) and Seaside (0.4%-0.9%).

=== Other Western US ===
==== Oregon and Washington ====
The Seattle−Tacoma, Washington area is also home to a sizable Samoan community, especially in the cities of Kent (1.5%), Renton (1%), Federal Way (1.6%), SeaTac (2.9%), and White Center (3.2%). Seattle has 1,500 Samoans, 0.2% of the city's population. The First Samoan Christian Congregational Church in the Washington state was established in 1964 in southeast Seattle, where Samoans settled in the Pacific Northwest. The south Seattle neighborhoods of Columbia City and Rainier Valley have had sizeable Samoan communities since the 1960s and 1970s. Nearly 6,000 people of their descendants reside in Pierce County, Washington, making up 0.7% of the county's population. Tacoma is home to 1,800 Samoans, making up nearly one percent of the city's population.

The Dalles, Oregon has a Samoan community of nearly 200 Samoan people, making up 1.3% of the city's population. Portland, Oregon also has some Samoans, about 500, and Gresham has about the same with of a much smaller population of a city in general, therefore making half a percent of its population.

==== Utah and other Western US ====
Utah statewide is 0.6% Samoan including those with some non-Samoan ancestry, and 0.3% are those who identify as Samoan alone. Utah has a history of Samoan immigration dating back to the late 1800s, due to them taking up Mormonism which was preached and influenced to them by missionaries who had come to Polynesian islands. Utah's Mormon community had housing and services for some Polynesian immigrants, which also included Tongans and Maori. Salt Lake City, Utah is home to 1,500 Samoan-origin people, 0.7% of the city's population. Salt Lake County cities such as Kearns (2%), Taylorsville (1.5%), and West Valley City (1.8%) having above average proportions of Samoan people for Utah. There is a sizable Samoan community in Utah County, specifically Provo, which is at least 0.3% Samoan.

There is a Samoan community in Colorado Springs, Colorado of 430 people (0.1%), and Lawton, Oklahoma (0.3%), in which Comanche County, Oklahoma is at least 0.6% Pacific Islander (2010), mainly Samoan.

Las Vegas, Nevada is home to over 1,500 Samoans, 0.2% of the city's population.

=== Alaska and Hawaii ===
Outside the mainland US, many Samoan Americans have settled in Hawaii and Alaska. About 2.8% of Hawaiian residents are of Samoan descent, with 1.3% having full Samoan ancestry. Many live on the island of Oahu. Linapuni Street, especially the Kuhio Park Terrace apartments in Honolulu, has the highest concentration of Samoans of any residential area in Hawaii, at 37% of residents. Central Palolo has the highest percentage of any Hawaiian tract, with 4% having a Samoan background. The Oahu town of Laie has 1,380 Samoan Americans, about 21% of the town, one of the highest concentration of Samoan Americas of any town or city in the US.

Two percent of people in the city of Anchorage, Alaska are of Samoan descent, with nearly 6,000 living in the city. Alaska has a relatively high proportion of them, comprising about 0.8% of the state's population.

In recent years, the Samoan population has rapidly increased in Alaska. Barrow, Alaska and Whittier, Alaska both are abundant with Samoan residents and Samoan churches have become commonly attended in rural Alaska as well.

=== Midwest and South ===
In the Midwest, a significant Samoan community is in Independence, Missouri, where around 1,000 Samoan people reside (0.9% of the city). In nearby Kansas City, Missouri there lives 340 Samoans, which is 0.1% of the city's population.

In the Eastern United States and Southeastern United States, Samoan communities exist in Fayetteville, North Carolina and Clarksville, Tennessee. There are 365 Samoan-origin people in Prince William County, Virginia, and a Samoan church in Alexandria.

There is a community of Samoans in Liberty County, Georgia.

In Texas, there is a Samoan community prominent in the Dallas-Fort Worth suburb of Euless (0.5%), and a Samoan church in the city of Killeen (0.3%).

=== Military ===
Significant numbers of Samoan Americans serve in the US military. American Samoa has the highest rate of military enlistment of any state or territory.

== Sports ==
American football is the most popular sport in American Samoa. Per capita, the Samoan Islands have produced the highest number of National Football League players. In 2010, it was estimated that a boy born to Samoan parents is 56 times more likely to get into the NFL than any other boy in America.

== Notable people ==
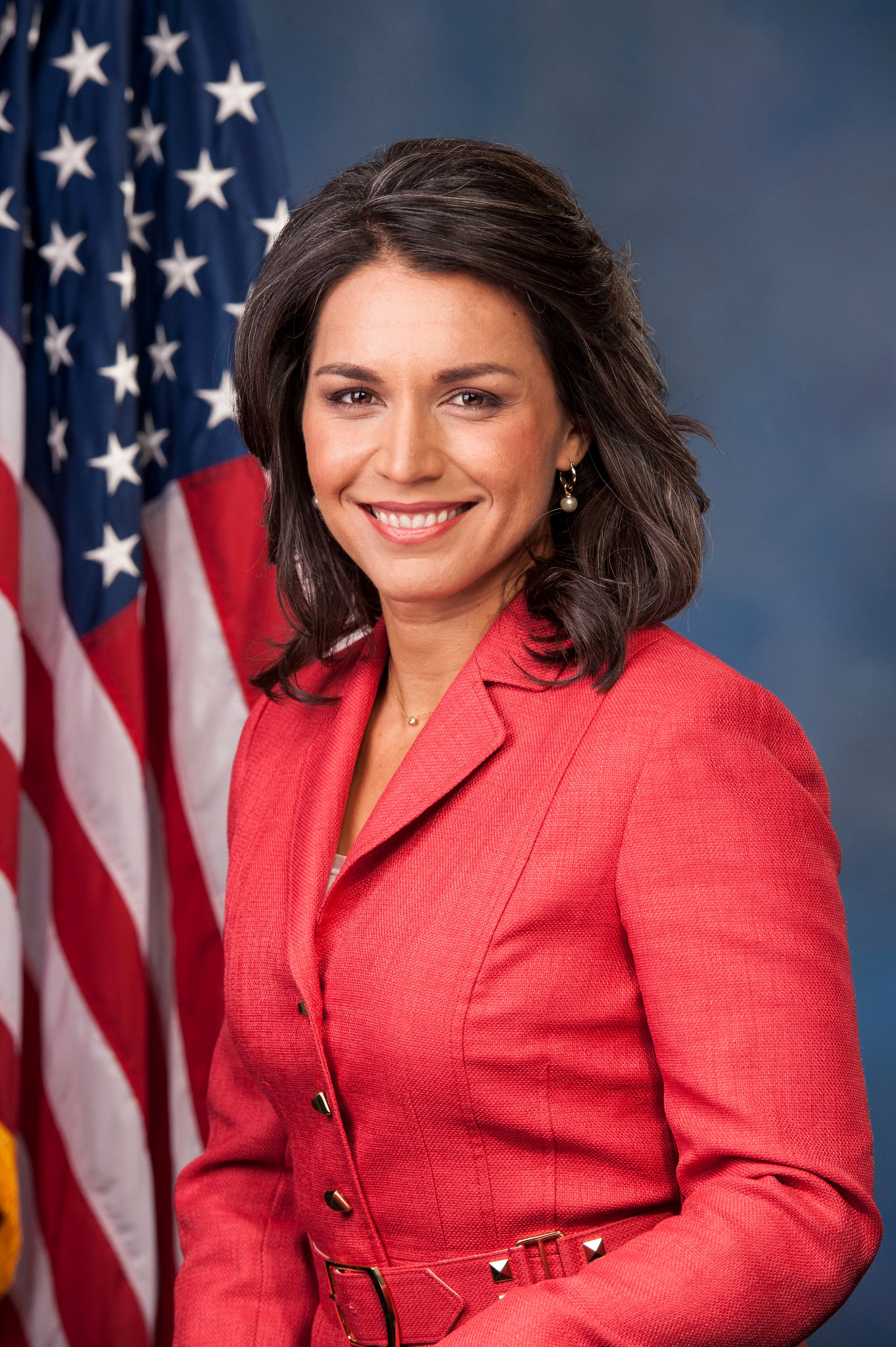
Tulsi Gabbard, Former US Representative for Hawaii's 2nd congressional district and 8th Director of National Intelligence. She is one-quarter Samoan.

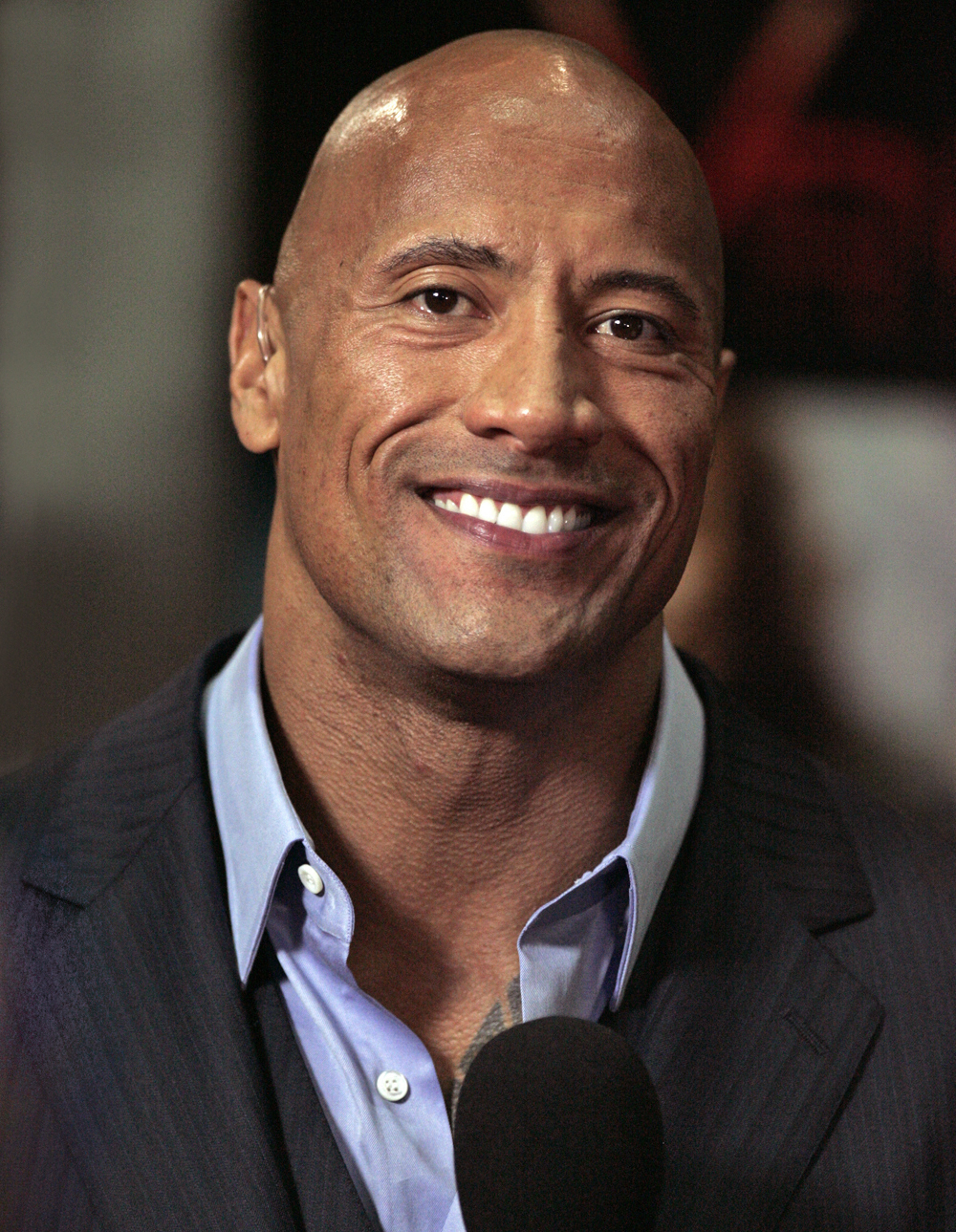
Dwayne "The Rock" Johnson, actor and wrestler. He is half Samoan.

=== Entertainment ===
- Drew Afualo, content creator, influencer, podcaster
- Queen Muhammad Ali, film director
- Cooper Andrews, actor
- Nephi Hannemann, actor
- Dwayne Johnson, actor, professional wrestler
- Mark Kanemura, dancer
- Tony Meredith, dancer, choreographer
- Josefa Moe, entertainer, celebrity
- Tanoai Reed, stunt performer, actor

=== Music ===
- Alex Aiono, singer, YouTuber
- Boo-Yaa T.R.I.B.E., hip hop group
- Drew Deezy, rapper
- Cheryl Deserée, singer-songwriter
- Dinah Jane, singer; member of Fifth Harmony
- Taimane Gardner, ukulele player, composer
- Maryanne Ito, soul singer
- Bunny Michael, musician, rapper
- Mavis Rivers, jazz singer
- Tedashii, Christian hip hop artist
- Tenelle, singer-songwriter

=== Politics, law and government ===
- William Coe, politician; acting Governor of Guam (1899)
- Jake Fitisemanu, politician; member of the Utah House of Representatives (2025-)
- Tulsi Gabbard, politician; Director of National Intelligence (2025-2026), US Representative for Hawaii's 2nd congressional district (2013–2021)
- Mike Gabbard, politician; member of the Hawaii State Senate (2006-)
- Verona Mauga, politician; member of the Utah House of Representatives (2025–)
- Mufi Hannemann, politician; 12th Mayor of Honolulu (2005–2010)
- Bode Uale, Hawaii state court judge

=== Sports ===
American football

- Al Afalava
- C. J. Ah You
- Harland Ah You
- Tui Alailefaleula
- Clifton Alapa
- Tyson Alualu
- Brad Anae
- Robert Anae
- Charlie Ane Jr.
- Charlie Ane III
- Donovan Arp
- Devin Asiasi
- Isaac Asiata
- Matt Asiata
- Sal Aunese
- Kahlil Bell
- Kendrick Bourne
- Inoke Breckterfield
- Algie Brown
- DeForest Buckner
- Colby Cameron
- Jordan Cameron
- Suʻa Cravens
- Scott Crichton
- Hershel Dennis
- Luther Elliss
- Justin Ena
- DeQuin Evans
- Nuʻu Faʻaola
- Jonathan Fanene
- Eletise Fiatoa
- Malcom Floyd
- Fou Fonoti
- Toniu Fonoti
- Chris Fuamatu-Maʻafala
- Setema Gali
- Randall Goforth
- Micah Hannemann
- Wayne Hunter
- Nate Ilaoa
- Junior Ioane
- Sale Isaia
- Senio Kelemete
- Pat Kesi
- Hauʻoli Kikaha
- Glen Kozlowski
- Mike Kozlowski
- Jake Kuresa
- Shawn Lauvao
- Kili Lefotu
- Sefo Liufau
- Joe Lobendahn
- Al Lolotai
- Malaefou MacKenzie
- Kaluka Maiava
- Damien Mama
- Frank Manumaleuga
- Brandon Manumaleuna
- Vince Manuwai
- Marcus Mariota
- Jeremiah Masoli
- Hercules Mataʻafa
- Fred Matua
- Rey Maualuga
- Josh Mauga
- Itula Mili
- Roy Miller
- Edwin Mulitalo
- Louis Murphy
- Kai Nacua
- Puka Nacua
- Jim Nicholson
- Ken Niumatalolo
- Al Noga
- Niko Noga
- Pete Noga
- Chris Owusu
- Tenny Palepoi
- Joe Paopao
- David Parry
- Saul Patu
- Domata Peko
- Kyle Peko
- Tupe Peko
- Ropati Pitoitua
- Kennedy Polamalu
- Troy Polamalu
- Pulu Poumele
- Jeremiah Poutasi
- Tavita Pritchard
- Mike Purcell
- Keilani Ricketts
- Jason Rivers
- Blaine Saipaia
- Dan Saleaumua
- Dru Samia
- Brashton Satele
- Samson Satele
- Brian Schwenke
- Kona Schwenke
- Ian Seau
- Junior Seau
- Mike Sellers
- Isaac Seumalo
- Danny Shelton
- Sealver Siliga
- Mana Silva
- JuJu Smith-Schuster
- Brian Soi
- Paul Soliai
- Vic Soʻoto
- Xavier Suʻa-Filo
- Nicky Sualua
- Frank Summers
- Alameda Taʻamu
- Ed Taʻamu
- Tua Tagovailoa
- Nuʻu Tafisi
- Kelly Talavou
- Lofa Tatupu
- Vai Taua
- Will Taʻufoʻou
- Junior Tautalatasi
- Terry Tautolo
- Sae Tautu
- J. R. Tavai
- Daniel Teʻo-Nesheim
- Manti Teʻo
- Martin Tevaseu
- Jack Thompson
- D. J. Tialavea
- John Timu
- Pisa Tinoisamoa
- Albert Toeaina
- Pago Togafau
- Levine Toilolo
- Mao Tosi
- Charles Tuaau
- Esera Tuaolo
- Natu Tuatagaloa
- Marques Tuiasosopo
- Peter Tuiasosopo
- Lavasier Tuinei
- Mark Tuinei
- Van Tuinei
- Joe Tuipala
- Willie Tuitama
- Maugaula Tuitele
- Andria Tupola
- Mike Ulufale
- Morris Unutoa
- Jeremiah Valoaga
- Lenny Vandermade
- Larry Warford
- Albert Wilson

Athletics

- Jeremy Dodson, sprints
- Gary Fanelli, long-distance
- Anthony Leiato, shot put

Baseball

- Benny Agbayani
- Chris Aguila
- Mike Fetters
- Isiah Kiner-Falefa
- Wes Littleton
- Sean Manaea
- Blake Sabol
- Tony Solaita
- Matt Tuiasosopo

Basketball

- Rashaun Broadus
- James Johnson
- Dion Prewster
- Wally Rank
- Peyton Siva
- Mekeli Wesley
- Wendell White

Mixed martial arts

- Andre Fili
- Kendall Grove
- Max Holloway
- Raquel Paʻaluhi

Professional wrestling

- Afa Anoaʻi
- Afa Anoaʻi Jr.
- Lloyd Anoaʻi
- Vanessa Borne
- Deuce
- Emily Dole
- Jacob Fatu
- Sam Fatu
- Nia Jax
- Dwayne Johnson
- Sean Maluta
- Roman Reigns
- Rikishi
- Rosey
- Samoa Joe
- Samu
- Solo Sikoa
- Tamina Snuka
- Umaga
- Jey Uso
- Jimmy Uso
- Yokozuna

Rugby

- Thretton Palamo, union
- Psalm Wooching, union

Swimming

- Virginia Farmer
- Stewart Glenister
- Robin Leamy

Other

- Robyn Ah Mow-Santos, volleyball
- Mariah Bullock, soccer
- Tony Finau, golf
- Konishiki Yasokichi, sumo
- Greg Louganis, diving
- Garrett Muagututia, volleyball
- Fua Logo Tavui, sailing

=== Other ===
- Matt Keikoan, poker player
- Alema Leota, politician and alleged criminal
- Caroline Sinavaiana-Gabbard, writer, literature professor
- Maluseu Doris Tulifau, human rights activist
- Sonny, friend often seen on “Dog The Bounty Hunter”

== See also ==
- Samoan Australians
- Samoan New Zealanders
- Samoa - United States relations
- Native Hawaiians
