= Marshallese Americans =

Marshallese American
Total population
- 52,624 alone or in any combination 47,300 alone (2020 Census)

Regions with significant populations
- Hawaii · Washington County, Arkansas · Benton County, Arkansas · Spokane, Washington · Orange County, California · Mercer County, Ohio · Enid, Oklahoma · Portland, Oregon

Languages
- Marshallese language · American English language

Religion
- Protestantism (Baptists)

Related ethnic groups
- Other American groups of Micronesian origin (Chamorro, Palauans, Micronesians)

Marshallese Americans are Americans of Marshallese descent or Marshallese people naturalized in the United States. According to the 2010 census, 22,434 people of Marshallese origin lived in the United States at that time, though that number has grown significantly over the last decade. A 2018 estimate put the number at approximately 30,000, while the 2020 census found a population of 47,300. The United States has the highest concentration of Marshallese people outside the Marshall Islands. Most of these Marshallese people live in Hawaii and Arkansas, with significant populations in Washington, California, Oklahoma and Oregon.

== History ==
In 1986, the Marshall Islands and the United States established an agreement called the Compact of Free Association, according to which the archipelago attained its full sovereignty. The treaty allows United States to provide defense, "social services and other benefits to the Marshall Islands" in exchange for military bases on the islands.

Under this treaty, Marshall Islanders can also travel and work in United States without having visas, although they must be legal permanent residents and go through the same naturalization process equal to that of all other nationalities. Because they have the legal right to travel and work in the U.S., few Marshallese immigrants seek or attain citizenship.

Immigration from the Marshall Islands to the United States first began in the 1980s. Additionally, when numerous layoffs occurred in the Marshall Islands in 2000, there was a second wave of migration of Marshallese to the U.S.

Most have emigrated to Hawaii and Arkansas when Tyson Foods, the largest poultry meat distributor in the world, employed numerous Marshallese people on the islands. Therefore, many Marshallese employees were transferred and relocated to Springdale, Arkansas, to the corporate headquarters of Tyson Foods. John Moody, the first Marshallese settler in Arkansas, came there in the 1980s.

Many Marshallese emigrate to the United States to give their children an education, while other Marshallese seek better working conditions or a better health system than the one found in their country.

Furthermore, since 1996 many Marshallese children have been adopted by American parents. Between 1996 and 1999, over 500 Marshallese children were adopted by American families. These adoptions are a result of social marginalization and economic poverty suffered by the population of the archipelago. Adoptions were further driven by unethical trafficking schemes for which some perpetrators are facing prosecution.

== Demography ==
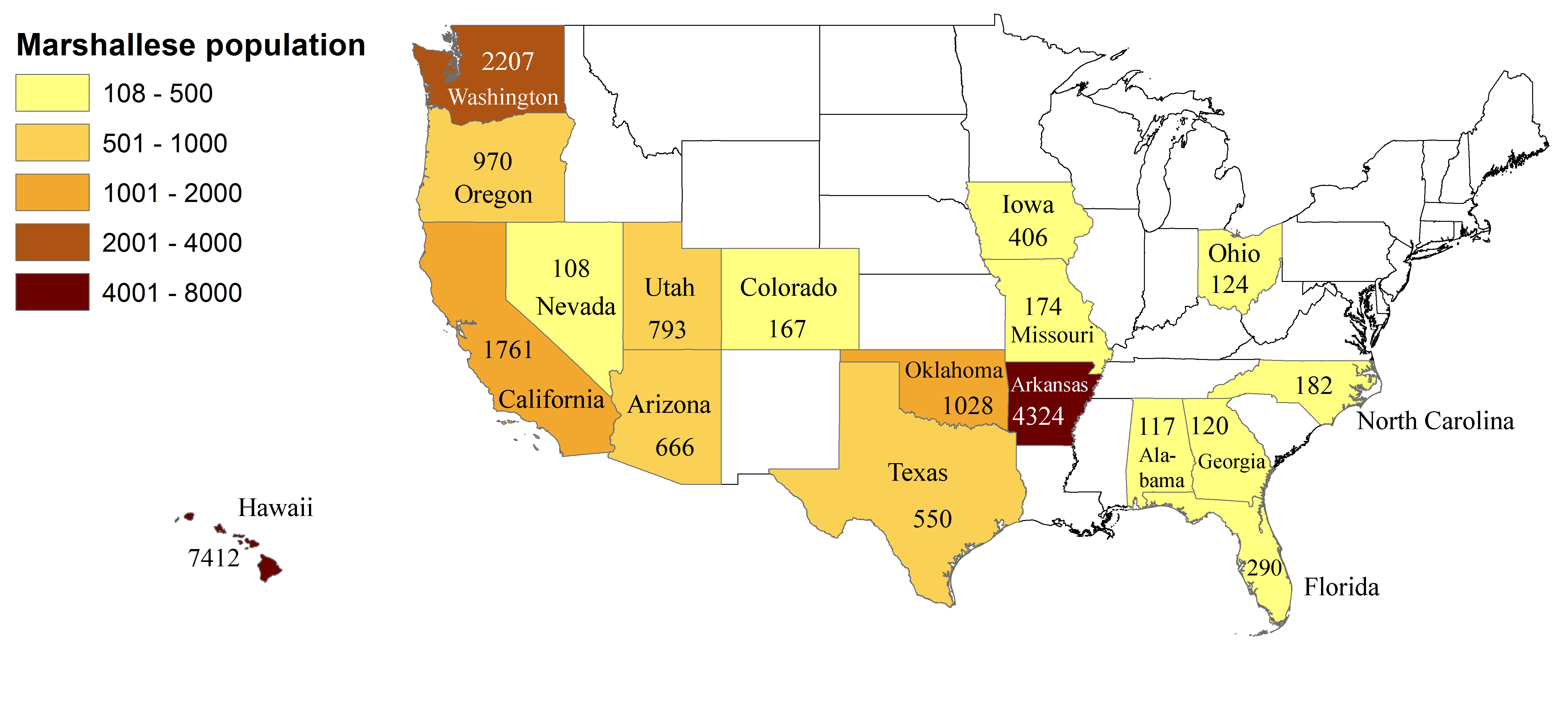
Number of Marshallese by US State, counted during the 2010 Population Census. White-shaded states had less than 100 Marshallese.

Most Marshallese Americans reside in Hawaii and Arkansas. In 2020 it is estimated that some 15,000 Marshallese call Arkansas home. Most reside in Washington County, mainly in Springdale, home of Tyson Foods where many of them work. The 2020 US Census found that were 8,677 living in Hawaii at the time.

Other significant Marshallese populations include Spokane (Washington) and Costa Mesa (California). According to Karen Morrison, director of Spokane's Odyssey World International, a nonprofit that provides services for immigrants, Spokane County is home of a community of 2,400 or 3,000 people of Marshallese origin. In 2006 Spokane-area schools had a lot of Marshallese students, so that "Spokane Public Schools has 370 students whose primary language is Marshallese"; these students form the second group, more numerous than the Spanish-speaking students (360 people) and following the Russian-speaking students (530 people) in these schools (in reference to non-English languages).

Several Marshallese immigrants coming to attend a seminary program in Dubuque, Iowa in the 1970s were the start of the city's Marshallese population. Circa 2024, the number of ethnic Marshallese in the Dubuque area numbered about 1,400.

The houses of the Marshallese of the USA house several generations of the same family and are sparsely furnished. In general terms, the population (which now has a western diet) has been adversely affected by diabetes, heart disease, tuberculosis, obesity, and COVID-19.

Many Marshallese are Baptist. The Marshallese Bible study group at Cross Church, a Baptist congregation in Springdale, has grown quickly in recent years, although the service is done mostly in English, since the church lacks ministers who speak fluent Marshallese.

Children born in the United States to Marshallese families have dual citizenship.

== Notable people ==
- Anju Jason, taekwondo practitioner
- Todd Lyght, American football player
- Haley Nemra, middle-distance runner
- Kathy Jetn̄il-Kijiner, poet and climate change activist

== United States Nuclear Testing ==
During the first 10 years of the Cold War, the United States detonated nearly seventy nuclear bombs in the Marshall Islands. The radiation from these bombs were covered by a concrete dome, Runit Dome, to protect the community from nuclear waste. Since being built, the interior of the dome has been leaking which has raised concerns for Marshallese locals. The effects of the nuclear testing resulted in destruction of entire islands, birth defects, and health problems of local residents, including cancer. Until recently, (2022), the United States has not offered services or apologies to the Marshallese community and has not aided in their recovery since 1986 when the first compact required the U.S. to place $150 million into a trust fund for nuclear-related claims.

Kathy Jetn̄il-Kijiner has written many poems to highlight this mistreatment of the Marshallese community. They filmed Rise, standing on Runit Dome and speaking about their community's struggles.

== See also ==
- Marshallese people in Springdale, Arkansas
- Arms Control Association
- Atomic Heritage Foundation
- The Progressive Magazine
