= Micronesian Americans =

Micronesian American
Total population
- 21,596 (2020 census estimate).

Regions with significant populations
- Pacific American Islands (Guam, Northern Mariana Islands and Hawaii), West Coast (Southern California and Portland, Oregon), Texas, Kansas City (Missouri) and Central Florida (in an area that extends from Orlando to Tampa and Clearwater)

Languages
- English · Chuukese · Pohnpeian · Yapese · Kosraean · Spanish

Religion
- Protestantism (minority) and Catholicism (majority)

Related ethnic groups
- English people · other American groups of Micronesian origin (Chamorro, Palauan, Marshallese)

Micronesian Americans are Americans who are descended from people of the Federated States of Micronesia, although the term may also include people descended from the US unincorporated territory of the Northern Mariana Islands. According to the 2020 US census, a total of 21,596 residents self-identified as having origins in the country, which consists of four states. More than half of these residents identified their origin as Chuuk State (12,464) with the rest as follows: 4,918 people from Pohnpei, 2,066 from Yap, and 2,148 people from Kosrae.

== History ==
Beginning in the early 1970s when the Pell Grant was extended, several hundred people from Micronesia (including both the Federated States of Micronesia and the other Micronesian island groups) emigrated yearly to the United States to attend college. By the late 1970s, many Micronesians were emigrating to Guam and the rest of the U.S. with the intention of establishing a permanent residence there. By 1980, several hundred people from the FSM were already residing in the U.S., with most of them being Outer Island Yapese. They did not want to return to their country and did not want to settle in Yap, where they lacked social status and where land was scarce.

In 1986, Micronesians obtained the right to live and work in the U.S. permanently, thanks to the Compact of Free Association covering the FSM, the Republic of the Marshall Islands (RMI), and the Republic of Palau. At first, the Micronesian emigrants to the U.S. under the compact were heavily Chuukese, with most of them settling in Guam and Saipan. When both of these islands experienced recession in the early 1990s, Micronesians increasingly headed for Hawaii. Micronesian migration to the U.S. increased significantly in the mid-1990s when compact funding for the FSM and the RMI decreased.

== Demography ==
In 2006, an article in the Micronesian Counselor estimated that over 30,000 Micronesian citizens were living in the United States, and that one in four Micronesians were living in the U.S. or its territories. However, in the 2010 U.S. census, only 8,185 U.S. residents said they were descended from the FSM. This number increased to 21,596 in the 2020 census.

About 1,200 people migrate yearly from the FSM to the U.S. to seek work and give their children a better education.

Most US Micronesians live in the Pacific American Islands (Guam, Northern Mariana Islands, and Hawaii). But many also live in southern California (such as San Diego or Pasadena), Portland, Oregon, Texas (Corsicana, mostly from Chuuk State), and Central Florida (where Micronesians, mostly Pohnpeians, are scattered across an area that extends from Orlando to Tampa and Clearwater). The Micronesian population is also increasing rapidly in the midwest state of Missouri, with Kansas City, Missouri, and Marshall, Missouri being home to quickly rising numbers of Micronesian-Americans, the majority of which being of Pohnpeian origin.

Another large concentration of Micronesians exists in southwest Missouri and northwest Arkansas. The Pohnpeian population (including outer islands which are part of the state of Pohnpei) in these areas has been estimated between 5,000 and 7,000. Evidence of the vast Pohnpeian population in this area can be seen at the yearly softball tournament held in Neosho, Missouri, which is also a sister city of Kolonia, Pohnpei. A few Marshallese also live in northwest Arkansas (numbered in the thousands). Small Micronesian communities also live in places such as Miami, Oklahoma, where there are Chuukese in the hundreds, and Morristown, Tennessee, with a rapidly growing population of over 1,000 as of 2020.

The Micronesians living in the United States have created networks to unite all Micronesian families living in the areas in which they live and give him their support. This occurs in many parts of the country. Being mostly Protestant, networks generally rely on churches, that often profess the Protestant religion. However, these facilitates place heavy emphasize on the sports and recreation of its members rather than religious teachings. The relationship between the Micronesians in these networks makes life easier in the United States. In addition to Protestants there is a minority of Catholic Micronesians in the U.S. So, according to the Chuuk Reform Movement website (a Chuuk chain, whose aimed at improving the life of this ethnic group in the United States), in May 2009 was ordained a priest of permanent way the Father Bruce Roby, in the Diocese of Bridgeport, Connecticut, being the first Catholic priest from the FSM on permanent assignment in the United States.

== Organizations ==
Many Micronesians live in southern California, where they have, at least, an association: The Micronesian Association of Southern California (Mascal), located in San Diego, to foster the relationship between the Micronesians residing in the United States. Furthermore, the association promotes educational opportunities, "career development" and establish some programs designed for promote the social awareness and services for its members.

== Notable people ==
- Keitani Graham, Greco-Roman wrestler
- Emelihter Kihleng, poet
