= Melila Purcell =

American football player (born 1984)

Profile
- Position: Defensive end

Personal information
- Born: February 5, 1984 (age 42); Pago Pago, American Samoa
- Listed height: 6 ft 5 in (1.96 m)
- Listed weight: 295 lb (134 kg)

Career information
- High school: Leone (Leone, American Samoa)
- College: Hawaii
- NFL draft: 2007: 6th round, 200th overall pick

Career history
- Cleveland Browns (2007–2008); Spokane Shock (2011)

Awards and highlights
- First-team All-WAC (2006); Second-team All-WAC (2005)
- Stats at ArenaFan.com

Melila Purcell III (born February 5, 1984) is an American Samoan former football defensive end. He played college football for the Hawaii Rainbow Warriors and was selected by the Cleveland Browns in the sixth round of the 2007 NFL draft.

== Early life ==
Melila Purcell III was born on February 5, 1984, in Pago Pago, American Samoa. He participated in high school football, basketball, volleyball, and track at Leone High School in Leone, American Samoa. He played defensive end, wide receiver, and tight end on the football team, earning Samoan International first-team all-star honors. Purcell was a high jumper and long jumper in track and garnered all-star recognition in basketball. He graduated from Leone High in 2002, and was considered the best athlete from American Samoa in the class of 2002.

== College career ==
Purcell enrolled at the University of Hawaiʻi at Mānoa to play college football for the Rainbow Warriors. He had to sit out the 2002 season in order to meet residency requirements. He played in 11 games, starting one, at defensive end in 2003, posting 23 solo tackles, 17 assisted tackles, and 3.5 sacks while missing three games due to a dislocated elbow. In August 2004, Hawaii head coach June Jones called Purcell the team's "best defensive lineman". He appeared in all 13 games, starting 12, as a sophomore in 2004, recording 47 solo tackles, 27 assisted tackles, six sacks, four pass breakups, two blocked extra point attempts, and one forced fumble that was returned by Hawaii for a touchdown. He was named honorable mention all-Western Athletic Conference (WAC) for his performance during the 2004 season.

Purcell played in ten games, starting eight, in 2005, totaling 21 solo tackles, 13 assisted tackles, and two fumble recoveries while missing time due to a sprained knee and another elbow injury. Purcell was named second-team all-WAC and the team's most inspirational player for the 2005 season. He started all 14 games as a senior in 2006, recording 36 solo tackles, 24 assisted tackles, 9.5 sacks, and four forced fumbles while garnering first-team all-WAC recognition. He finished his college career with 208 tackles and 19 sacks.

In 2006, Purcell was named WAC Defensive Player of the Week twice.

== Professional career ==
=== Cleveland Browns ===
Purcell was selected by the Cleveland Browns in the sixth round, with the 200th overall pick, of the 2007 NFL draft. He did not expect to be drafted. Instead of watching the draft, he went out for breakfast with his family. Purcell signed with the Browns on July 23. He was released on September 1 and signed to the practice squad on September 3. On December 26, Purcell was promoted to the active roster for the season finale against the San Francisco 49ers on December 26, 2007. He did not play in the game.

Purcell was released on August 30, 2008, and signed to the practice squad again on September 3. He became a free agent after the season, signing a reserve/future contract with the Browns on December 30, 2008. He was released for the final time on August 24, 2009.

=== Spokane Shock ===
On July 14, 2011, Purcell was assigned to the Spokane Shock of the Arena Football League (AFL). He posted one solo tackle and one assisted tackle while with the Shock. He was placed on reassignment on August 15, 2011.

== Personal life ==
Purcell is the cousin of former Canadian Football League player Alvis Satele. Three other cousins, Samson, Brashton, and Hercules Satele, were teammates with Purcell on the Rainbow Warriors. He also played with his brother, Amani Purcell, at Hawaii.
