= Albert Toeaina =

American gridiron football player (born 1984)

No. 72
- Position: Offensive tackle

Personal information
- Born: June 26, 1984 (age 42); San Francisco, California, U.S.
- Listed height: 6 ft 5 in (1.96 m)
- Listed weight: 335 lb (152 kg)

Career information
- High school: Pittsburg (Pittsburg, California)
- College: Tennessee
- NFL draft: 2006: undrafted

Career history
- Carolina Panthers (2006)*; Oakland Raiders (2007)*; Hamilton Tiger-Cats (2009); Las Vegas Locomotives (2010–2012)
- * Offseason or practice squad member only

Awards and highlights
- UFL champion (2010)

Albert Jesse Toeaina (born June 26, 1984) is an American former professional football offensive tackle He was signed by the Carolina Panthers as an undrafted free agent in 2006. He played college football at Tennessee.

Toeaina was born in San Francisco to a Samoan American family. Growing up in Antioch, California, Toeiana graduated from Pittsburg High School. He began his college football career at the City College of San Francisco before transferring to the University of Tennessee.

He was also a member of the Oakland Raiders, Hamilton Tiger-Cats, and Las Vegas Locomotives.
