= Oceanian Americans =

People of Oceanian descent in the United States

Total population
- 1,338,219; 0.4% of the total U.S. population (2010)

Regions with significant populations
- California, Hawaii, New York, Illinois, Wisconsin, Guam, American Samoa, Oregon, Nevada, Utah, Texas, Florida and Washington

Languages
- American English, Carolinian, Chamorro, Fijian, Hawaiian, Marshallese, Samoan, Tongan, Polynesian languages, other Oceanic languages

Religion
- Predominantly Christianity

Related ethnic groups
- Australians, New Zealanders, Pacific Islanders

Oceanian Americans or Oceanic Americans are Americans whose ancestors came from Oceania, a region which is composed of the Australian continent and the Pacific Islands.

There are basically two Oceanian American groups, that well represent the racial and cultural population of Oceania: Euro-Oceanian Americans (Australian Americans and New Zealand Americans) and the indigenous peoples of Oceania in the United States or Pacific Islander Americans (Chamorro Americans, Samoan Americans, etc.) Most of the Euro-Oceanians are descended from the European settlers in Oceania; while Pacific Islanders are of indigenous Oceanian descent.

== Oceanian Americans in the 2000 and 2010 United States censuses ==
Oceanian Americans in the 2000 and 2010 U.S. censuses:

Ancestry	2000	2000 % of Oceanian American population	2010	2010 % of Oceanian American population
Pacific Islander American (except Australia and New Zealand)	874,414	90.18%	1,225,195	91.55%
Australian American	78,544	8.10%	93,063	6.95%
New Zealand American	16,628	1.71%	19,961	1.49%
TOTAL	969,586	100.0%	1,338,219	100.0%
