= Brashton Satele =

American football player (born 1987)

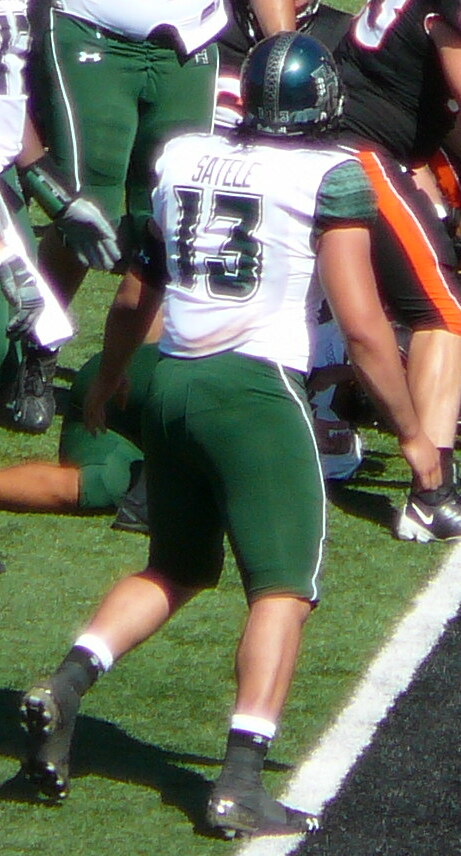
- Satele with the Hawaii Warriors in 2008

No. 48
- Position: Linebacker

Personal information
- Born: November 8, 1987 (age 39); Mililani, Hawaii
- Listed height: 6 ft 0 in (1.83 m)
- Listed weight: 248 lb (112 kg)

Career information
- High school: Honolulu (HI) Word of Life
- College: Hawaii
- NFL draft: 2010: undrafted

Career history
- New York Jets (2010−2011)*; Dallas Cowboys (2012–2013)*
- * Offseason or practice squad member only
- Stats at Pro Football Reference

Brashton Satele (born November 8, 1987) is an American former football linebacker. He was signed as an undrafted free agent by the New York Jets in 2010. He played college football at Hawaii.

== College career ==
Upon completing his high school career, Satele decided to attend his family's alma mater, the University of Hawaii, instead of Oregon State, Utah and Notre Dame. During his first year at Hawaii, in 2005, Satele sat out for the season. The following year, Satele played in nine games for the Warriors as a linebacker and as a special teamer. In 2007, Satele played in twelve games mostly on the special teams unit.

Satele performed in all fourteen games for the Warriors in 2008 as the middle linebacker. Satele recorded a career high 53 tackles, with six for a loss, a sack, an interception, one forced fumble and five passes defensed.

In August 2009, Satele suffered a left shoulder injury while attempting to make a tackle during a team practice. The injury, a torn labrum, required surgery that prematurely ended his 2009 campaign. Satele submitted a medical exemption application to the NCAA in order to attempt a comeback with the Warriors in 2010 however, the application was denied as the NCAA determined that Satele did not have the proper documentation to prove he redshirted the 2005 season due to injury. Following the ruling, Satele was made eligible to enter the NFL.

== Professional career ==
=== Pre-draft ===
Pre-draft measurables
Height	Weight	40-yard dash	10-yard split	20-yard split	20-yard shuttle	Three-cone drill	Vertical jump	Broad jump
6 ft 0 in (1.83 m)	241 lb (109 kg)	4.62 s	1.57 s	2.72 s	4.10 s	6.86 s	32 in (0.81 m)	9 ft 6 in (2.90 m)
Results taken from Pro Day workout.

=== New York Jets ===
After going undrafted, Satele reached an agreement with the Oakland Raiders on a free agent contract. Though Satele signed the contract, two days prior to having to report to mini-camp, Satele learned that the Raiders failed to "execute the contract" after receiving his signature thus, allowing him to try out with another NFL team.

Satele was invited to participate during the New York Jets' rookie mini-camp, where he performed well. On May 2, Satele agreed to a three-year contract with the team. After suffering an ankle injury through training camp and the preseason, Satele was released by the team during the final roster cuts on September 4, 2010. His attempts to make the team were documented on Hard Knocks.

Satele was signed to the practice squad on December 8, 2010. Following the season, Satele signed a future contract on January 25, 2011. He was waived on September 2.

=== Dallas Cowboys ===
Satele signed a reserve/future contract with the Dallas Cowboys on January 12, 2012. Satele was released by Dallas on May 7. Satele was re-signed to the team's practice squad later in the season on December 12, 2012.

== Personal ==
Satele was born to former San Diego Chargers linebacker, Alvis Satele and his mother, Lee Ann. Satele has four other siblings, a sister and three brothers. Satele is the cousin of former Miami Dolphins center Samson Satele, former Cleveland Browns defensive end Melila Purcell and former Arizona Cardinals guard Hercules Satele.
