= Australian Americans =

Ethnic group

Total population
- 60,965 (by birth 2000 United States census data); 101,036 (by ancestry)

Regions with significant populations
- West Coast (especially in California near the San Francisco and Sacramento area), Midwest, New England, Florida, Hawaii and Texas

Languages
- American English, Australian English

Related ethnic groups
- British Americans · Cornish Americans · Canadian Americans · English Americans · Scottish Americans · Scotch-Irish Americans · Welsh Americans · Irish Americans • New Zealand Americans • Oceanian Americans • White Americans • Asian Americans

Australian Americans are Americans who have Australian ancestry. The first Australian Americans were settlers in Australia who then moved on to America. This group included English, Irish, Welsh and Scottish settlers in Australia who then moved to California during the Gold Rush. Immigration from Australia to the United States increased at times of economic boom, such as the Reconstruction era, and in the years following the Second World War. Many Australian citizens live in the U.S. during the 21st century, including an estimated 44,000 Australians living in the city of Los Angeles alone as of 2016. In 2023 Australian Americans had the highest median household income out of any ancestry group as well as a high per capita income of $66,769.

== History ==
The history of the Australian American population almost follows the story of both British Americans and Irish Americans, as Australia was a British political territory at the time when they first immigrated and most of the settlers were English or Irish. The first wave of immigration from Australia to the United States came in the 1850s California Gold Rush when mostly Irish migrants who had escaped the Great Irish Famine had previously worked on the Australian goldfields. In San Francisco, the "Sydney Ducks" as they were known came into violent conflict with nativist locals.

Transpacific immigration then dried up while the American Civil War took place. It picked up during the period of Reconstruction, but faltered again when Australia was hit by an economic depression in the late 1890s. Immigration to the United States peaked in the years following World War II, due to America's increased economic activity, and the exodus of 15,000 Australian war brides who married U.S. servicemen. From 1971 to 1990, more than 86,400 Australians and New Zealanders immigrated to the United States.

== Population ==
At the 2000 U.S. Census, 60,965 Australian-born people were enumerated in the United States, of which 15,315 were citizens. Around 40% of Australian Americans had entered the United States before 1980. Since 2010, a Little Australia has emerged and is growing in Nolita, Manhattan, New York City. In 2016, the Australian Consulate-General estimated there were 44,000 Australians living in Los Angeles.

== See also ==
- American Australians
- Australia–United States relations
- Foreign Account Tax Compliance Act
