= Niuean =

Niuean pertains to anything of, from or related to Niue, an island nation located in the South Pacific Ocean.

- A person from Niue, or of Niuean descent. (See Demographics of Niue)
- The Niuean language
- Niuean cuisine
