= Tongan Americans =

Americans of Tongan origin or descent

Total population
- 48,536 alone, 0.01% of US population 78,871 including partial ancestry, 0.02% (2020 census)

Regions with significant populations
- American Samoa, New York, Massachusetts, Pennsylvania, Alaska (Anchorage), Arizona (Phoenix, Mesa), Minnesota, Missouri, Washington, Colorado, California (Oakland, Sacramento County, San Mateo County, Los Angeles County, Monterey County, San Diego County), Hawaii (O'ahu), Nevada (Las Vegas, Reno), Texas (Euless), Utah (Salt Lake County, Utah County)

Languages
- American English, Tongan

Religion
- Christianity, Polytheism, Mormonism

Related ethnic groups
- Other Polynesians and Samoan Americans.

Tongan Americans are Americans who can trace their ancestry to Tonga, officially known as the Kingdom of Tonga. There are approximately 57,000 Tongan Americans living in the United States, as of 2012. Tongans are considered to be Pacific Islanders in the United States census, and are the country's fourth largest Pacific Islander American group in terms of population, after Native Hawaiians, Samoan Americans, and Guamanian/Chamorro Americans.

There are 78,871 people of Tongan descent living in the US, including those of partial ancestry, as per the 2020 US census.

People of Tongan descent are often found in clusters in the metropolitan areas of Dallas, Texas, California's San Francisco Bay Area, Phoenix, Arizona, Hawaii, and the Salt Lake Valley of Utah.

== History ==
Tongans have immigrated to the United States or its territories since 1916, when some people of this island immigrated to Laie, a census-designated place in Hawaii, which was then an American territory but not yet a state. Later, in 1924 and 1936 two more Tongans immigrated to the United States, specifically to Utah, with an American Mormon who served as a missionary in Tonga (although the first of them only accompanied the Mormon, since he only migrated to the US to study there), while in 1956 the first Tongan family living in the United States was settled in Salt Lake City. However, it was not until the end of World War II when many more Tongans immigrated to the United States. Most of them were missionaries, who immigrated to the United States to work in several religious and cultural centers. Many other Tongans immigrated to the United States in the 1950s. Since then, the number of Tongans to immigrate to the US increased each decade: In the 1960s 110 more Tongans immigrated to the US and in the 1970s 940 more immigrated. The number was especially notable in the 1980s and 1990s. In the last decade, over 1,900 Tongans have immigrated to the United States due to limited land availability and a scarcity of jobs in their home country. By 1980, 6,200 people of this origin were living in the US, and by in 1990 that number had increased to 17,600. By 2000, there were 31,891 people of Tongan origin living in the United States.

== Demographics ==
Tongan immigration has been influenced by the Church of Jesus Christ of Latter-day Saints (LDS Church), who help them obtain visas (both studies and work) and employment.

=== California ===
California has 26,000 Tongan Americans including those of mixed ethnicity, comprising 0.06% of the state's population. About 19,000 were Tongan alone: 0.05%. The San Francisco Bay Area has the largest Tongan population in California and is among the largest nationwide, with an estimated population of 5,000 in San Mateo County alone (0.6%), concentrated especially in the city of East Palo Alto (8.3%). Within San Mateo County, the city of San Mateo (1.2%), San Bruno, and South San Francisco have sizable Tongan populations. Other Bay Area cities with significant Tongan populations include the East Bay cities of Oakland (0.3% Tongan), especially in the San Antonio area. San Leandro, Concord, and Pittsburg. Smaller communities can be found in Santa Clara County, mainly in Mountain View. There are around 1,000 Tongans in Sacramento and more throughout the Sacramento Valley.

Other cities with significant but small Tongan American communities exist within Southern California. The Greater Los Angeles Area city of Inglewood (0.4% or less), Hawthorne (0.4% or less), and the Inland Empire sub-region. Long Beach, California is home to 600 Tongans, 0.1% of the city's population. In the city of Los Angeles itself, there are about 1,000 Tongans or part-Tongan people, less than 0.05% of LA's population. There are two Tongan churches in South Los Angeles, within the Vermont Vista area, where the schools are roughly 1-2% Pacific Islander, which may mainly consist of Samoans and Tongans. There is also a Tongan church in Pomona.

San Diego County has several hundred Tongans.

=== Utah ===
The state of Utah has a large presence of Tongan Americans, and a significant Pacific Islander population in general. There are over 18,330 Tongan Americans in Utah, including those of mixed ethnicity, making up 0.6% of the state population. As of 2011, Utah has around 30 branches of Tongan Latter-day Saint churches. Salt Lake County is home to 12,859 people of Tongan descent. At least 2,000 people of Tongan descent live in Salt Lake City alone, making up one percent of the city's population. West Valley City has 3,200 Tongans, making 2.4% of the city's population.

=== Other states ===
Euless, Texas, in the Dallas-Fort Worth metropolitan area, has a sizable Tongan community. At least ten Tongan churches are present in Euless. Trinity High School is also well known in the local area for their tradition of beginning Friday night football games with the culture's traditional war cry, the Kailao. As of 2020, Euless is about 2% Pacific Islander, and home to over 500 Tongans, almost 1% of the city. Bedford, Texas also has several hundred Tongan residents.

There are 500 people of Tongan descent living in Portland, Oregon (0.1% of the city's population). There are over 1,000 Tongans in the Seattle metropolitan area, mainly in the White Center area, which is at least 2% Tongan.

Anchorage, Alaska (0.3%); Kona, Hawaii; Lahaina, Hawaii, and Reno, Nevada. Hawaii has the largest percentage or second highest, after Utah, of Tongan Americans, with 8,496 people of Tongan descent, making up 0.6% of Hawaiian residents. There are 1,000 Tongans in Honolulu, 0.3% of the city.

The Phoenix, Arizona metropolitan area, especially within the cities of Phoenix proper and Mesa are home to growing Tongan populations, as well as pan-Polynesian stores and churches. There are 1,500 Arizonan Tongans according to Zipatlas, in which this number was given during the 2010s.

American Samoa also is 2% Tongan.

== Notable people ==
- Professional golfer Tony Finau
- NFL player Haloti Ngata
- BYU Head Football Coach Kalani Sitake
- Singer Dinah Jane
- NFL player Vita Vea
- Musical group The Jets
- NFL player, television news reporter Vai Sikahema
- California state assemblyman David Tangipa
- Retired professional wrestler Haku
- NFL player Khalil Shakir

== See also ==
- Tongan Australians
- Tongan New Zealanders
- Tonga–United States relations
