= New Zealand Americans =

Ethnic group

Total population
- 19,961 (2010 American Community Survey)

Regions with significant populations
- Illinois, Wisconsin, California, and Washington

Languages
- American English, New Zealand English, Māori, Spanish

Related ethnic groups
- Australian Americans · Oceanian Americans

New Zealand Americans are Americans who have New Zealand ancestry. According to the 2010 surveys, there are 19,961 New Zealand Americans. Most of them are of European descent, but some hundreds are of indigenous New Zealand descent. Some 925 of those New Zealand-Americans declared they were of Tokelauan origin. The 2000 Census indicated also the existence of 1,994 people of Māori descent in US.

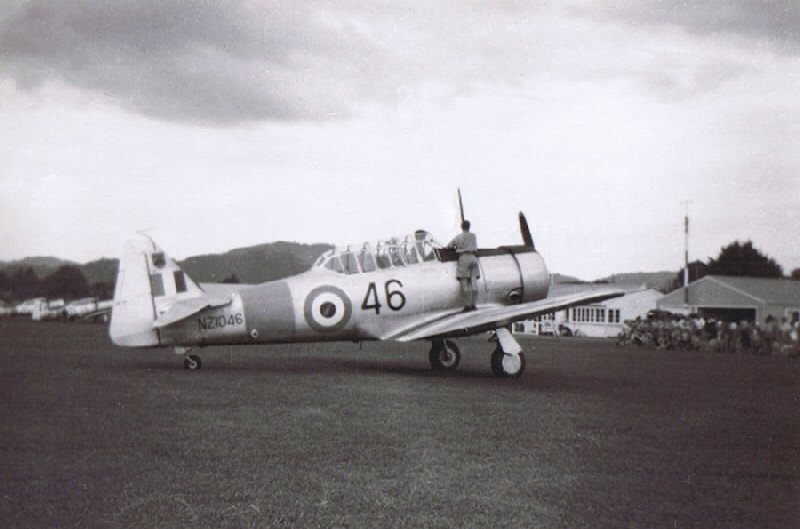
Taking flight to North American Harvard at Onerahi Aerodrome, New Zealand 1961.

== History ==
The earliest instance of Many New Zealanders coming to the United States happened during the California Gold Rush in which some went to the state of California to make their fortune and stayed there. The modern stream of New Zealanders immigrating to America came after World War II as a significant portion (although not the majority) of these immigrants were war brides, because they had married U.S. servicemen who were stationed in the Pacific theater during the war. Since the 1940s, the majority of New Zealanders who have settled in the United States came seeking higher education or employment, especially in work related to finance, import and export, and entertainment industries.

Some small communities of New Zealanders have been created in the Chicago area and in the Green Bay and Madison, Wisconsin areas.

== Notable people ==
- Alex Aiono, singer, producer (New Zealander father)
- Peter Arnett, TV presenter (Originally from Riverton, New Zealand)
- Kerry Bishé, actress (Originally from New Zealand)
- Ray Comfort, fundamentalist Christian evangelist
- Kimberley Crossman, actress and comedian
- Julian Dobbs, Anglican bishop
- Jake Fitisemanu, Utah state representative
- Rachel Hunter, model, actress
- Phil Keoghan, host of The Amazing Race
- Chris Liddell, former White House Deputy Chief of Staff
- Sam Wills, comedian
- Stefania LaVie Owen, actress
- Sean Marks, retired basketball player and NBA executive
- Leo T. McCarthy, former lieutenant governor of California, Speaker of the California State Assembly, and San Francisco supervisor
- William Hayward Pickering, NASA chief
- Clive Revill, character actor
- George Silk, photojournalist
- Peter Snell, athlete
- Jeremy Waldron, university professor
- Martin Henderson, actor
- Sarah Robb O'Hagan, former president of Gatorade and Equinox
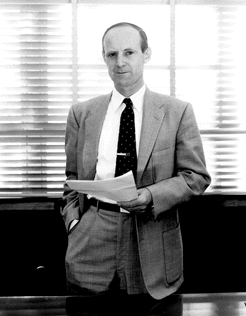
William Hayward Pickering

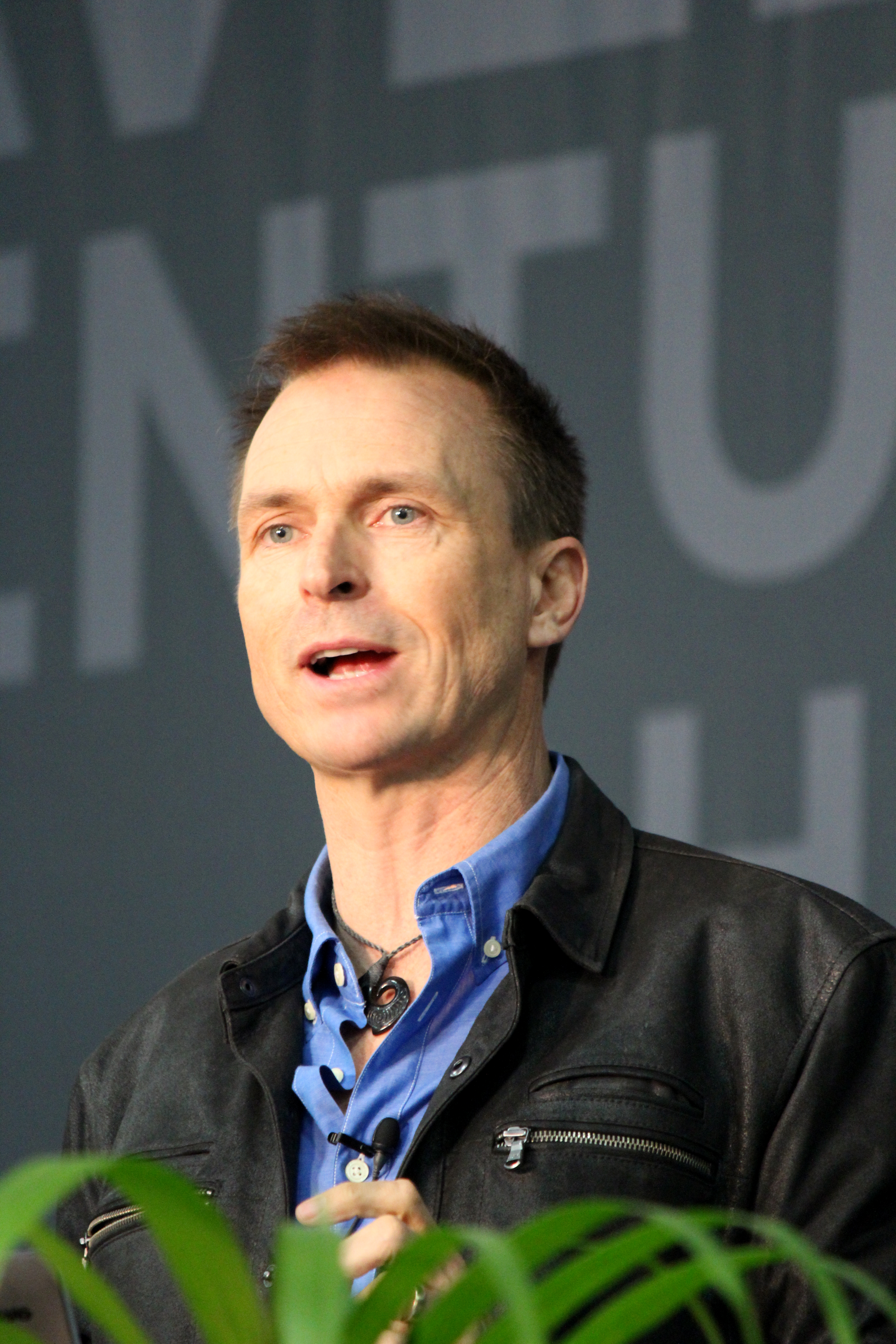
Phil Keoghan

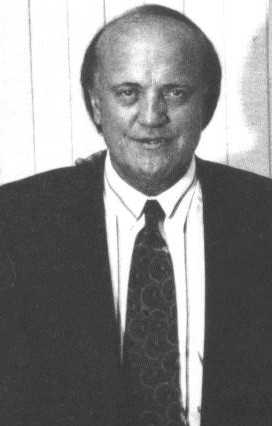
Peter Arnett

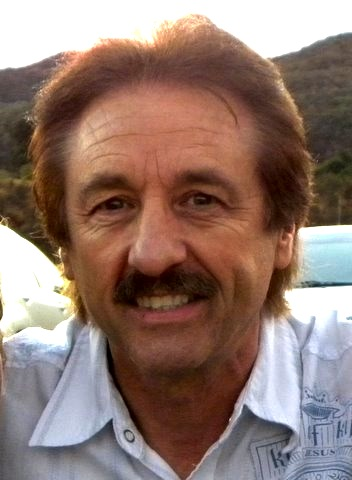
Ray Comfort

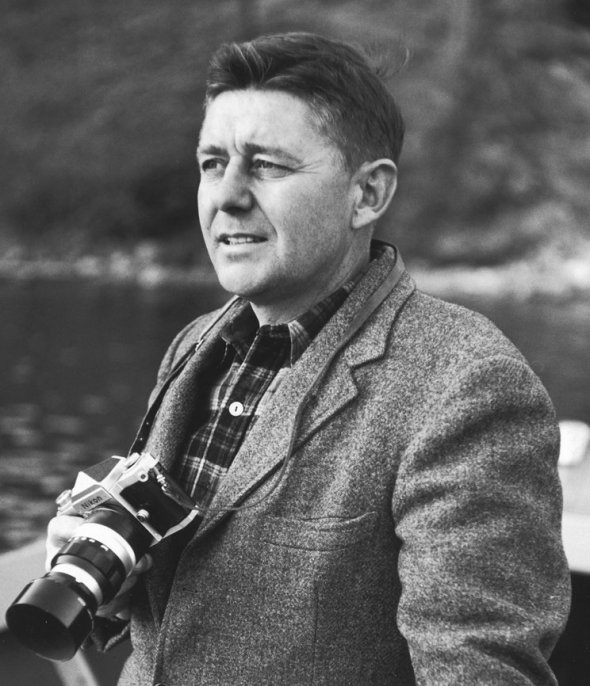
George Silk

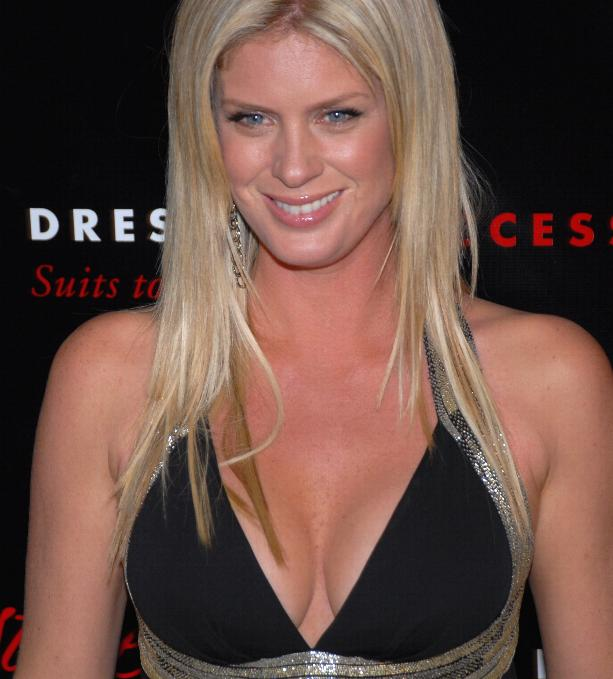
Rachel Hunter

== See also ==
- Māori Americans
- American New Zealanders (for New Zealanders born in the United States or of American descent)
