= Samson Satele =

American football player (born 1984)

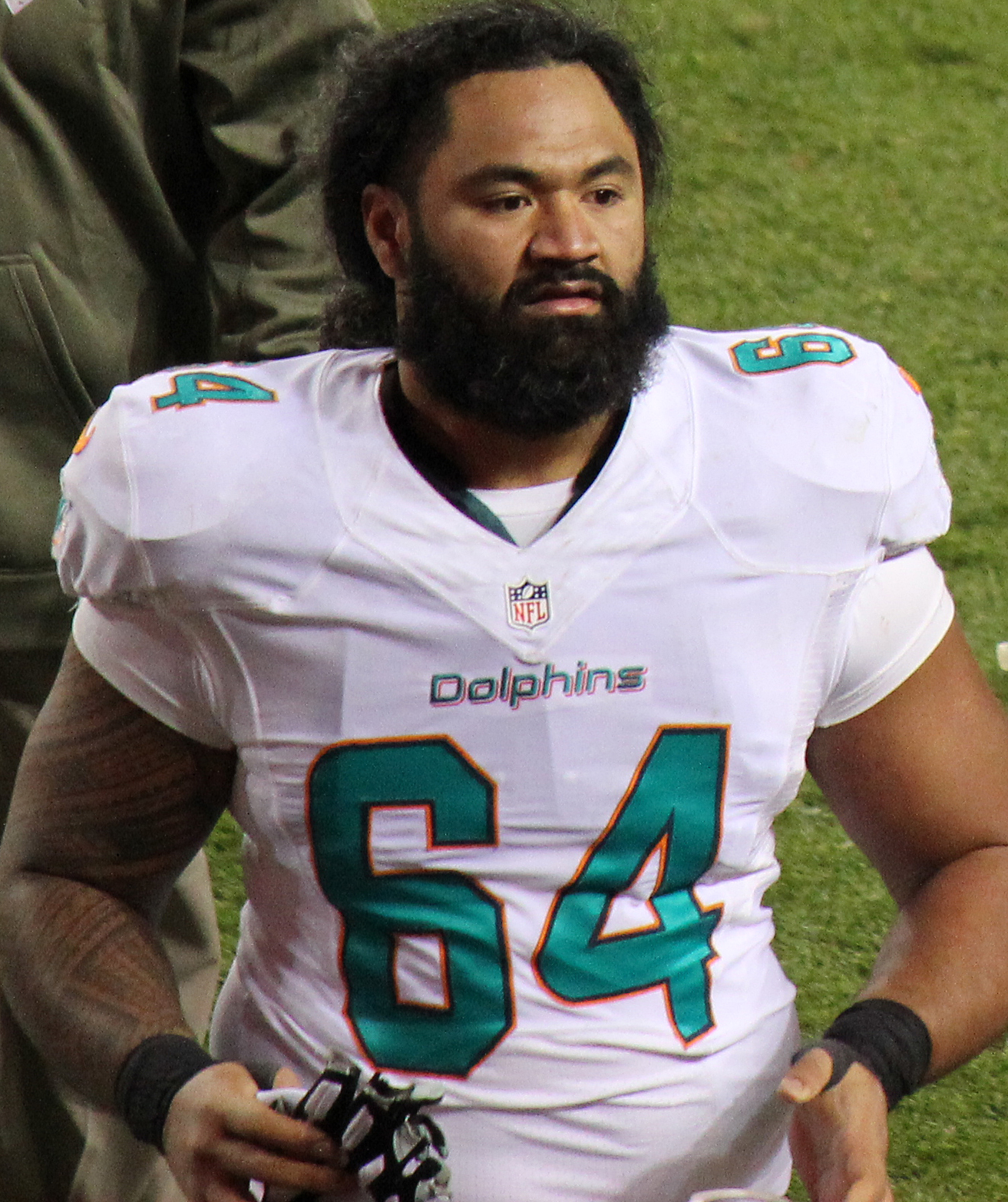
- Satele with the Miami Dolphins in 2014

No. 64
- Position: Center

Personal information
- Born: November 29, 1984 (age 41); Kailua, Hawaii, U.S.
- Listed height: 6 ft 3 in (1.91 m)
- Listed weight: 300 lb (136 kg)

Career information
- High school: Kailua
- College: Hawaii
- NFL draft: 2007: 2nd round, 60th overall pick

Career history
- Miami Dolphins (2007–2008); Oakland Raiders (2009–2011); Indianapolis Colts (2012–2013); Miami Dolphins (2014)

Awards and highlights
- PFWA All-Rookie Team (2007); PFW All-Rookie Team (2007); 2× First-team All-WAC (2005, 2006); 2× Second-team All-WAC (2003, 2004)

Career NFL statistics
- Games played: 118
- Games started: 114
- Fumble recoveries: 1
- Stats at Pro Football Reference

Samson H. Satele (born November 29, 1984) is an American former professional football player who was a center in the National Football League (NFL). He played college football for the Hawaii Rainbow Warriors and was selected in the second round of the 2007 NFL draft by the Miami Dolphins.

Satele also played for the Oakland Raiders and Indianapolis Colts.

== Early life ==
Satele attended Kailua High School in Hawaii where he was a First-team All-State Offensive lineman as a senior. He was also a three-time letterman in basketball and track, performing in the shot put and the discus. He was named the school's athlete of the year as a junior.

Regarded as a four-star recruit by Rivals.com, Satele was ranked as the No. 15 offensive guard prospect in the class of 2002. He picked his home-state team Hawaii over offers from Brigham Young, Nebraska, and Washington.

== College career ==
Satele was a four-year letterman at the University of Hawaii. While there, he majored in Sociology.

As a true freshman in 2002, he redshirted. As a redshirt freshman in 2003, he made his first career start at Left tackle. The final 13 starts of his redshirt freshman season were at Left guard, as he earned Second-team All-Conference honors. As a sophomore in 2004, he started all 13 games, including 10 at Left guard and three at Center. As a junior in 2005, he started all 12 games at Left guard and was named a First-team All-WAC selection. He helped Hawai'i rank second in the nation in passing offense (384.25 ypg) and 11th in total offense (476.17 ypg). As a senior in 2006, he served as a team captain as a senior, while starting all 12 games at Center. He was a First-team All-WAC selection. He helped lead the offense that led the nation in total offense (559.21 ypg), passing offense (441.29 ypg) and scoring (46.86 ppg).

Satele started each of the 53 games in which he played during his college career, a streak that was the longest among active players in college football in 2006.

== Professional career ==
=== Miami Dolphins (first stint) ===
Satele was selected in the second round (60th overall) of the 2007 NFL draft by the Miami Dolphins. This second round pick was acquired from the New England Patriots as part of the deal that sent Wes Welker to New England in 2007. As a rookie in 2007, he started all four preseason games and all 16 regular season games at Center. He was selected to the all-rookie team by the Dallas Morning News, NFL.com's Gil Brandt and Pro Football Weekly/Pro Football Writers of America, among others. During the 2008 season, Satele again started all 16 games at center but also guard late in the season. In the 2009 offseason, the Dolphins signed free agent center Jake Grove, prompting speculation Satele could move to right guard. Instead, the Dolphins traded him to the Oakland Raiders on March 23, 2009, in exchange for a sixth-round pick in the 2009 NFL draft and a swap of picks in the fourth round.

=== Oakland Raiders ===
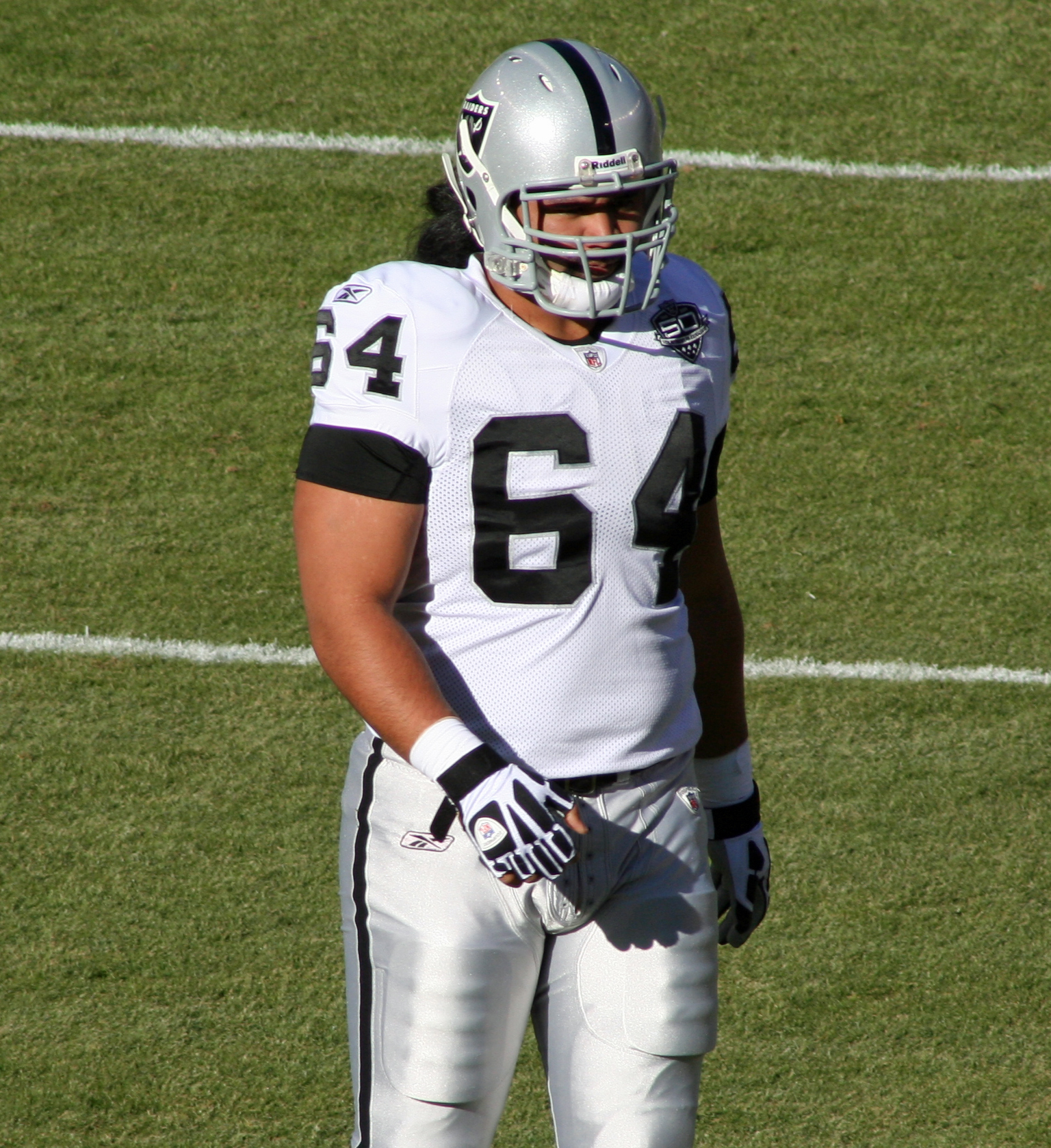
During his tenure with the Raiders in 2009

In 2009, Satele replaced Grove as the starting center, playing in 12 games. Although Satele was demoted at the beginning of the 2010 NFL season in favor of rookie Jared Veldheer, that lasted only one game. Satele got his job back the following week and started the rest of the season (15 games) for a team with their best won-lost record at 8–8 since winning the AFC championship game during the 2002 NFL season, playing on a good offensive line between Robert Gallery (12 games) at left guard and Cooper Carlisle (all 16 games) at right guard, helping Darren McFadden obtain 1,157 yards rushing and 5.2 yards per rush, the offense scoring 410 points.

On opening day of the 2011 NFL season, Satele played between Carlisle and a new left guard, rookie Stefen Wisniewski, helping Darren McFadden and others rush for 190 yards in a win against the Denver Broncos. The three linemen stayed together all year, the two guards starting all 16 games and Satele missing only one. Yet the offense was inconsistent, scoring a lower number of points (359), and the team stayed at 8–8.

=== Indianapolis Colts ===
On March 21, 2012, Satele signed with the Indianapolis Colts to replace long-time incumbent Jeff Saturday at center. On March 6, 2014, he was released by the Colts.

=== Miami Dolphins (second stint) ===
On August 2, 2014, Satele re-signed with the Dolphins after starting center Mike Pouncey underwent surgery. Satele played well enough that he kept a starting position after Pouncey returned, with the team moving Pouncey to right guard. He was released by the Dolphins at the end of the 2014 season and despite visits to the Bears and Seahawks, was not signed.

== Personal life ==
Satele is a cousin of former Dallas Cowboys' Brashton Satele, Cleveland Browns' Melila Purcell, Arizona Cardinals' Hercules Satele, Miami Dolphins' Reagan Maui'a, and Arena Football League's Isaac Leatiota.
