= Māori Americans =

Americans of Māori descent

Total population
- Alone (one ancestry); 1,034 (2020 census); 0.0003% of the total US population Alone or in combination 7,664 (2020 census); 0.0023% of the total US population

Regions with significant populations
- Arizona: 247
- California: 1,129
- Hawaii: 1,402
- Nevada: 258
- New York: 218
- Texas: 319
- Utah: 1,366
- Washington: 439

Languages
- English, Māori and Spanish

Religion
- Christianity, Māori religion

Related ethnic groups
- Pacific Islands Americans, Polynesians

Māori Americans are Americans of Māori descent, an ethnic group from New Zealand.

Some Māori are Mormons and are drawn to Mormon regions of Hawaii and Utah, as well as California, Arizona, and Nevada. Māori were part of the first Mormon Polynesian colony of the US, which was founded in Utah in 1889.

Since at least 1895, many Māori have immigrated to the US to study at universities and to seek employment opportunities, in addition to doing so for religious reasons.

== Notable people ==
=== Sports ===
- David Tukatahi Dixon, National Football League (NFL)
- TeTori Dixon, volleyball
- Rhett Ellison, National Football League (NFL)
- Riki Ellison, National Football League (NFL)
- Will Hinchcliff, National Football League (NFL)

=== Media ===
- Alex Aiono, singer
- Keala Settle, actress and singer
- Sasha Lane, actress
- Daniel Logan, actor

== See also ==
- New Zealand Americans
