= Palauan Americans =

Ethnic group

Total population
- 12,202

Languages
- American English, Palauan English, Palauan, Sonsorolese, Tobian, Spanish

Religion
- Christianity Modekngei

Palauan Americans are Americans of Palauan descent. According to the 2020 census, there are about 12,202 Americans of Palauan origin.

== History ==
Since the late 1940s, many Palauans have emigrated abroad. In 1953, about a hundred people from Palau founded the Palau Association in the American island of Guam. Over the years, the number of Palauans has continually grown.

In early 1970, when the Pell Grant was extended, several hundred Palauans and other students of Micronesia emigrated to study at American universities. Since then, the number of Palauan students emigrating to USA has increased by about 250 people every year.

Many Palauans live in California, most notably, Pasadena. Palauans also live in Portland, Oregon, where a few thousand Micronesians live, and Corsicana, Texas.

== Notable people ==
- Elgin Loren Elwais
- Florian Skilang Temengil
- Surangel Whipps Jr.
