= Moorbad Harbach =

- Municipality
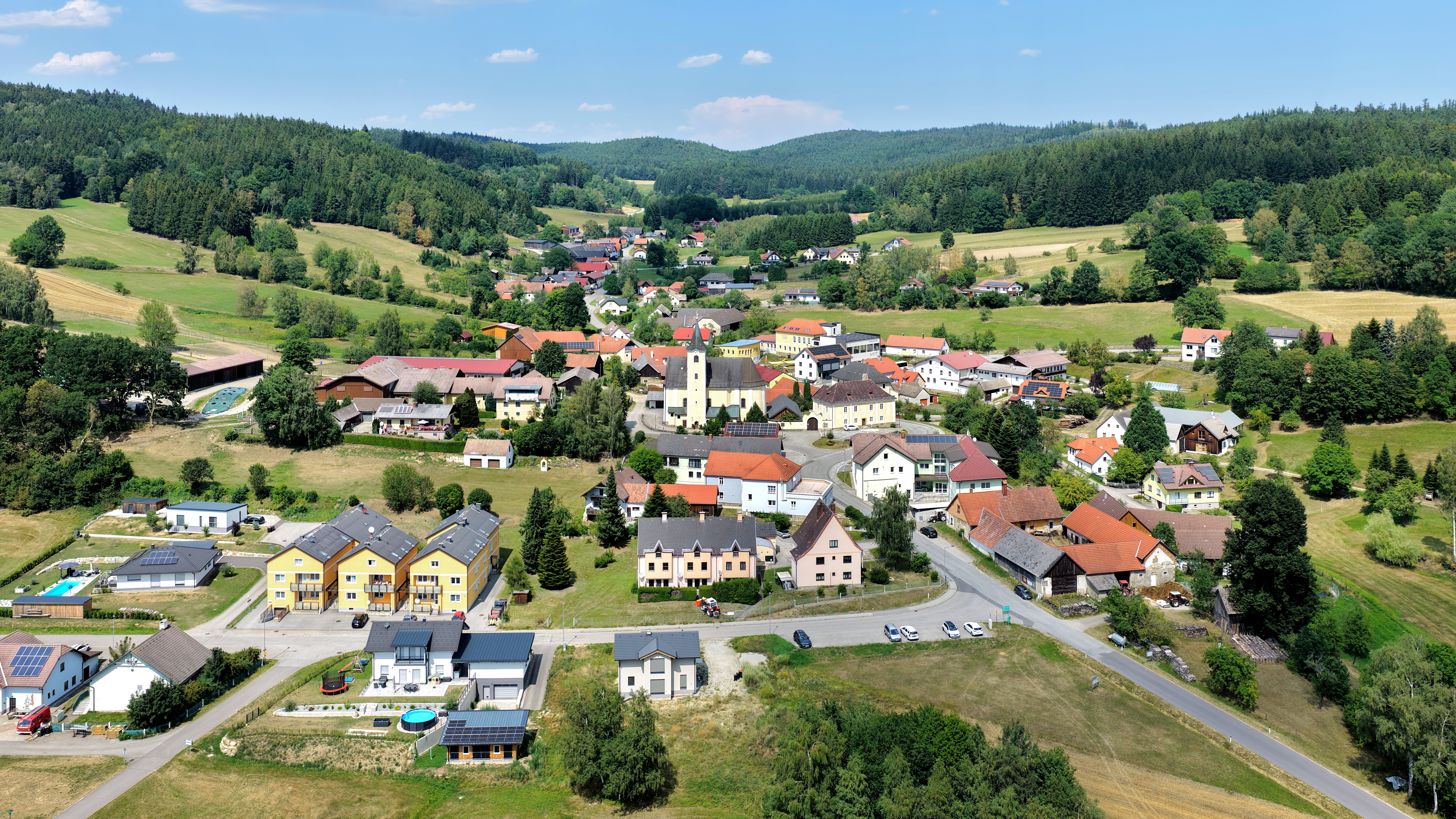
- South view of Moorbad Harbach

- Coat of arms

- Location within Austria
- Coordinates: 48°42′6″N 14°47′22″E
- Country: Austria
- State: Lower Austria
- District: Gmünd

Government
  - Mayor: Margit Göll

Area
  - Total: 35.5 km^{2} (13.7 sq mi)
- Elevation: 683 m (2,241 ft)

Population (2018-01-01)
  - Total: 717
  - Density: 20.2/km^{2} (52.3/sq mi)
- Time zone: UTC+1 (CET)
  - Summer (DST): UTC+2 (CEST)
- Postal code: 3970
- Area code: 02858
- Website: www.moorbad-harbach.gv.at

Moorbad Harbach is a town in the district of Gmünd in Lower Austria, Austria.
