= African emigration =

African emigration may refer to:

- African diaspora, the historical emigration of people from Africa
- Emigration from Africa, more recent migration from the continent
