= African immigration to Europe =

African immigrants in Europe are individuals residing in Europe who were born in Africa.

== History ==
The Roman Emperor Septimius Severus was born in Leptis Magna in North Africa, in what is now modern-day Tripolitania, Libya. Some North Africans moved to Britain during Roman rule.

Six white British men with the same very rare surname have been found to have a Y-chromosome haplogroup originating from an African male, likely dating to the 16th century or later.

== Migration flows ==
Since the 1960s, the main source countries of migration from Africa to Europe have been Morocco, Algeria, Tunisia and to a lesser extent, Egypt. This has resulted in large diasporas with origins in these countries by the end of the 20th century. In the period following the 1973 oil crisis, immigration controls in European states were tightened. The effect of this was not to reduce migration from North Africa but rather to encourage permanent settlement of previously temporary migrants and associated family migration. Much of this migration was from the Maghreb to France, the Netherlands, Belgium and Germany. From the second half of the 1980s, the destination countries for migrants from the Maghreb broadened to include Spain and Italy, as a result of increased demand for low-skilled labour in those countries.

Spain and Italy imposed visa requirements on migrants from the Maghreb in the early 1990s, and the result was an increase in irregular migration across the Mediterranean. Since 2000, the source countries of this irregular migration have grown to include sub-Saharan African states.

During 2000–2005, an estimated 440,000 people per year emigrated from Africa, most of them to Europe. According to Hein de Haas, the director of the International Migration Institute at the University of Oxford, public discourse on African migration to Europe portrays the phenomenon as an "exodus", largely composed of illegal migrants, driven by conflict and poverty. He criticises this portrayal, arguing that the illegal migrants are often well educated and able to afford the considerable cost of the journey to Europe. Migration from Africa to Europe, he argues, "is fuelled by a structural demand for cheap migrant labour in informal sectors". Most migrate on their own initiative, rather than being the victims of traffickers. Furthermore, he argues that whereas the media and popular perceptions see irregular migrants as mostly arriving by sea, most actually arrive on tourist visas or with false documentation, or enter via the Spanish enclaves, Ceuta and Melilla. He states that "the majority of irregular African migrants enter Europe legally and subsequently overstay their visas". Similarly, migration expert Stephen Castles argues that "Despite the media hysteria on the growth of African migration to Europe, actual numbers seem quite small – although there is a surprising lack of precision in the data".

According to the Organisation for Economic Co-operation and Development (OECD), migration from African countries to more developed states is small in comparison to overall migration worldwide. The BBC reported in 2007 that the International Organization for Migration estimates that around 4.6 million African migrants live in Europe, but that the Migration Policy Institute estimates that between 7 and 8 million illegal migrants from Africa live in the EU.

=== Illegal immigration ===
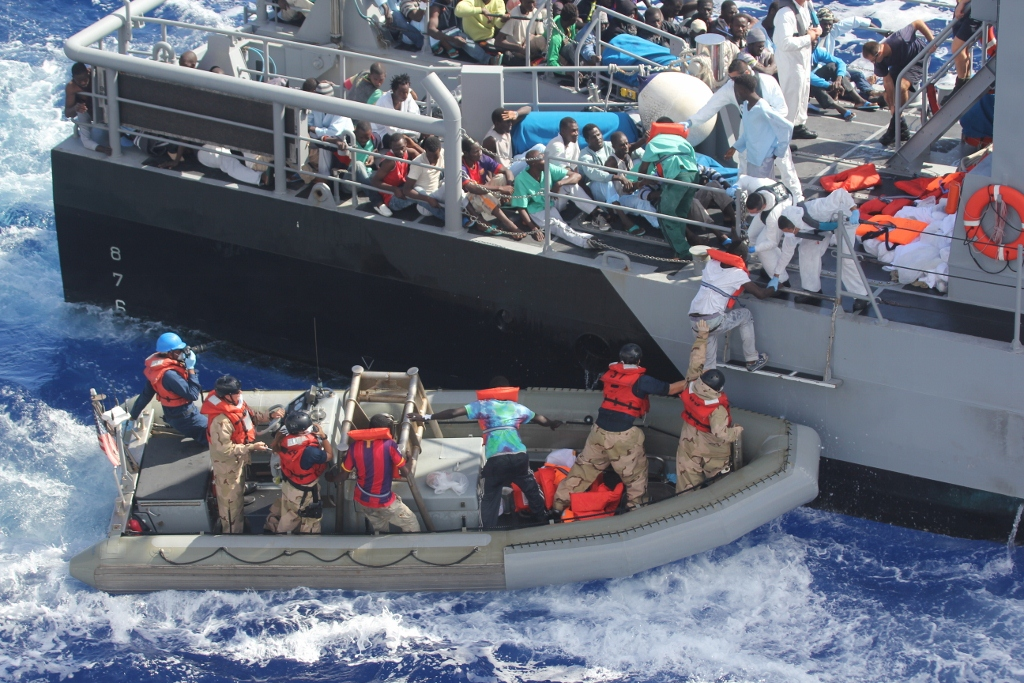
Rescued migrants, October 2013

Illegal migration from Africa to Europe is significant. Many people from less developed African countries embark on the dangerous journey for Europe, for economic purposes. In parts of Africa, particularly North Africa (Morocco, Mauritania, and Libya), trafficking immigrants to Europe has become more lucrative than drug trafficking. Illegal migration to Europe often occurs by boat via the Mediterranean Sea, or in some cases by land at the Spanish Enclaves of Ceuta and Melilla, and has made international headlines. Many Illegal migrants risk serious injury or death during their journey to Europe and most of those whose asylum requests were unsuccessful are deported back to Africa. Libya is the major departure point for illegal migrants setting off for Europe. However, undocumented African migrants in Europe have not necessarity entered Europe through unauthorized ways. Many of them, have entered with valid visas which they have overstayed. Faced with increased exclusion by European migration policies, many African migrants are left with no option than to enter and reside illegally. As Apostolos Andrikopoulos wrote, in this context of increased hostility and legal exclusion, many African migrants "turn to kinship in search of security, stability, and predictability". Kinship and social relations provide support to unauthorized migrants to deal with the precarity of their legal status.

Map of migration routes to North Africa and Europe from West Africa.

Between October 2013 and October 2014, the Italian government ran Operation Mare Nostrum, a naval and air operation intended to reduce unauthorized migration to Europe and the incidence of migratory ship wreckages off the coast of Lampedusa. The Italian government ceased the operation as it was judged to be unsustainable, involving a large proportion of the Italian navy. The operation was replaced by a more limited joint EU border protection operation, named Operation Triton managed by the EU border agency, Frontex. Some other European governments, including Britain's, argued that the operations such as Mare Nostrum and Triton serve to provide an "unintended pull factor" encouraging further migration.

In 2014, 170,100 illegal migrants were recorded arriving in Italy by sea (an increase from 42,925 arrivals recorded in 2013), 141,484 of them leaving from Libya. Most of them came from Syria, the Horn of Africa and West Africa.

The issue returned to international headlines with a series of migrant shipwrecks, part of the 2015 Mediterranean migration crisis. The International Organization for Migration (IOM) estimates suggest that between the start of 2015 and the middle of April, 21,000 migrants had reached the Italian coast and 900 migrants had died in the Mediterranean. Critics of European policy towards illegal migration in the Mediterranean argue that the cancellation of Operation Mare Nostrum failed to deter migrants and that its replacement with Triton "created the conditions for the higher death toll".

In September 2023, over 120 boats, carrying roughly 7,000 migrants from Africa–more than the total population of Lampedusa–arrived on the island within the span of 24 hours.

== Drivers of migration ==
Research on African migration shows that movements between Africa and Europe often follow non-linear and multi-step trajectories. People frequently migrate in stages, adjusting their plans as opportunities, security conditions, or personal networks change. These decisions are also shaped by a wider migration infrastructure, including intermediaries ('migration brokers'), transport routes, and administrative systems that influence where and how people travel.

Many migrants initially prefer to remain close to home, where cultural, linguistic, and social similarities make integration easier and allow them to maintain ties to family, livelihoods, and political life. Existing cross-border networks, built through earlier migration waves, also encourage movement to neighbouring countries. However, for those fleeing repression or conflict, neighbouring states may not provide sufficient safety. In such cases, moving further afield, including to Europe, can become a necessary protection strategy.

Reaching Europe does not always mean the end of mobility. Highly educated African migrants often encounter barriers to labour-market integration, such as difficulties finding work that matches their qualifications, financial insecurity, and experiences of racism. These factors sometimes prompt onward migration within Europe or a return to countries in Africa in search of better prospects and dignity.

Acquiring citizenship in a European country can serve multiple purposes. While it provides legal security and access to rights in Europe, it may also facilitate mobility back to Africa, making visits safer and enabling travel across the continent. A European passport can offer protection from political risk in the country of origin and enable migrants to sustain transnational connections.

== Effects ==
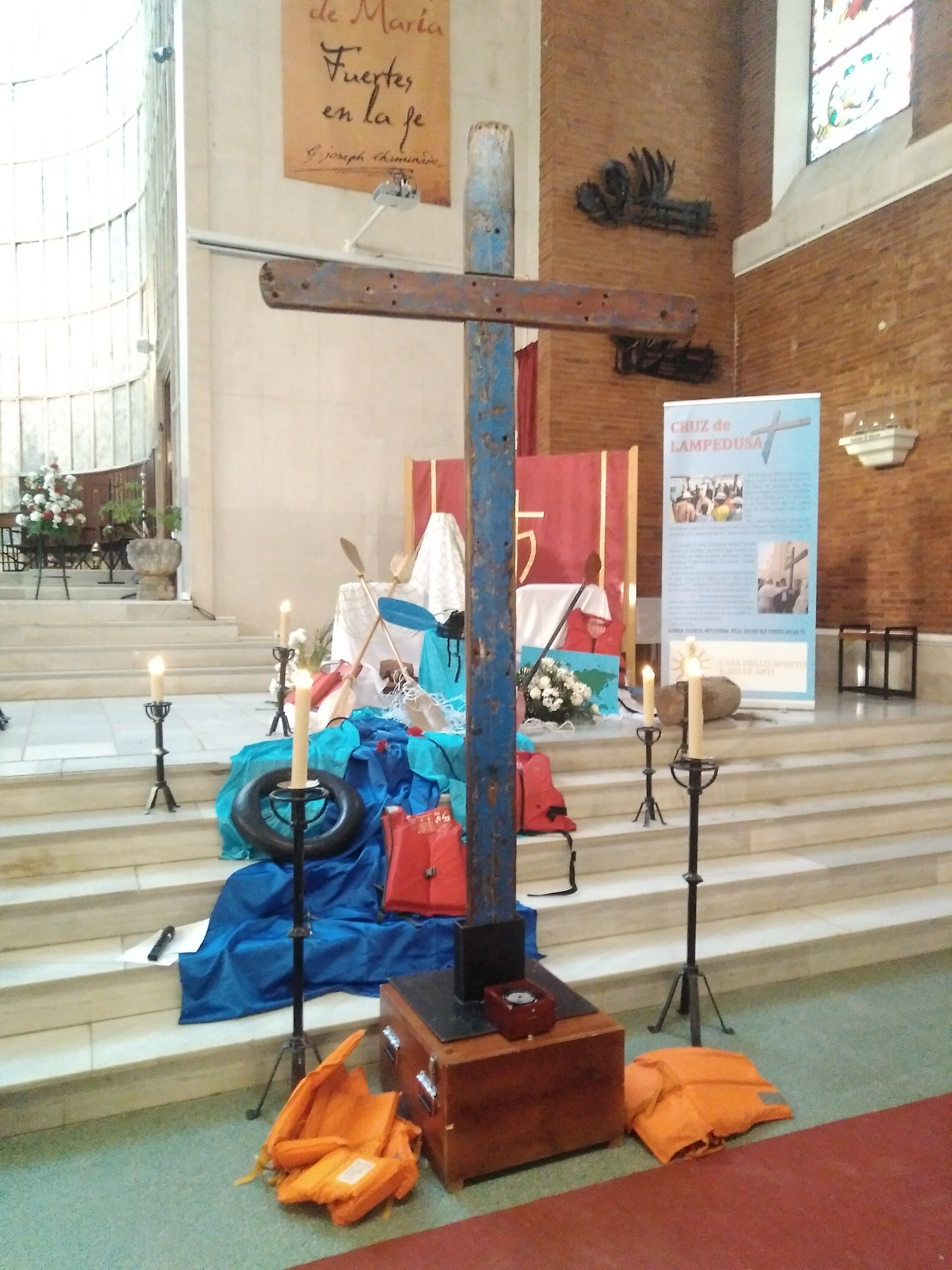
Cross made with wood of broken immigration boats in Lampedusa.

As far as the effects on source countries in Africa, an article in The Economist describes African migration as having some positive economic benefits for the African countries of origin (primarily from remittances, but also from showing "those at home the benefits of an education, encouraging more people to go to school").

As far as the impact on the destination countries in Europe, according to the BBC, there are rising numbers of crimes relating to African migration in Europe, specially Scandinavian countries, leading to opposition to immigration and the appearance of nationalist parties as the AfD, Sweden Democrats and Vox.

Thousands of migrants have died trying to cross the Sahara and the Mediterranean on their way to Europe.

== Immigration policies ==
=== European Union ===
The European Union does not have a common immigration policy regarding nationals of third countries. Some countries, such as Spain and Malta, have called for other EU member states to share the responsibility of dealing with migration flows from Africa. Spain has also created legal migration routes for African migrants, recruiting workers from countries including Senegal. Other states, such as France under the presidency of Nicolas Sarkozy, have adopted more restrictive policies, and tried to offer incentives for migrants to return to Africa. While adopting a more liberal approach than France, Spain has also, according to a Council on Foreign Relations report, "attempted to forge broad bilateral accords with African countries that would exchange repatriation for funding to help the returned migrants". On October 2026, the European Union interior ministers approved new rules for establishing return hubs and tighten deportation enforcement for illegal immigrants.

=== Spain ===
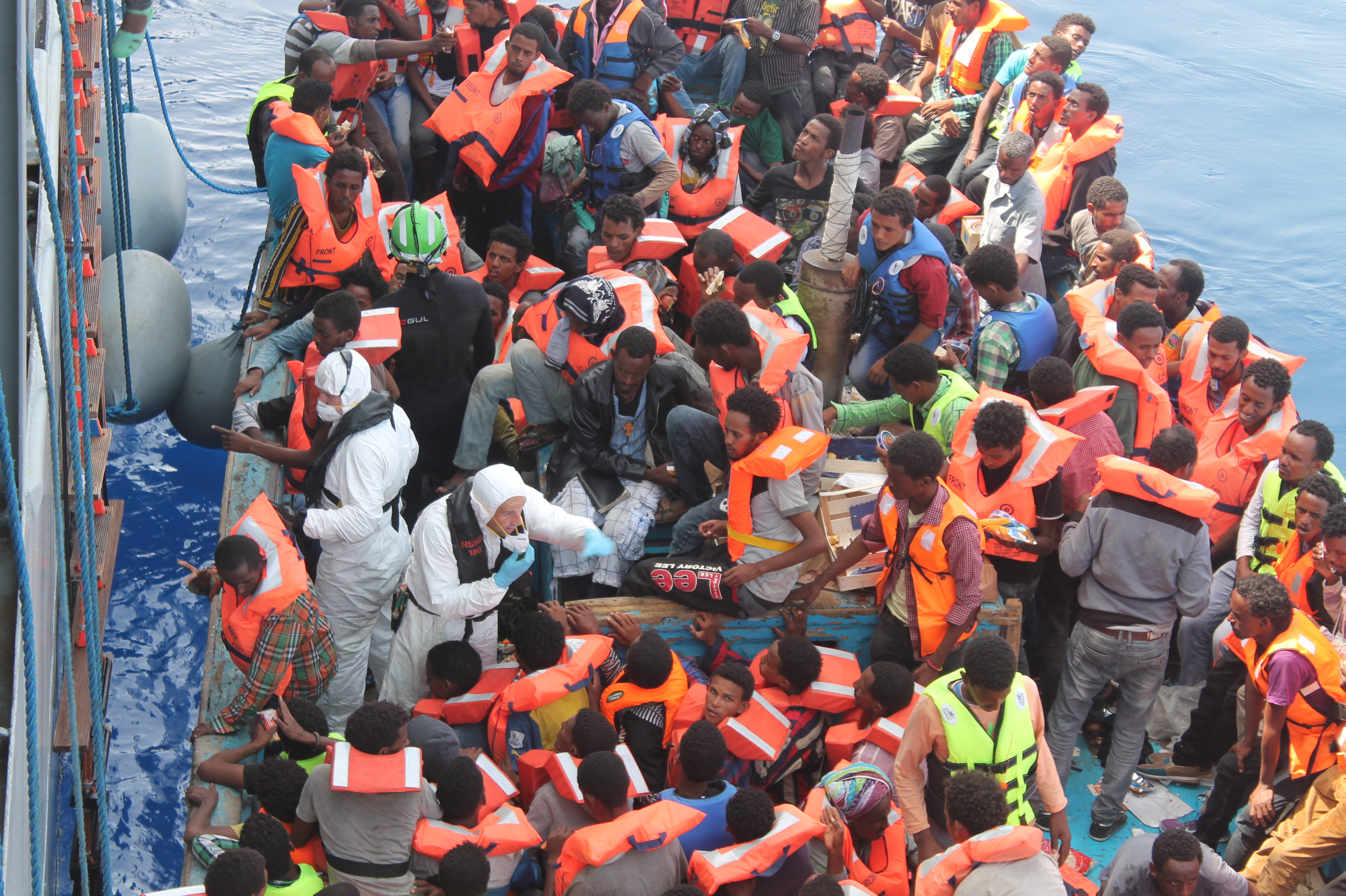
African migrants rescued near Libya during EU's Operation Triton, June 2015

Spain has also run regularisation programmes in order to grant employment rights to previously irregular immigrants, most notably in 2005, but this has been the subject of criticism from other EU governments, which argue that it encourages further irregular migration and that regularised migrants are likely to move within the EU to richer states once they have status in Spain.

=== Netherlands ===
De Haas argues that restrictive European immigration policies have generally failed to reduce migration flows from Africa because they do not address the underlying structural demand for labour in European states. Dirk Kohnert argues that EU countries' policies on migration from Africa are focused mainly on security and the closing of borders. He is also skeptical that the EU's programmes that are designed to promote economic development in West Africa will result in reduced migration.

=== Australia ===
Stephen Castles argues that there is a "sedentary bias" in developed states' migration policies towards Africa. He argues that "it has become the conventional wisdom to argue that promoting economic development in the Global South has the potential to reduce migration to the North. This carries the clear implication that such migration is a bad thing, and poor people should stay put".

=== France ===
Julien Brachet argues that while "irregular migration from sub-Saharan Africa to Europe is very limited in absolute and relative numbers", "none" of the European migration policies implemented in northern and western Africa "has ever led to a real and sustainable decrease in the number of migrants" travelling towards Europe, but they have "directly fostered the clandestine transport of migrants".

=== Tunisia ===
In April 2025, Tunisian authorities dismantled makeshift camps sheltering approximately 7,000 sub-Saharan African migrants and began forcibly deporting some of them. According to National Guard official Houssem Eddine Jebabli, forced repatriations began on 4 April, and authorities were also pursuing voluntary returns. The operation followed a 2023 government crackdown, when President Kais Saied described the influx of sub-Saharan migrants as a conspiracy to alter Tunisia’s demographics. This rhetoric drew condemnation from local human rights groups and the African Union, which criticized the government's treatment of migrants and accused it of inciting racial hatred. Despite the criticism, Tunisia has received praise from Italian authorities for curbing irregular migration flows to Europe.

== Demographics ==
This table takes both North Africans and Sub-Saharan Africans into account, most numbers also only account for those born in the continent, for numbers of purely Sub-Saharan Africans or Black people, and their descendants of either full or mixed-race, refer to the page Afro-European.

Country	African population	Year	Population centres	Description
France	Approx. 8,000,000−10,000,000	2025	Paris, Lyon, Toulouse, Bordeaux, Marseille, Nantes, Lille, Montpellier	Includes anyone who was born in Africa. Most have ties to former French colonies. According to the INSEE, there are 7.6 million people who were born in North Africa or had North African ancestry, mainly from Algeria, Morocco, Tunisia. There are about as many Sub-Saharan African immigrants and descendants, mainly from Senegal, Mali, Ivory Coast, Cameroon, Democratic Republic of the Congo and Republic of the Congo. See also: Black people in France
United Kingdom	1,656,000	2021	London, Birmingham, Manchester, Leeds, Sheffield, Bristol, Nottingham, Newcastle upon Tyne	2021 ONS estimates of population born in Africa; includes only foreign-born population. Most have ties to former British colonies in Africa. Largest groups from South Africa, Nigeria, Kenya, Zimbabwe, Somalia, Ghana, Uganda, The Gambia, Sierra Leone and Libya. See also: Black British
Turkey	1,500,000	2017	Istanbul, İzmir, Muğla, Ankara, Antalya	Mainly nationals from Cameroon, Libya, Algeria, Somalia, Niger, Nigeria, Kenya, Sudan, Egypt and Ethiopia. See also: Afro Turks and Africans in Turkey
Spain	1,322,625	2021	Barcelona, Madrid, Málaga, Murcia, Palma, Seville, Valencia	Mostly from Morocco and Algeria, but also includes some from West Africa countries such as Senegal, Nigeria, and Cape Verde, and the former Spanish colonies, such as Equatorial Guinea. Many sub-Saharan Africans are contract labor workers. See also: Afro-Spaniard
Italy	1,150,627	2021	Rome, Milan, Turin, Palermo, Brescia, Bologna, Lecce, Florence, Ferrara, Genoa, Venice	Mainly from North-African countries such as Morocco, Tunisia, Libya, Egypt and Algeria, but also from West Africa (Nigeria, Senegal, Mali, Ivory Coast, Burkina Faso, and Ghana) and the former Italian colonies (Eritrea, Somalia). Doesn't include irregular migrants from Mediterranean Crossings who decide to remain in Italy. See also: African immigrants to Italy
Germany	1,000,000	2020	Berlin, Hamburg, Frankfurt, Cologne, Munich, Stuttgart	Mainly from Algeria, Egypt, Morocco and Tunisia and former German colonies like Cameroon and Togo plus other migrants mainly from Kenya, Eritrea, Ghana, Nigeria and Ethiopia. About a 50–50 split between Black Sub Saharans and Arab/Berber North Africans. Includes students, workers, and other skilled and unskilled legal immigrants as well as some asylum seekers and irregular migrants, but not those with a German passport, of African descent or from the diaspora in other countries. See also: Afro-Germans and Migration background
Netherlands	714,732	2020	Randstad area; Arnhem–Nijmegen metropolitan area	Majority from Morocco, but large minorities from countries such as Somalia, Egypt, South Africa, Ghana, Cape Verde and Eritrea. See also: Afro-Dutch people
Portugal	700,000		Lisbon metropolitan area, Algarve	Mostly from former Portuguese colonies in Africa, particularly Cape Verde, Angola, Guinea-Bissau, and São Tomé (see Afro-Portuguese people). 47% of foreign legal residents in 2001 were originally from an African country.
Belgium	550,000–600,000	2018	Brussels, Liège, Antwerp, Charleroi	Most have roots in the former Belgian Congo and other French-speaking African countries. Mostly from Morocco, Rwanda, Algeria, Democratic Republic of the Congo, Senegal, Ghana, Guinea, Burundi, Cameroon, Nigeria and Djibouti. See also: Afro-Belgian
Switzerland	93,800	2015	Geneva, Basel, Vevey, Bern, Fribourg, Lausanne, Zurich, Lucerne	Mostly from Morocco, Tunisia and Eritrea, but also large groups from Democratic Republic of the Congo, Cameroon (Basel Misson historical ties) , Angola and Somalia (excluding people of African ancestry from other parts of the world: Dominican Republic and Brazil). See also: African immigrants to Switzerland
Finland	At least 70,592	2023	Helsinki, Espoo, Vantaa, Turku, Vaasa	I.e., according to Statistics Finland, people in Finland: • whose both parents are African-born, • or whose only known parent was born in Africa, • or who were born in Africa and whose parents' countries of birth are unknown. Thus, for example, people with one Finnish parent and one African parent or people with more distant African ancestry are not included in this country-based non-ethnic figure. Also, African-born adoptees' backgrounds are determined by their adoptive parents, not by their biological parents. They are mainly from Somalia, Nigeria, Morocco, DR Congo, Ethiopia, and Ghana. See also: African immigration to Finland

== Statistics ==
The rate of immigration is projected to continue to increase in the coming decades, according to Sir Paul Collier, a development economist.

Asylum applicants in Europe

Note: Asylum applicants to Europe are first-time applicants after the removal of withdrawn applications. Sub Saharan African migrant may enter each destination by other than the means displayed in this chart. Consequently, these flow figures are incomplete and likely represent minimums. Increases in migrant stocks and inflows are not the same. Source: Pew Research Center.

	Sub-Saharan African asylum applicants to Europe
2010	58,000
2011	84,000
2012	74,000
2013	91,000
2014	139,000
2015	164,000
2016	196,000
2017	168,000

Origin countries of sub-Saharan migrants living in Europe

Top countries of birth of sub-Saharan migrants living in the European Union, Norway and Switzerland in 2017. Source: Pew Research Center.

	European Union, Norway and Switzerland
Nigeria	390,000
South Africa	310,000
Somalia	300,000
Senegal	270,000
Ghana	250,000
Angola	220,000
Kenya	180,000
DR Congo	150,000
Cameroon	150,000
Ivory Coast	140,000

== See also ==
- Emigration from Africa
- African Australians
- African New Zealanders
- African immigration to the United States
- African immigration to Canada
- African immigration to Latin America
- Black Europeans of African ancestry
- Migrants' African routes
- Threats facing illegal immigrants
