= Helena Maleno =

Spanish-Moroccan human rights defender

Helena Maleno Garzón
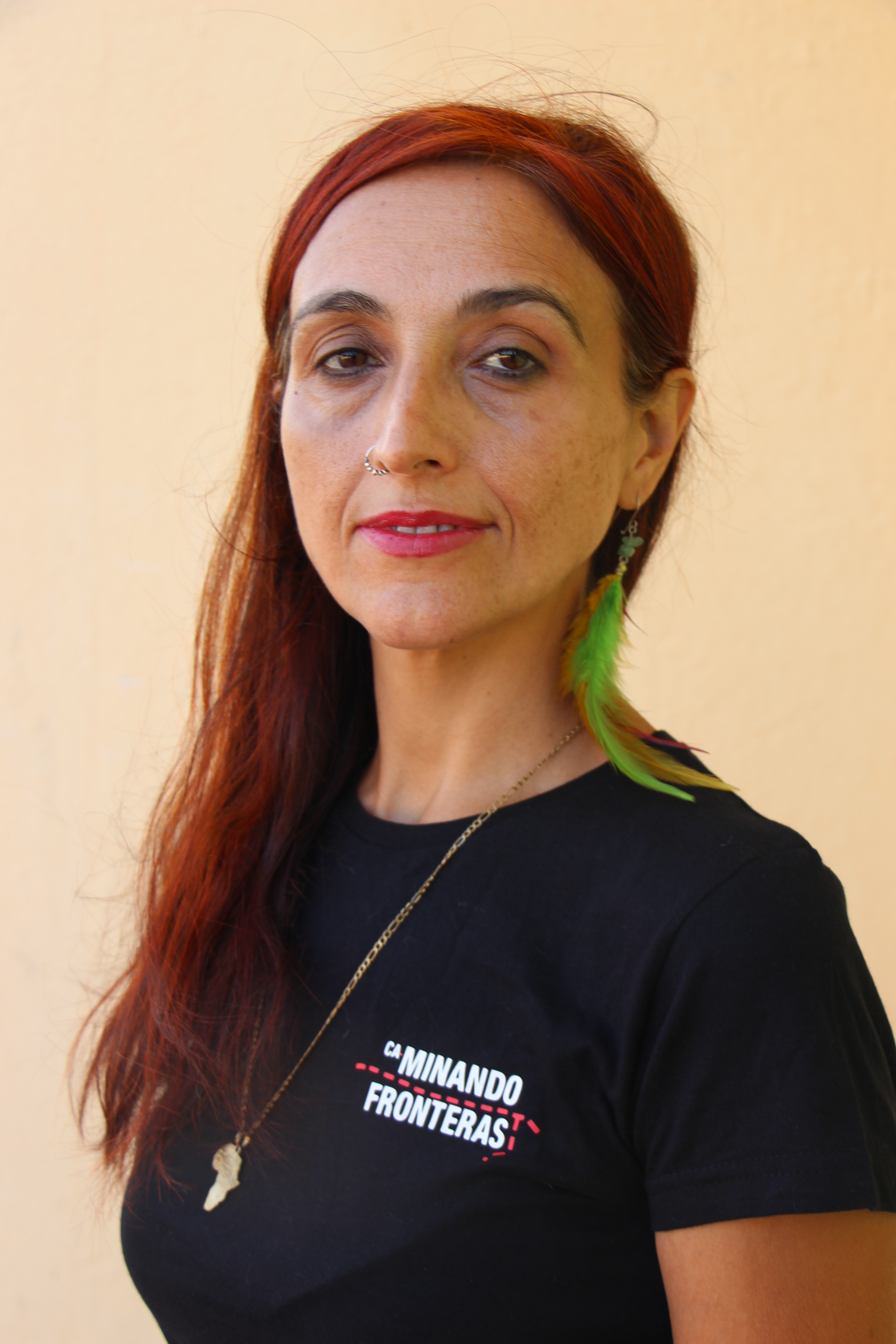
- Born: 1 August 1970 (age 56); El Ejido, Spain
- Writing career
- Language: Human rights defender

Helena Maleno Garzón (born 1 August 1970) is a Spanish-Moroccan human rights defender, journalist, researcher, documentalist and writer. She is a specialist in the migration and trafficking in human beings, and is Doctor Honoris Causa from the University of Illes Balears. She is the Founder & CEO of Colectivo Caminando Fronteras (lit. "Walking Borders Collective").

Since 2001 she has denounced the violations of Human Rights in the Western European border. Maleno works on supporting and empowering the sub-Saharan migrant communities during the migratory process, specially women and children victims of violence.

== Trajectory ==
Maleno was born in El Ejido. There, she began her contact with the migrants as a labor advisor for the Laborers of the Field Syndicate.

In 2001 she moved to Morocco with her son Ernesto where she began to build friendships and partnerships with organized migrant communities. She developed research on border externalization, deportations and asylum for organizations such as Sos Racismo, Intermón Oxfam or the Jesuit Refugee Service. She was a delegate in Morocco of the Spanish Commission for Refugee Aid (CEAR) between 2007 and 2009.

She works for Women's Link Worldwide in different roles where she analyzes the migration process from perspective of gender. Helena has conducted research in Nigeria, Colombia, Germany, Denmark, France, Morocco, and Spain, where she compares and exposes the problem of trafficking as an international and industrial framework of contemporary slavery. She also does this for the Ombudsman of Spain as one of the few external consultants of the institution, being the author of the National Monographic Report on Trafficking in Human Beings.

Maleno was a consultant for the MENA region (Middle East and North Africa) for the United Nations Rapporteur on the right to international solidarity and she is the author of the report 'Action aid / Alianza por la Solidaridad 'Alzando Voces: Mujeres que migran', presented in the European Parliament and in the Global Compact for Migration in Marrakech.

Helena Maleno gives conferences and workshops on human trafficking and migration to institutions such as the General Council of the Judiciary of Spain, the regional ombudsmen, Spanish and Latin American universities, local councils and regional governments and organisations such as the International Red Cross, Religious Europeans Against Human Trafficking, the State Coordinator of ONGD and the Fund for Global Human Rights. Helena has inaugurated the Open Borders Conference of New York and closed the International Film Festival and Forum on Human Rights in Geneva (Switzerland).

She writes in Spanish information media for Eldiario.es and Público.

In 2015, her collective, Caminando Fronteras, premiered the documentary Tarajal: Transforming pain into justice of which she is a scriptwriter and interviewer. The footage tells the events of the controversial tragedy on the Spanish beach of Tarajal through the perspective of the families of the victims, which are organized in a process unprecedented in sub-Saharan Africa to demand responsibility from European states and achieve justice.

In 2017 she was elected as one of the 10 African women of the year by the newspaper El País. She is also a member of the Panel of Experts for the Aurora Prize for Awakening Humanity and is on the jury of the human rights award of the Spanish Human Rights Association.

In the field of art, she participates in exhibitions such as Geography and Mobility (Vienna), Utopia (London) and the Political Art Biennial of Cairo. She is the director of several video-reports, and editor of the audiovisual piece Frontera Sur, production assistant of the CNN and BBC documentary Living with illegals and screenwriter of "Children on the road" for Save The Children.

== Desert accident ==
On 1 October 2005, the migrant communities reported to Helena massive detentions in Moroccan cities. Hundreds of people were deported and abandoned in the desert, where many of them died. By telephone, the defendant reported the situation. Journalist Luis de Vega wrote in ABC, "Talk to me. Tell me things to keep me going," that is what they told her in desperate calls "24 hours a day", so as the journalist said.

On 8 October Helena left with a commission that she had organised to take 500 rations of food from Tangier for abandoned migrants and at the same time, to document the tragedy. For the next few days, they followed the convoys with dozens of men, pregnant women and migrant children that were forced to displace themselves to the desert. "Valued information that left from the van to the entire world", the newspaper ABC told.

Nevertheless, after travelling more than 6.000 kilometres by car, an accident occurred with another convoy. Those worse injured were Helena and her colleague Francisco. They were treated at a hospital in El Aaiún and then moved to Las Palmas de Gran Canaria. She needed several months in a wheelchair to recover from her wounds.

== Criminalization and international support ==
For years, as a human rights defender, Helena Maleno Garzón has suffered from calls, persecutions and aggressions that aim to put an end to the work she does through her organization and that has endangered her own life. One of the most serious episodes was the one suffered in the neighborhood of Boukhalef (Tangier) in 2014, when Helena suffered an assassination attempt after trying to protect women and children in racists raids.

In August 2017, she received a photo of a gun loaded with the message "I suggest silence or you will die, you are bothering the authorities". Organisations launched a campaign in her behalf under the slogan “defend who defends”, which was signed by more than 500 entities such as Amnesty International, Médicos del Mundo, the Andalusian Ombudsman or political parties. Next, the World Organization Against Torture and the International Federation for Humans Rights issued a communiqué demanding that the states resolve political responsibilities and guarantee the safety of the human rights defender.

On 5 December 2017, Helena Maleno was summoned to appear before the Moroccan judicial system in the Appeals Court. She was accused of "people trafficking, and being in favoring of illegal immigration". The charges brought against her, mean she can face up to life imprisonment, for making calls to rescue services to alert them that people attempting to cross the sea were in danger. The judge confirmed that the accusations have been based in four criminal reports prepared by the UCRIF (unity of the Spanish Police in charge of border control). One investigation that began in 2012 without any judicial control, violates the fundamental rights of the Defendant. This was brought to light by the Special Rapporteur on extrajudicial, summary or arbitrary executions and the Special Rapporteur on the situation of Human Rights Defenders of the United Nations in their respective reports on the case.

The political persecution has been responded to with an international campaign of solidarity under the slogan #DefendiendoAMaleno (#DefendingMaleno). More than a thousand organisations and 200 personalities including Javier Bardem, Luis García Montero, Almudena Grandes and Joaquín Sabina among others, endorsed the manifesto in support of Helena.

The case had originally been filed by the Spanish National Court (Audiencia Nacional), but because no crime had been committed, the criminal reports were sent to Morocco. In support of the accused, it was reported that 56,000 letters were sent to the Spanish Home Office and the Spanish Ministry of Foreign Affairs in less than 36 hours. These letters demanded that the case be thrown out by the Moroccan court. Institutions such as the Catholic Church, the Madrid City Council or in her hometown (known for its racist episodes), also joined the campaign, which unanimously approved motions in support of the human rights defender. The campaign was as well supported by the President of the Spanish Parliament, Ana Pastor, who declared: “You are a woman who has left everything to be where help is needed, and to defend the life and the rights of people. The citizens of Spain should be supporting you”.

On March 11 of 2019, The Tangier court investigating the case against Maleno for alleged human trafficking overturned it, recognizing his work as a defender of Human Rights. “At a time when the defense of the rights of migrants is criminalized in Europe, this case file is an exemplary statement to continue our work”, the defender said after finding out the case resolution. Moroccan human rights organizations celebrated the win as an unprecedented occurrence, that established jurisprudence for the defense of the right to life at the border. One of the main Moroccan newspapers, Akhbar Alyawm headlined: “Moroccan justice internationally embarrasses the Spanish police and overturns the case against Helena Maleno".

Despite her victories in court, Helena's persecution has not ceased. On 23 January Helena reported having been violently deported from her home in Morocco, being separated from her young daughter for 32 days. In a video published on social media and in the press, Helena stated: 'in the last year I have been the victim of 37 attacks, death threats, aggressions, phone taps and break-ins at my home'. In her defence, the principal worldwide human rights entities (FIDH, OMCT, Front Line Defenders, Amnesty International, International Service for Human Rights and the Urgent Action Fund for Women's Human Rights) sent a letter to the Prime Minister of Spain demanding justice for Helena Maleno, which was signed by more than 700 Spanish and international entities including the Catholic Church, the State Coordinator of NGOs, Oxfam Intermón and the Spanish Human Rights Association. The Spanish Minister of Exterior Affairs, Arancha González Laya said of Helena Maleno in the Spanish Parliament: "The Government of Spain respects her work as a defender of human rights for which she has earned numerous awards". Other Ministers publicly pledged their support for Maleno. However, the international organisations are awaiting a statement from the Prime Minister Pedro Sánchez amid the persistent criminalisation of the human rights defender by the Ministry of the Interior, the UCRIF and the National Police.

== Awards ==
- Human Rights Prize 2014 of the Progressive Union of Prosecutors.
- Human Rights Prize 2015 of the General Council of the Spanish Advocacy.
- Distinction for the Defense of the Rights of Migrants Women of the Andalusian Institute of Women (2016)
- Distinction for the Defense of the Rights of Women Victims of Trafficking of Amaranta Foundation (2017).
- Special Mention of the Dignity Prizes 2017 of the Granada's City Hall.
- Fraternity Award 2017 of Mundo Negro.
- Puñetas Periféricas Award 2018 of the Association of Legal Communicators.
- Gernika's Prize for Peace and Reconciliation 2018 at the 81º anniversary of the tragedy.
- Valors Award 2018 of the Council of Catalan Advocacy.
- Etnosur Prize 2018 of the Etnosur Music Festival.
- Séan McBride Peace Prize 2018 of International Peace Bureau.
- Abba Melaku Award 2018 of the Solidarity Initiatives Center Ángel Olarán.
- National Award of Journalism of the Spanish Association os Human Rights.
- Emilio Castelar Award 2019 from Progressive Association of Spain.
- Padre Arrupe Award 2019 from the Pontifical University of Comillas.
- Solidarity Encounter with the People of Africa and Latin America (ESPAL) Award 2019
- Pimental Fonseca 2019 Award from the International Festival of Civil Journalism of Italy.
- Award nomination for the Aurora Prize for Awakening Humanity 2019
- Garcia Caparrós Award 2020 from Memoria y Cultura Foundation
- International Woman Award 2021 from the Town hall of Sant Quirze del Vallès.
- Honorary Doctorate from the University of Illes Balears (UIB)
- Honorary Award 2021 from the Progresist University of Catalonia.
- Woman of Courage Award 2021 from the United Nations Anima (UNANIMA)
- Extremadura Global 2021 Award from the Government of Extremadura
- ACAMPA International Human Rights Recognition 2022
- Humanizar 2022 Award from the Spanish Center for the Humanization of Health.

== Books ==
- "Gender Transitions Along Borders. The Northern Borderlands of Mexico and Morocco" . Co-author. Routledge Editorial, New York 2016
- "Todas: crónicas de violencias contra las mujeres". Co-author. Libros.com Editorial, Spain 2018
- "Mujer de Frontera" Planeta Editorial, Spain 2020
