= Spanish diaspora =

Emigrants from Spain and their descendants

Spanish: Diáspora Española

Total population
- Spanish nationals abroad: 3,045,966 ▲ (2025 est) (of which 859,378 were born in Spain)

Regions with significant populations
- Number of Spanish citizens by country
- Argentina: 505,940
- France: 320,749
- United States: 220,715
- Switzerland: 193,255
- Germany: 188,250
- United Kingdom: 169,940
- Cuba: 167,684
- Brazil: 140,319
- Venezuela: 138,394
- Mexico: 136,225
- Belgium: 77,909
- Uruguay: 67,414
- Chile: 66,399
- Ecuador: 58,646
- Romania: 46,000
- Colombia: 37,086
- Netherlands: 29,984
- Peru: 28,425
- Dominican Republic: 27,310
- Andorra: 26,558
- Italy: 25,446
- Australia: 22,785
- Canada: 18,118
- Portugal: 16,981
- Bolivia: 16,676
- Panama: 14,503
- Morocco: 11,342
- Sweden: 11,235
- Ireland: 10,681
- Philippines: 4,952
- El Salvador: 2,877
- Ukraine: 965

Languages
- Spanish languages (mainly Spanish, also Basque, Catalan, Galician, Astur-Leonese, etc.), French, English, Portuguese, German, and others.

Religion
- Predominantly Roman Catholicism

Related ethnic groups
- Portuguese; French; Italians other Western Europeans · Hispanics; Sephardi Jews

The Spanish diaspora consists of Spanish people and their descendants who emigrated from Spain.

In the Americas, the term most often refers to residents with Spanish nationality; this is in contrast to "Hispanic" which in English usually describes Spanish-speaking populations in general.

The diaspora is concentrated in places that were part of the Spanish Empire. Countries with sizeable populations are Argentina, Bolivia, Chile, Colombia, Costa Rica, Cuba, Dominican Republic, Ecuador, El Salvador, Guatemala, Honduras, Mexico, Nicaragua, Panama, Paraguay, Peru, Uruguay, Venezuela, and, to a lesser extent, Brazil, Belize, Haiti, United States, Canada, the Philippines and wider Europe.

According to the latest data from the Instituto Nacional de Estadística's Register of Spaniards Resident Abroad (PERE), "the number of people with Spanish nationality living abroad reached 3,045,966 on January 1, 2025, an increase of 4.7% (137,317 people) with respect to the data from the same day last year". However, most of them are naturalized citizens returning to their countries of origin or remigrating elsewhere; only about 855,000 natural born Spaniards (about 2% of the population) live overseas.

== History ==
=== Origins (1402–1521) ===
Castile, under the reign of Henry III, began the colonization of the Canary Islands in 1402, authorizing under feudal agreement to Norman noblemen Jean de Béthencourt. The conquest of the Canary Islands, inhabited by Guanche people, was only finished when the armies of the Crown of Castille won, in long and bloody wars, the islands of Gran Canaria (1478–1483), La Palma (1492–1493) and Tenerife (1494–1496).

The marriage of the Reyes Católicos (Ferdinand II of Aragon and Isabella I of Castile) created a confederation of reigns, each with their own administrations, but ruled by a common monarchy. According to Henry Kamen, it was only after centuries of a common rule that these separate realms formed a fully unified state.

In 1492, Spain drove out the last Moorish king of Granada. After their victory, the Catholic monarchs negotiated with Christopher Columbus, a Genoese sailor attempting to reach Cipangu by sailing west. Castile was already engaged in a race of exploration with Portugal to reach the Far East by sea when Columbus made his bold proposal to Isabella. Columbus instead inadvertently "discovered" the Americas, inaugurating the Spanish colonization of the continents. The Indies were reserved for Castile.

=== Age of Discovery ===
After the Age of Discovery, the Spanish were the earliest and one of the largest communities to emigrate out of Europe, and the Spanish Empire's expansion during the first half of the 16th century saw an "extraordinary dispersion of the Spanish people", with particular concentrations "in North and South America", mainly the vice-royalties of the New Spain and Peru.

During the first half of the 16th century, following the Age of Discovery, the Spanish became one of Europe's first and largest emigrating populations. The rapid expansion of the Spanish Empire led to an unprecedented dispersal of Spanish people, primarily concentrated in the vice-royalties of New Spain and Peru in the Americas.

=== After the 19th century ===
Between 1846 and 1932 nearly five million Spaniards went to the Americas, mostly to South America in general and to Argentina, Brazil, Venezuela in particular.

Unprecedented waves of emigrants left Spain during the sixties and the seventies for other European countries. However, shortly after signing the Treaty of Adherence to join the European Community in 1985, Spain went from being a sender to a receiver country.

== Africa ==
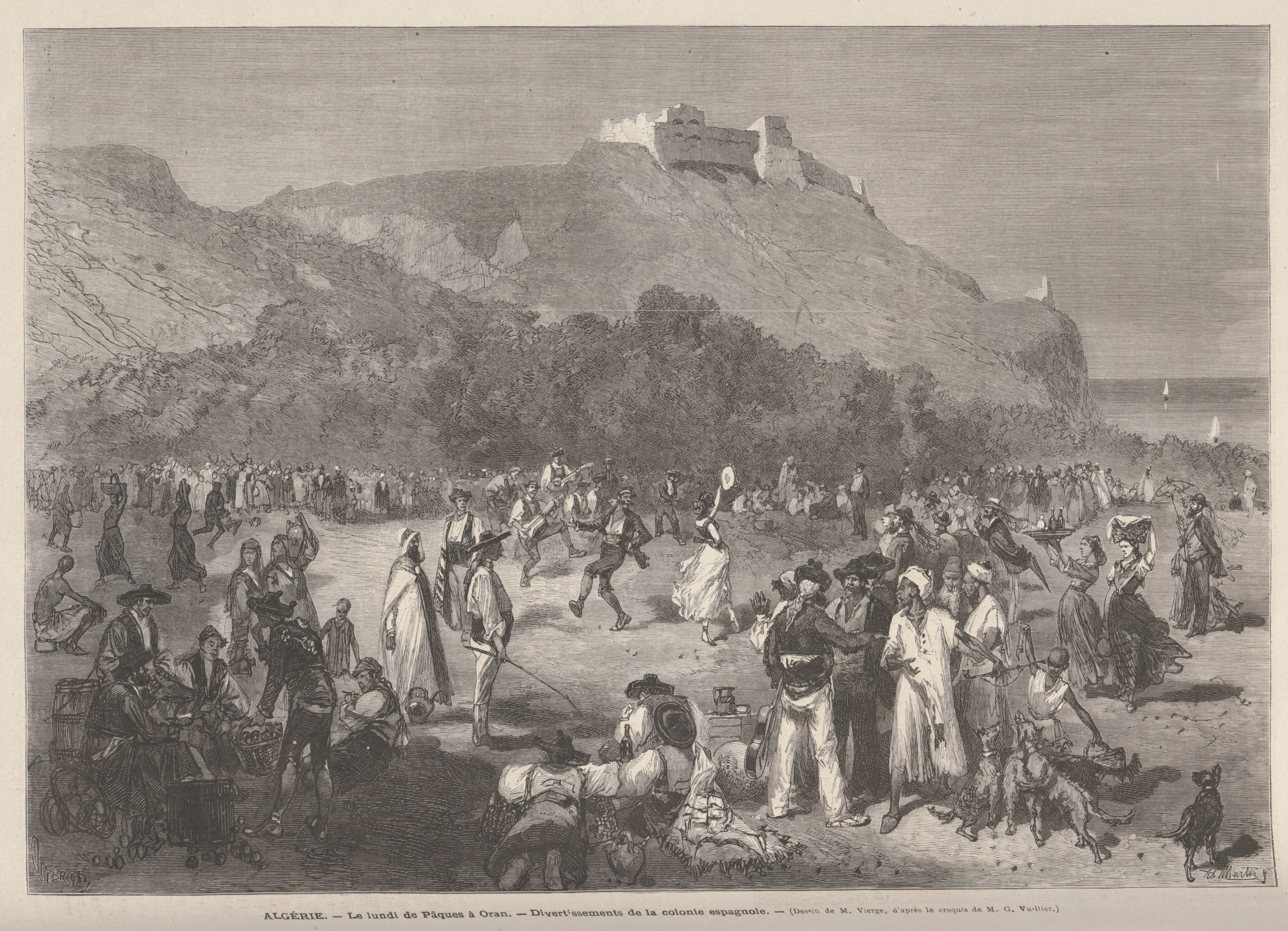
Spanish settlers in Oran, Algeria

=== Conquest of the Canary Islands ===
The first period of the conquest of the Canaries was carried out by the Norman nobles Jean de Béthencourt and Gadifer de la Salle. Their motives were primarily economic as Béthencourt possessed textile factories and dye works and the Canaries offered a source of dyes such as the orchil lichen. The treaty settled disputes between Castile and Portucalense County over the control of the Atlantic, in which Castilian control of the Canary islands was recognized but which also confirmed Portuguese possession of the Azores, Madeira, the Cape Verde islands and gave them rights to lands discovered and to be discovered as well as any other island which might be found and conquered from the Canary islands beyond toward Guinea.

The Castilians continued to dominate the islands, but due to the topography and the resistance of the native Guanches, complete pacification was not achieved until 1495, when Tenerife and La Palma were finally subdued by Alonso Fernández de Lugo. After that, the Canaries were incorporated into the Kingdom of Castile.

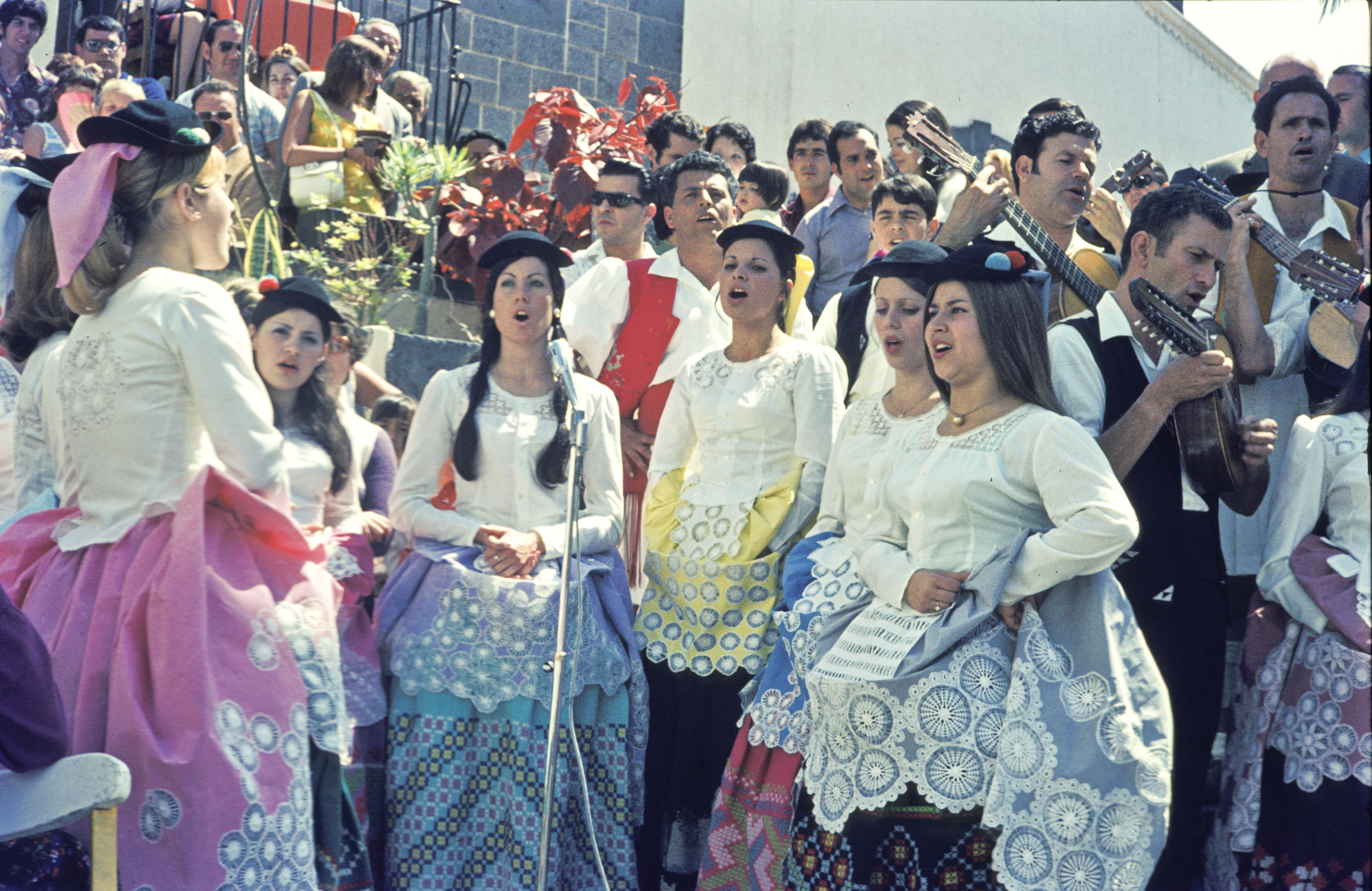
Canarian women singing in Gran Canaria, 1972

The islands were conquered by mostly Andalusians and some Castilians at the beginnings of the 15th century. In 1402, they began to subdue the native Guanche population and the Guanches were initially enslaved and gradually absorbed by the Spanish colonizers.

After subsequent settlement by Spaniards and other European peoples, mainly Portuguese, the remaining Guanches were gradually diluted by the settlers and their culture largely vanished. Alonso Fernández de Lugo, conqueror of Tenerife and La Palma, oversaw extensive immigration to these islands from the late 1490s to the 1520s from mainland Europe, and immigrants included Galicians, Castilians, Portuguese, Italians, Catalans, Basques and Flemings. At subsequent judicial enquiries, Fernández de Lugo was accused of favoring Genoese and Portuguese immigrants over Castilians.

== Americas ==
=== Argentina ===
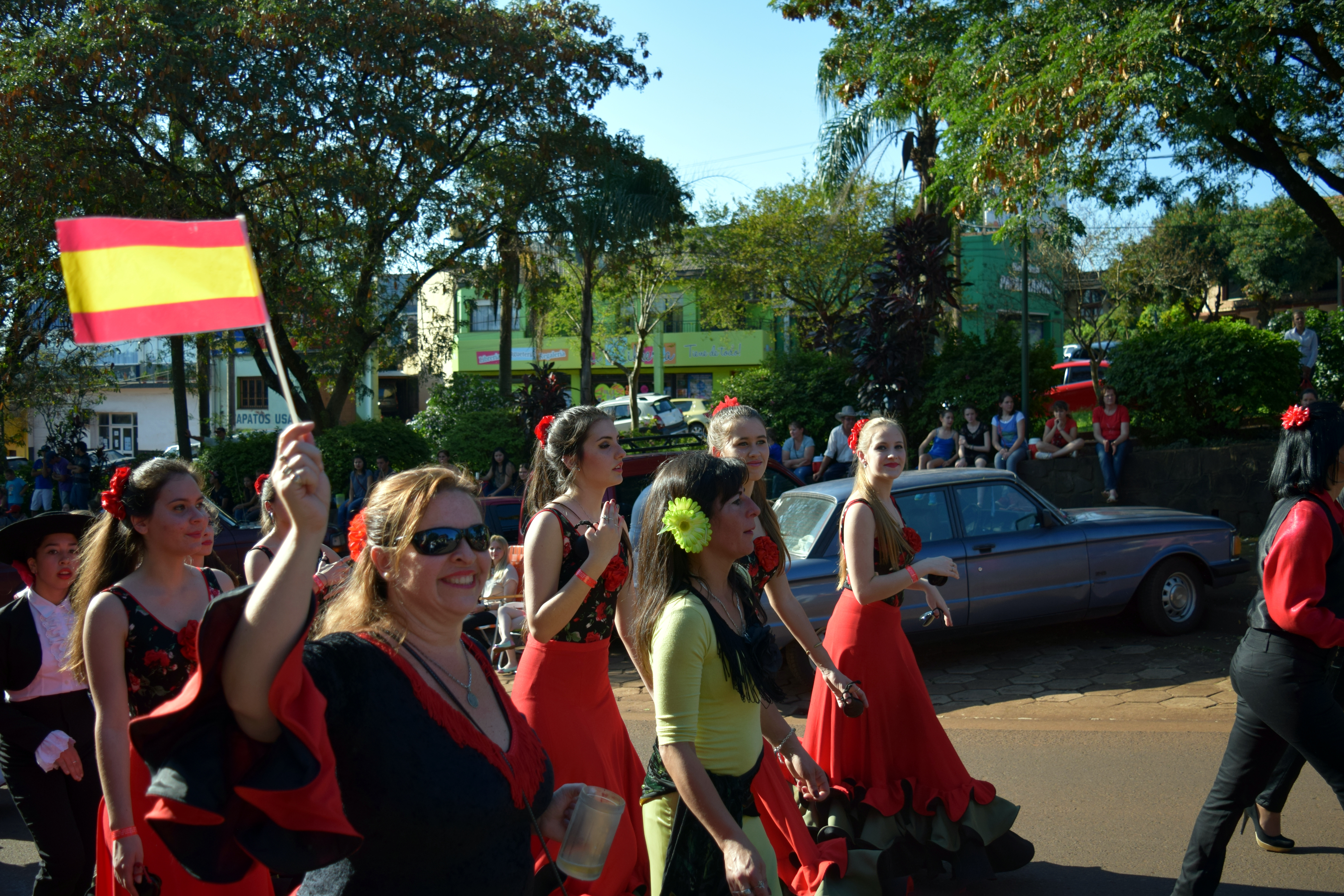
Immigrant's Festival in Misiones, Argentina

Spanish emigrant settlements were established in Argentina in the period before Argentina's independence from Spain, and again in larger numbers during the late 19th and early 20th centuries. Between the 15th and 19th centuries, the Spanish Empire was the sole colonial power in the territories that became Argentina after the 1816 Argentine Declaration of Independence. Thus, before 1816, a large number of the European settlers in Argentina were from Spain, and they conducted Spanish colonial administration, including religious affairs, government, and commercial business. A substantial Spanish-descended Criollo population gradually built up in the new cities, while some mixed with the indigenous populations (Mestizos), with the black slave population (Mulattoes), or with other European immigrants. Since a great part of the immigrants to Argentina before the mid-19th century were of Spanish descent, and the fact that a significant part of the late-19th century/early-20th century immigrants to Argentina were Spaniards, the vast majority of Argentinians are of mostly Spanish ancestry. However, this prevalence and the numerous shared cultural aspects between Argentina and Spain (the Spanish language, Roman Catholicism, Criollo/Hispanic traditions), massive immigration to Argentina at the turn of the 20th century involved a majority of non-Spanish peoples from all over Europe.

=== Bolivia ===
Bolivian people of European ancestry are predominantly descended from the people who emigrated from Spain beginning five hundred years ago.

In the official census in 1900, people who self-identified as "Blanco" (white) composed 12.72% or 231,088 people in the total population. This was the last time data on race was collected. There were 529 Italians, 420 Spaniards, 295 Germans, 279 French, 177 Austrians, 141 English and 23 Belgians living in Bolivia.

=== Brazil ===
Spanish immigration was the third largest among immigrant groups in Brazil; about 750,000 immigrants entered Brazil from Spanish ports (a number smaller only than that of Argentina and Cuba after the independence of Latin American countries). Brazilian censuses do not research "ethnic origins" or ancestry, which makes it very difficult to give accurate numbers of Brazilians of Spanish descent. In a 1998 research, the scope of which, however, is limited (it covers only six metropolitan regions), Brazilians claiming Spanish descent were 4.4% of Brazil's population.

=== Canada ===
The population of Canadians of Spanish descent is 342,040.

=== Chile ===
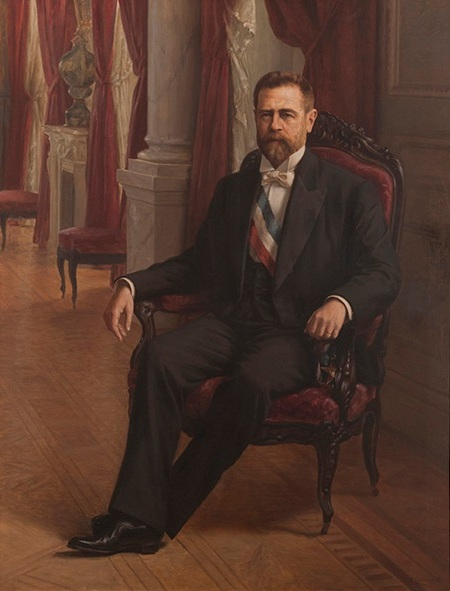
Chilean President Germán Riesco was the son of a Spanish merchant. His mother was the sister of President Federico Errázuriz Zañartu, of Basque descent.

The earliest European immigrants were Spanish colonisers who arrived in the 16th century. They came to form the majority of the population by the time of Chilean independence. They came mainly from Castile and Andalusia and formed the majority population. In the 18th and 19th centuries, many Basques from both Spain and France came to Chile where they integrated into the existing elites of Castilian origin. Other European nationalities then followed and also became rich and fused with each other and the Basque–Castilian elite to create modern Chilean culture. In the 20th century, there was an influx of refugees of the Spanish Civil War and Franco's regime. (see Winnipeg ship). They have kept their Spanish national identity and set up Spanish clubs throughout the country. The Spanish culture of the original settlers slowly evolved into Chilean folk culture, especially the huaso culture, and at the time of independence had abandoned national affiliation with Spain.

=== Colombia ===
Spanish emigration to Colombia began in the early 16th century and continues to the present day. About 500,000 Spaniards emigrated to Colombia during the colonial period. There are currently over 27,000 Spanish immigrants in Colombia.

=== Cuba ===
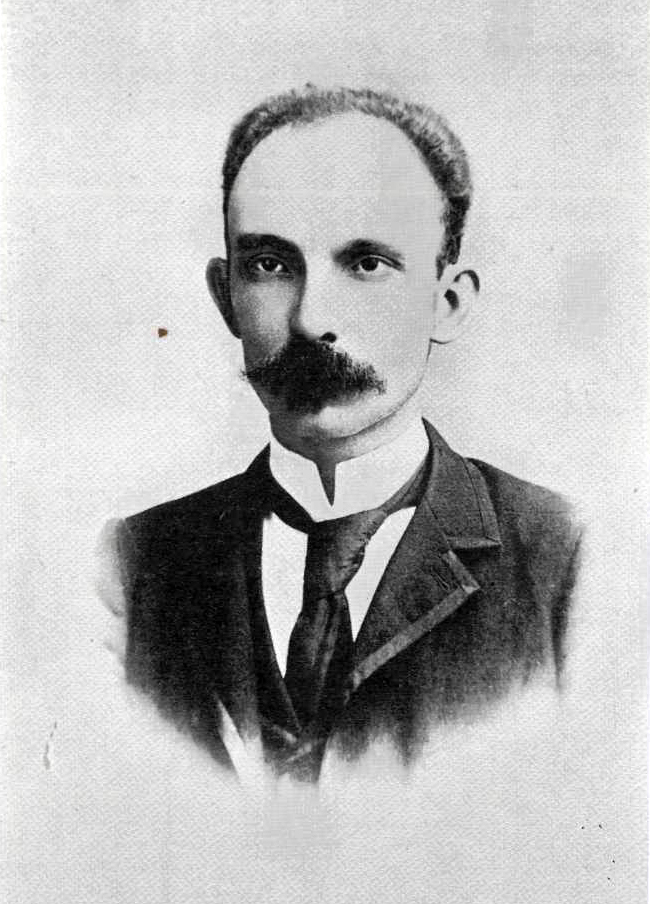
Poet José Martí, of Spanish parentage

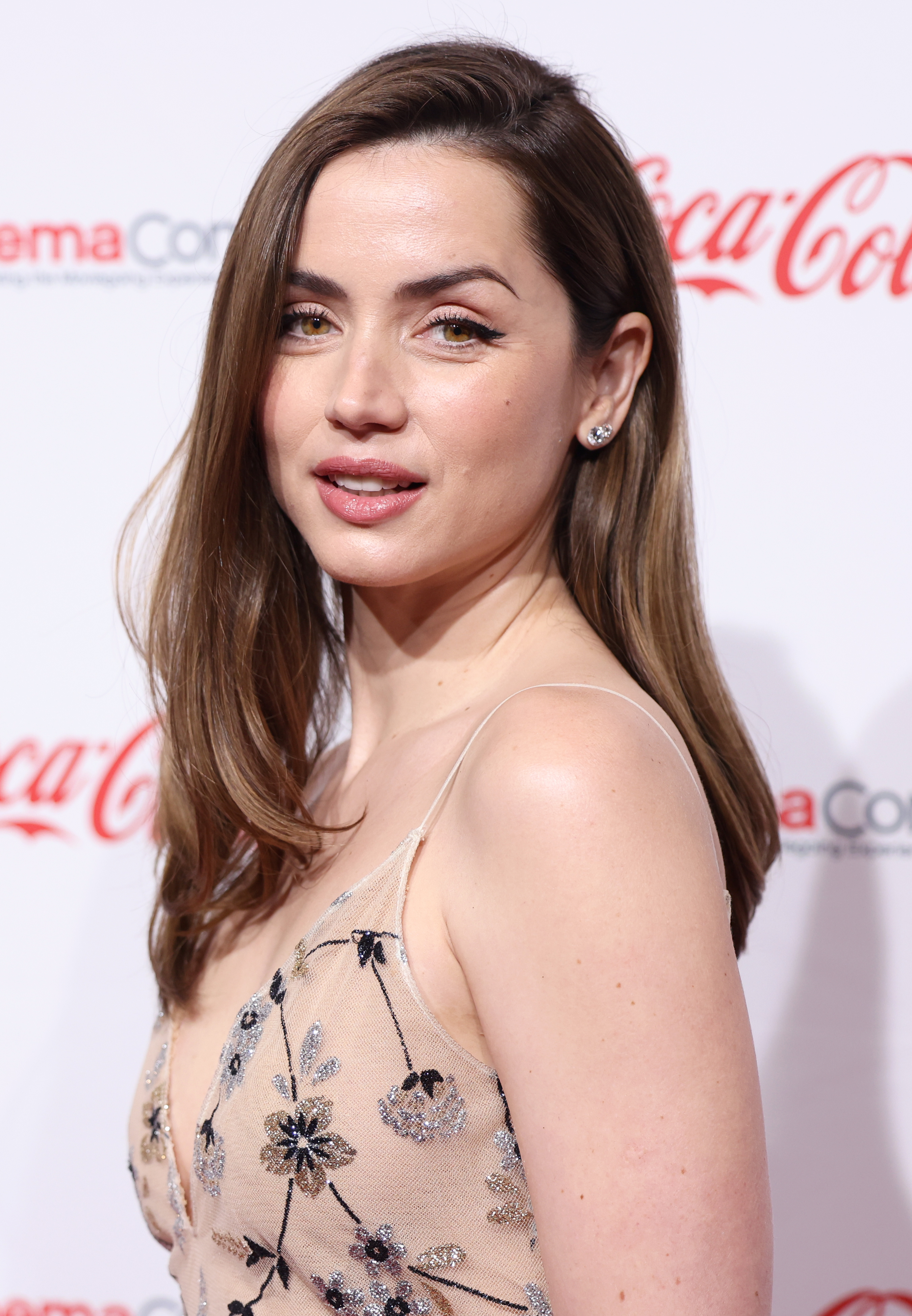
Cuban actress Ana de Armas of Spanish descent.

Spanish immigration to Cuba began in 1492, when Christopher Columbus first landed on the island. The first sighting of a Spanish boat approaching the island was on October 28, 1492, probably at Baracoa on the eastern point of the island. Christopher Columbus, on his first voyage to the Americas, sailed south from what is now the Bahamas to explore the northeast coast of Cuba and the northern coast of Hispaniola. Columbus found the island believing it to be a peninsula of the Asian mainland. In 1511, Diego Velázquez de Cuéllar set out with three ships and an army of 300 men from Santo Domingo to form the first Spanish settlement in Cuba, with orders from Spain to conquer the island. Most heritage comes from Canarians, Asturians, Galicians and Castilians. The native white population are nearly all descendants of the Spaniards.

==== 20th century ====
Other results show that between 1902 and 1931, 780,400 (60.8%) were from Spain, 197,600 (15.4%) from Haiti, 115,600 (9.0%) from Jamaica and 190,300 (14.8%) other countries.

In 2020, there were 147,617 people in Cuba with Spanish citizenship.

=== Dominican Republic ===
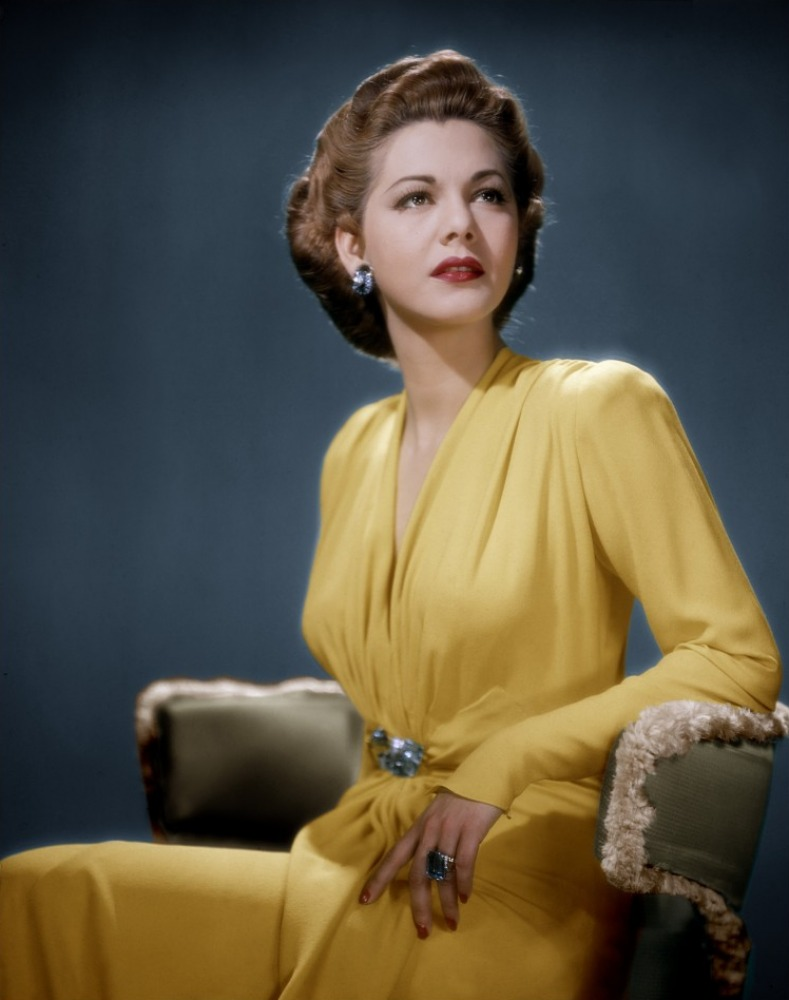
Maria Montez

The presence of whites in the Dominican Republic dates back to the founding of La Isabela, the first European settlement in the Americas, by Christopher Columbus in 1493 after the destruction of the Fuerte de la Navidad a year prior by the Cacique Caonabo. In 1510, there were 10,000 Spaniards in the colony of Santo Domingo, and it rose to over 20,000 in 1520. During the eighteenth century, there were French colonists that settled in many Spanish towns, particularly in Santiago de los Caballeros; by 1730 they accounted for 25% of the population. In 1718 a royal decree ordered the expulsion of the French from the colony of Santo Domingo. The Grand Mayor of Santiago, Antonio Pichardo Vinuesta, refused to obey the decree arguing that most of the Frenchmen had married local Spanish women and therefore, their expulsion would damage the economy of the Cibao Region. The Grand Mayor Pichardo was tried and imprisoned in the city of Santo Domingo, but the next year, the Council of the Indies reasoned in favor of Pichardo and issued a pardon to the French. In 1720–1721, a revolt in Santiago against a new tax on beef exports to the Saint Domingue colony, arose Frenchification fears in the Santo Domingo elite; Captain-General Fernando Constanzo, governor of the Santo Domingo, accused the elite of the Cibao of seeking to annex their provinces to France. After the failed plans of the Spanish monarchy to expel the French colonists, the monarchy decided to actively encourage the mass settlement of Spanish families in its territory. Over the nineteenth century, the Spanish colony of Santo Domingo was the subject of a mass migration of Spaniards, most of whom came from the Canary Islands. Due to this migration, it decreased the number of non-whites in the colony with the black population dropping to 12%, the mulatto population to 8%, and the castizos to 31%.

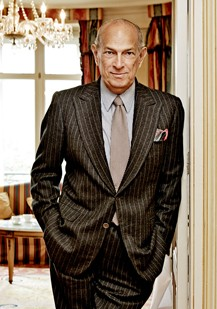
Oscar de la Renta

In present times the majority of the descendants of these Spaniards can be found in the North or Cibao Region of the Dominican Republic, representing a significant portion of the population in provinces such as Valverde, Espaillat, Hermanas Mirabal, La Vega and especially in Santiago de los Caballeros, but other places with important white minorities include Distrito Nacional, La Romana, Bonao, San Felipe de Puerto Plata, Punta Cana Village and Santa Cruz de Barahona. It is estimated that there are currently 26,880 Spanish nationals living in the Dominican Republic.

=== El Salvador ===
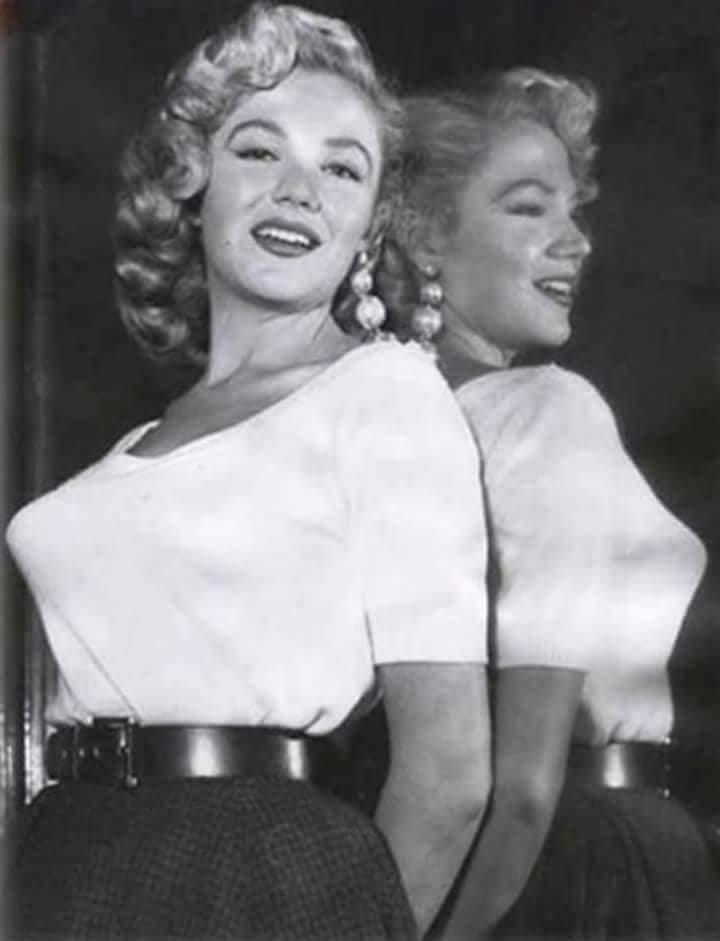
Maribel Arrieta

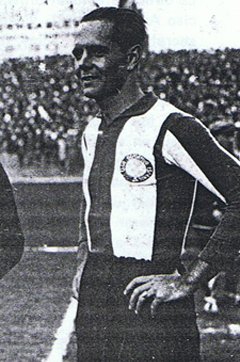
Ricardo Saprissa

After the discovery of the territory that is now El Salvador, the Spaniards began to conquer the territory. The east and north of El Salvador were easy to conquer due to the small indigenous population there, but the center-west had a lot of resistance; after the conquest, the Spanish were disappointed to learn that in El Salvador there was not as much gold, jewelry and silver as in other countries. They began to find another source for the economy, with including indigo, cocoa and livestock. With little manpower, the Spanish leaders of El Salvador sent for families from Galicia and Asturias to repopulate areas.

After independence and due to coffee and free immigration laws, Spaniards began to arrive in the country en masse. The vast majority came from Galicia and Asturias, and to a lesser extent from Andalusia, the Canary Islands, Catalonia and the Basque Country. It is estimated that between 1880 and 1930, 25,000 Spaniards moved to El Salvador.

The Spanish people represented the third largest group of immigrants in the country, only surpassed by the French and Italians.

=== Guatemala ===
The arrival of the Spaniards in Guatemala began in 1524 with the conquest of the territory under the command of Pedro de Alvarado. After the conquest and the colonial era, more people came to the country, not as conquerors, but to do business or daily activities. The Spanish embassy in Guatemala City reports some 9,311 Spaniards living in Guatemala in 2014. Early European immigrants from Guatemala were Spaniards who conquered the indigenous Mayan population in 1524. They ruled for almost 300 years. Although the Spanish conquest of Guatemala was primarily the result of its technical superiority, the Spaniards were helped by the Mayans who were already involved in a bitter internal struggle. After a period of political instability exacerbated by the collapse of the world market for indigo, each province seceded from the federation, starting with Costa Rica. The federation collapsed between 1838 and 1840, when Guatemala became an independent nation.

=== Mexico ===
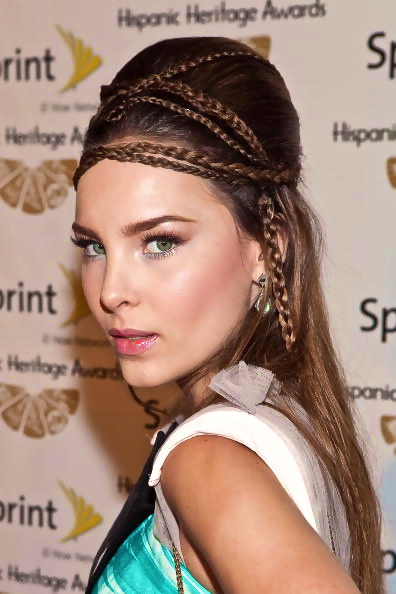
Belinda Peregrín

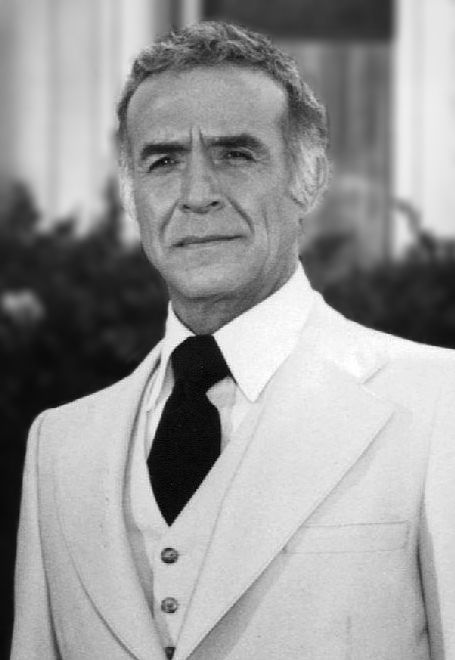
Ricardo Montalbán

Spanish immigration to Mexico began in 1519 and spans to the present day. The first Spanish settlement was established in February 1519, as a result of the landing of Hernán Cortés in the Yucatán Peninsula, accompanied by about 11 ships, 500 men, 13 horses and a small number of cannons. In March 1519, Cortés formally claimed the land for the Spanish crown, and the conquest of the Aztec Empire, a key event in the Spanish conquest of the region in general, was completed in 1521.

In the 16th century, following the military conquest of most of the new continent, perhaps 240,000 Spaniards entered American ports. They were joined by 450,000 in the next century. Since the conquest of Mexico, this region became the principal destination of Spanish colonial settlers in the 16th century. The first Spaniards who arrived in Mexico were soldiers and sailors from Extremadura, Andalusia and La Mancha after the conquest of the Americas. At the end of the 16th century both commoners and aristocrats from Spain migrated to Mexico.

=== Peru ===
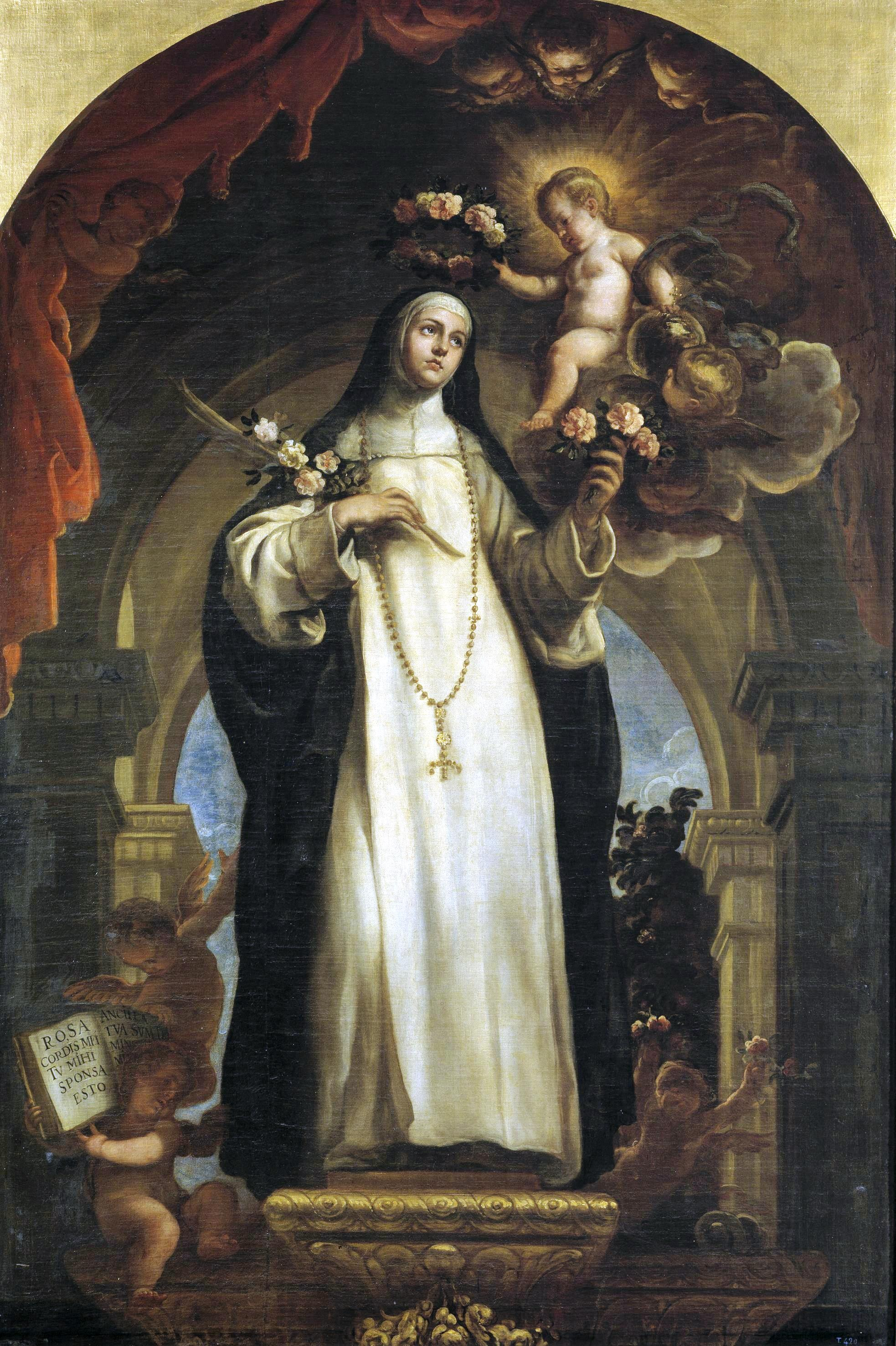
Saint Rose of Lima

The regions from which most Spanish immigrants originated were those of Extremadura, Castile, Galicia, Catalonia and Andalusia. Most of the colonial immigrants, in consequence, went from the southern regions of Spain to what now is considered the coastal Peruvian region. These immigrants generally departed from the ports of Cádiz or Seville and arrived in the ports of Callao, Mollendo and Pimentel. Many of these immigrants made a stopover in a Caribbean port before arriving in Peru. Before the development of the Panama Canal, ships went around Cape Horn to reach Peruvian ports. Although not many, a few travelers made their way from Europe to Peru via the Amazon River. These immigrants would seek passage on the many commercial ships going to retrieve rubber in Peru to bring back to Europe. These immigrants arrived at the river port of Iquitos. Almost all of them stayed there. These immigrants numbered no more than a few thousand. Around 44% of Peruvians are mestizos (people of mixed white and native Peruvian descent), and more than 7% are mulattoes, making a total of 51% with mixed ancestry.

=== Puerto Rico ===
Spanish immigration to Puerto Rico began in 1493 (continuing to 1898 as a part of the Spanish Empire) and continues to the present day. On September 25, 1493, Christopher Columbus set sail on his second voyage with 17 ships and 1,200–1,500 men from Cádiz, Spain. On November 19, 1493, he landed on the island, naming it San Juan Bautista in honor of Saint John the Baptist.

The first Spanish settlement, Caparra, was founded on August 8, 1508, by Juan Ponce de León, born in Valladolid, Spain, a lieutenant under Columbus, who later became the first governor of the island.

From the start of the conquest of Puerto Rico, Castilians ruled over the religious (Roman Catholic) and political life. Some came to the island for just a few years and then returned to Spain; however, many stayed.

Puerto Rico's founding family were Castilians (Ponce de León family). Their home was built in 1521 by Ponce de León but he died the same year, leaving Casa Blanca to his young son Luis Ponce de León. The original structure did not last long; two years after its construction, a hurricane destroyed it, and it was rebuilt by Ponce de León's son-in-law Juan Garcia Troche. The southern city of Ponce is named after Juan Ponce de León y Loayza, the great-grandson of Juan Ponce de León.

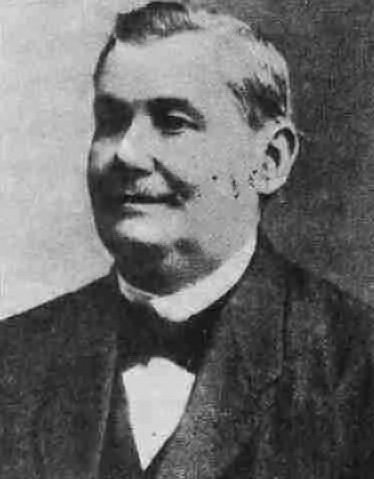
Manuel Fernández wrote La Borinqueña.

Immigration to the island caused the population to grow rapidly during the 19th century. In 1800 the population was 155,426 and the century ended with almost a million inhabitants (953,243), multiplying the population by about six times. The main component responsible was the Royal Decree of Graces of 1815 which led to immigrants from some 74 countries arriving. Included were hundreds of Corsican, French, Irish, German, Lebanese, Maltese and Portuguese families moving to the island. Some countries were represented by only a few (51 Chinese individuals, for example). The country that still sent the most people was Spain.

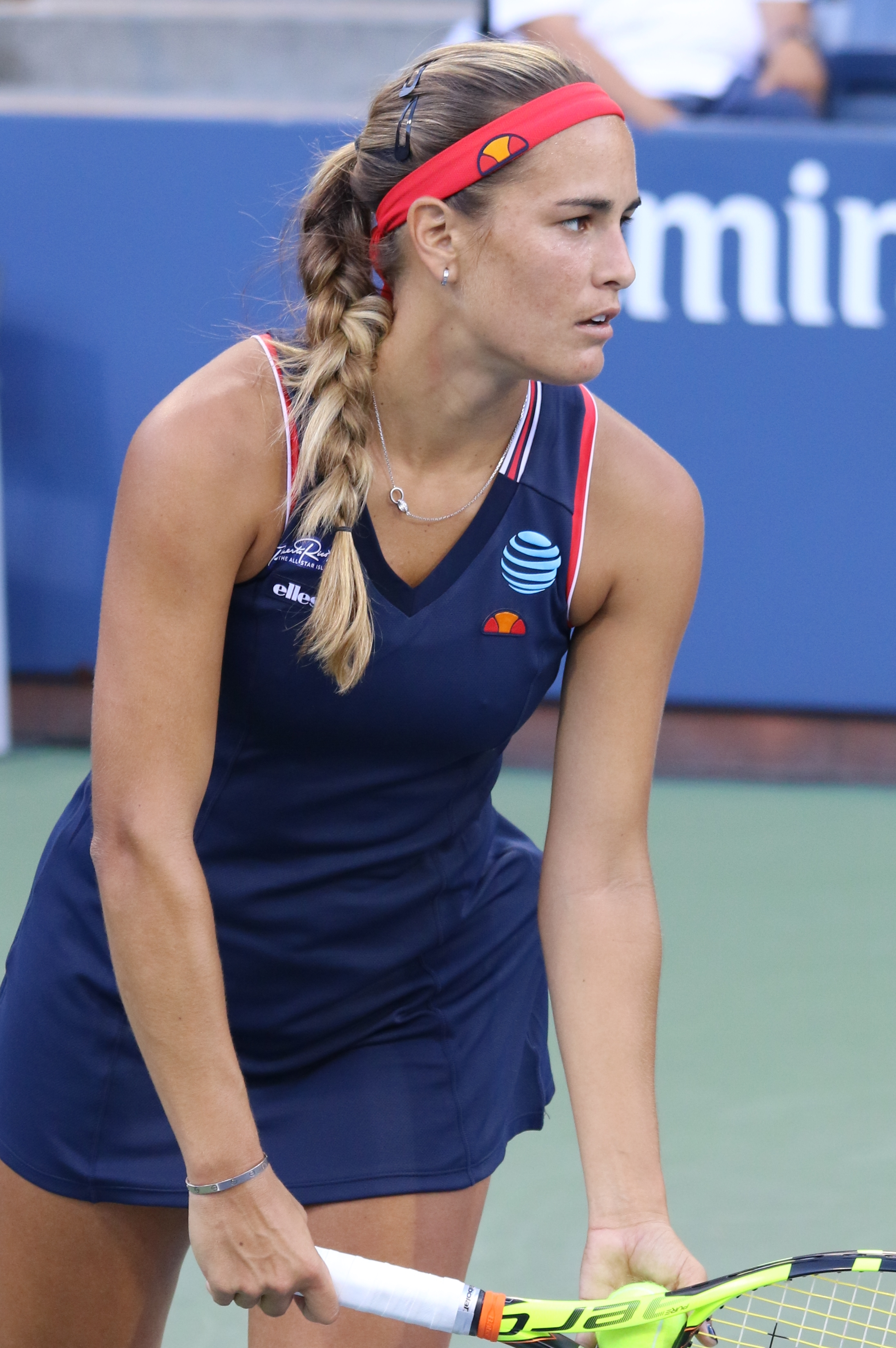
Tennis player Monica Puig in 2016.

From the start of colonization, other groups from Catalonia, Asturias, Galicia, and Majorca had also immigrated, although the Canarian people formed the basis. Once the 19th century came, things changed drastically. According to Puerto Rican authors such as Cifre de Loubriel who researched the immigration wave patterns made to the island, during the 19th century the greatest number of Spaniards that came to the island with their families were Catalans and Mallorcans from the nearby Mediterranean regions.

The second most common Spanish region with the largest numbers were the Galicians and Asturians, and the third regions were Canary Islanders, Basques and Andalusians. The Catalans, Galicians, Majorcans and Asturians would come with whole families most of the time. There were regions of the island that attracted some immigrants more than others which was mainly for political or economic reasons.

=== United States ===
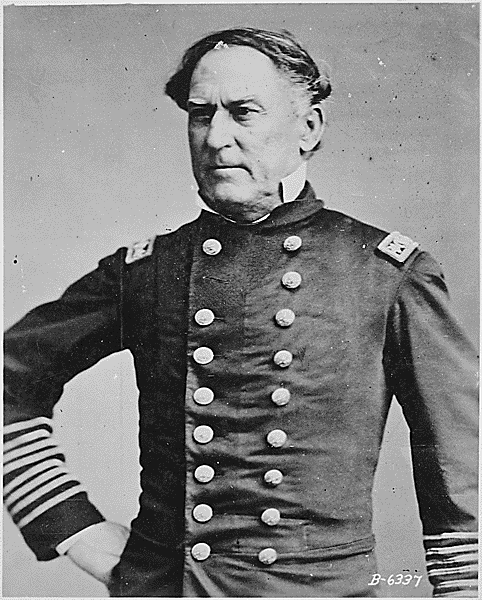
David Farragut, Union Admiral

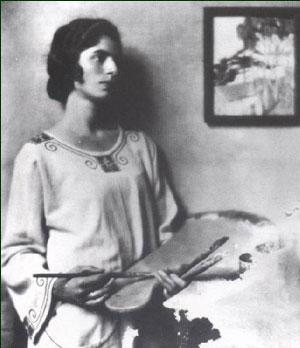
Mabel Alvarez, artist

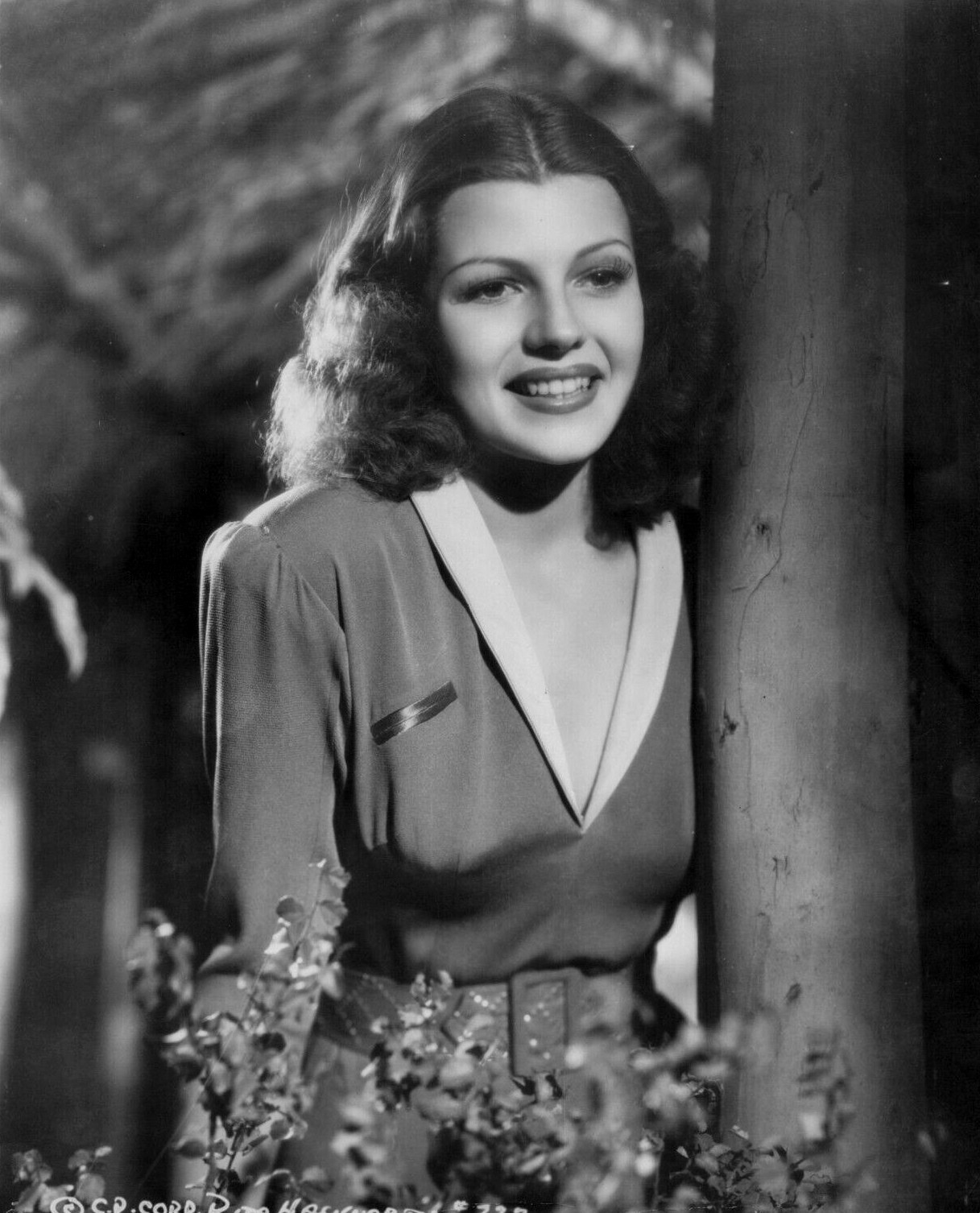
Rita Hayworth, actress

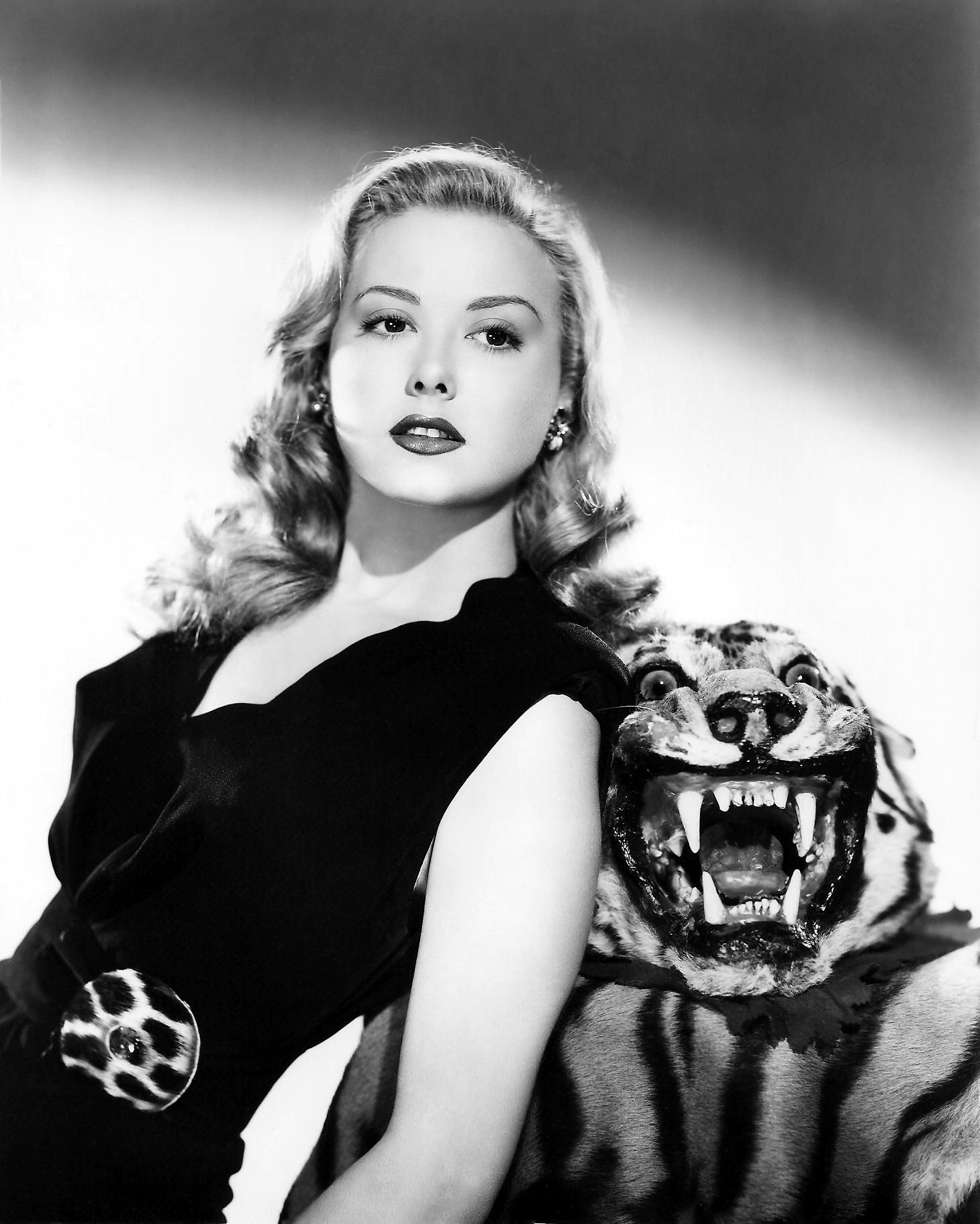
Adele Mara, actress

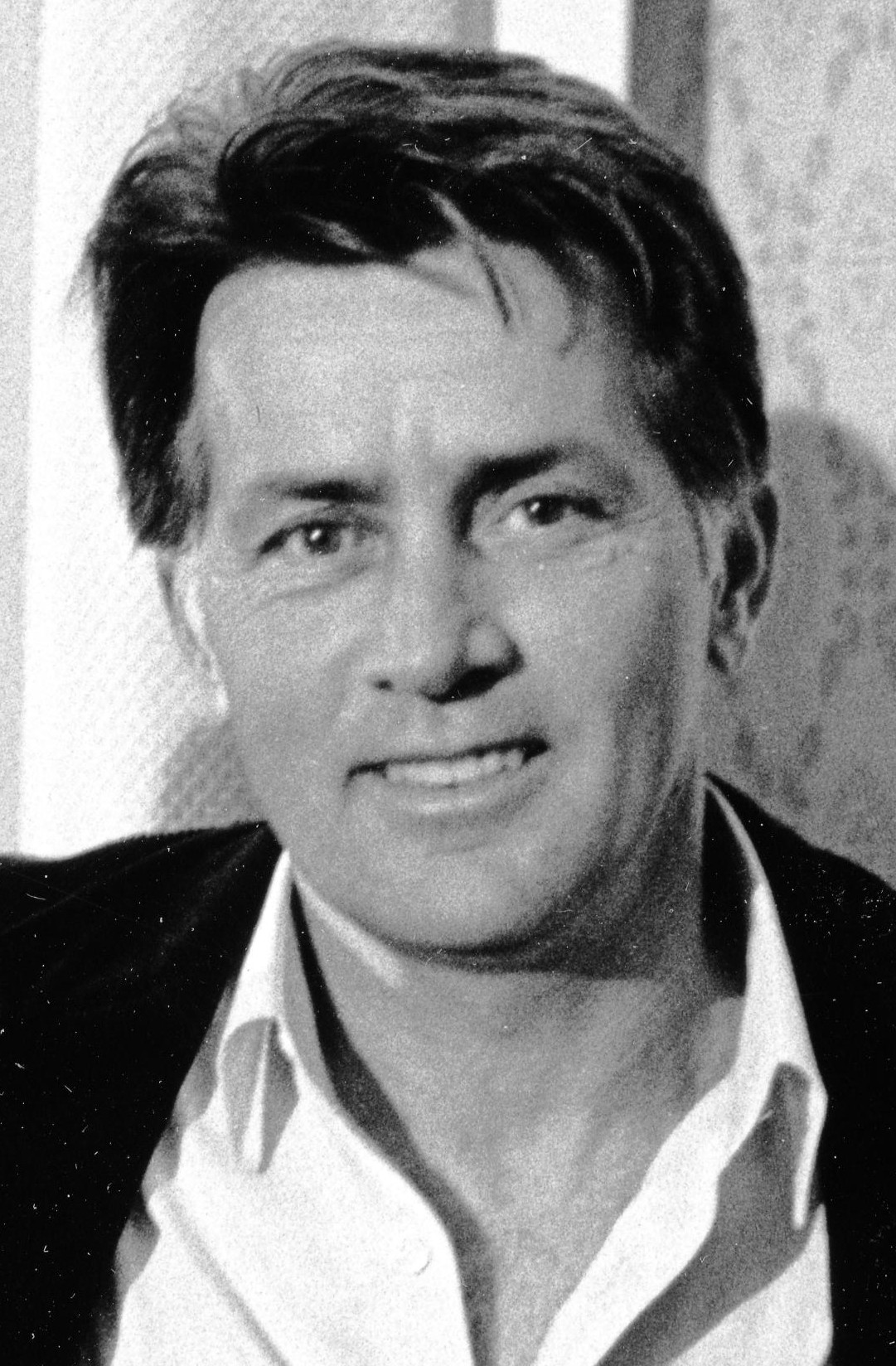
Martin Sheen, actor

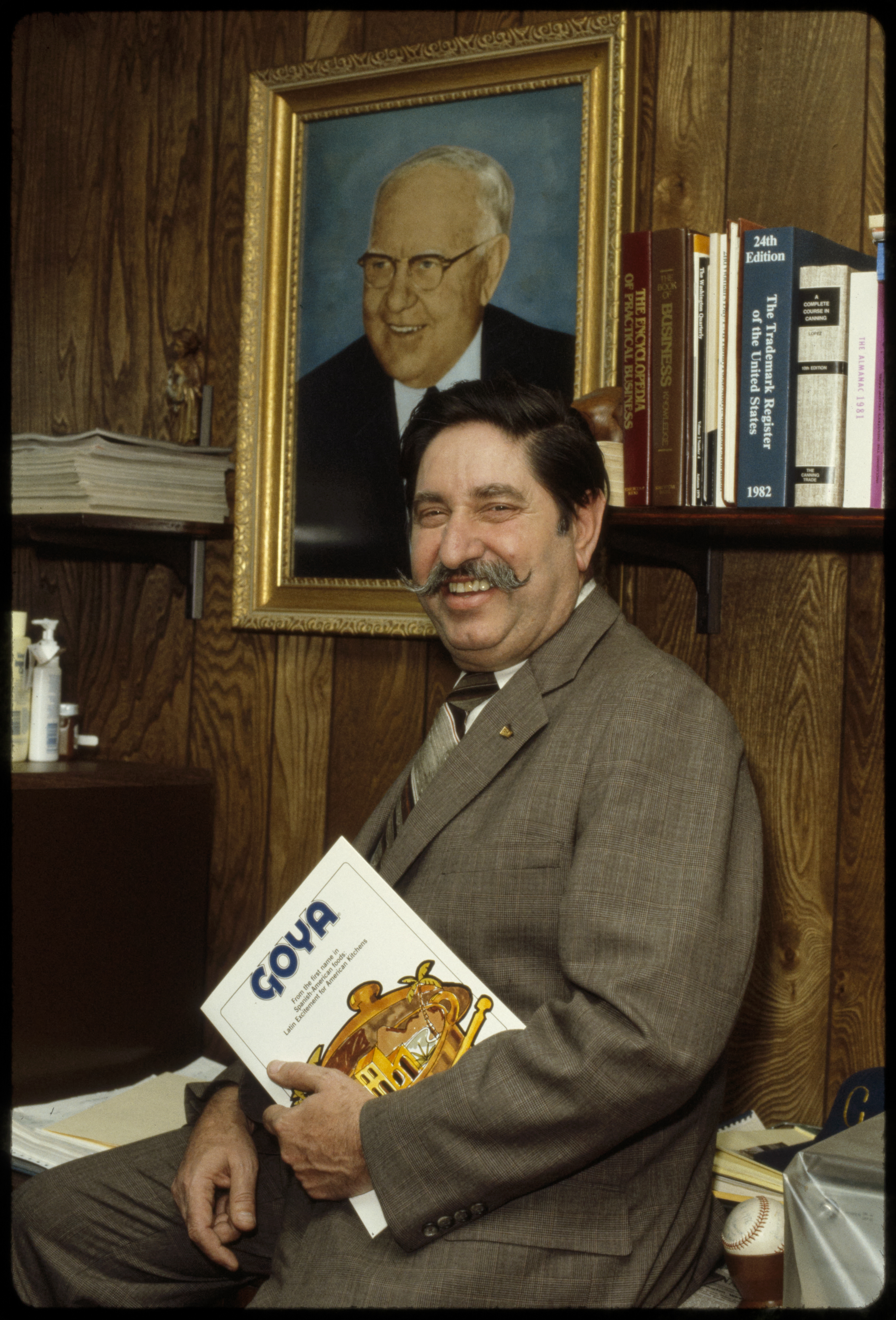
Joseph A. Unanue of Goya Foods

The Spanish are one of the longest-established European-American groups with a continuous presence in Florida since 1565 and are the eighth-largest (choosing the term "Spaniard") Hispanic group in the United States of America. In addition, a substantial proportion of Americans are also of Spanish descent indirectly via a Latin American country due to Spanish colonialism, although the term "Spanish-American" is used only to refer to Americans whose ancestry originates entirely or partially from Spain.

They are found in large concentrations in five major states from 1940 through the early twenty-first century. In 1940, the highest concentration of Spaniards were in New York (primarily New York City), followed by California, Florida, New Jersey and Pennsylvania.

Immigration to the United States from Spain was minimal but steady during the first half of the nineteenth century, with an increase during the 1850s and 1860s resulting from the social disruption of the Carlist civil wars. Much larger numbers of Spanish immigrants entered the country in the first quarter of the twentieth century—27,000 in the first decade and 68,000 in the second—due to the same circumstances of rural poverty and urban congestion that led other Europeans to emigrate in that period, as well as unpopular wars. The Spanish presence in the United States declined sharply between 1930 and 1940 from a total of 110,000 to 85,000. Many immigrants moved either back to Spain or to another country.

Spanish arrivals to the U.S.
Years	Arrivals	Years	Arrivals	Years	Arrivals
1820–1830	2,616	1891–1900	8,731	1961–1970	44,659
1831–1840	2,125	1901–1910	27,935	1971–1980	39,141
1841–1850	2,209	1911–1920	68,611	1981–1990	20,433
1851–1860	9,298	1921–1930	28,958	1991–2000	17,157
1861–1870	6,697	1931–1940	3,258	2001–2005	6,052
1871–1880	5,266	1941–1950	2,898		
1881–1890	4,419	1951–1960	7,894		
Total number of arrivals (183 years): 305,797

==== Number of Spanish Americans ====
In the 2013 American Community Survey, 759,781 people that reported "Spaniard", 652,884 were native USA-born and 106,897 were foreign-born. 65.3% of the foreign-born were born in Europe, 25.1% were born in Latin America, 8.3% from Asia, 0.6% in Northern America, 0.5% in Africa and 0.1% in Oceania.

- Spanish – 505,254
- Spanish American – 21,540

==== 2010 census ====
The 2010 census is the 23rd and most recent United States national census. National Census Day, the reference day used for the census, was April 1, 2010.

- Spaniard – 635,253

Statistics for those who self-identify as ethnic Spaniard, Spanish, Spanish American in the 2010 American Community Survey.

- Spaniard – 694,494
- Spanish – 482,072
- Spanish American – 48,810

=== Uruguay ===
Spanish settlement in Uruguay took place firstly in the period before Uruguay's independence from Spain (then known as Banda Oriental, a sparsely populated strip of land). Then again in large numbers during the late 19th and early 20th centuries. A substantial Spanish-descended Criollo population gradually built up, while some mixed with the indigenous populations (Mestizos), with the black slave population (Mulattoes), or with other European immigrants.

Since a great part of the immigrants to Uruguay before the mid-19th century were of Spanish descent, and the fact that a significant part of the late-19th century/early-20th century immigrants to Uruguay were Spaniards, the vast majority of Uruguayans are of mostly Spanish ancestry. However, this prevalence and the numerous shared cultural aspects between Uruguay and Spain (the Spanish language, Roman Catholicism, Criollo/Hispanic traditions), massive Immigration to Uruguay at the turn of the 20th century involved a majority of non-Spanish peoples from all over Europe.

=== Venezuela ===
Spanish immigration to Venezuela began in 1500 with the Spanish colonization of the Americas, and continued during Colonial Venezuela and, after independence in 1830, during the nineteenth century predominantly Canary Islanders. Their cultural impact was significant, influencing both the development of Castilian Spanish in the country as well as its cuisine and customs. Venezuela has perhaps the largest population of Canarian origin, and it is commonly said in the Canary Islands that "Venezuela is the eighth island of the Canary Islands." A substantial Spanish-descended Criollo population gradually built up, while some mixed with the indigenous populations (Mestizos), with the black slave population (Mulattoes), or with other European immigrants.Further immigration took place particularly following World War II during the Francoist dictatorship.

As of December 2014, there are more 231,833 anish citizens in Venezuela. As of January 2016, that figure reduced to 188,025 according to the spanish National Statistics Institute. In the same study, Venezuela ranked fourth in total immigration. One year later, immigration the country slowed down considerably.

== Asia ==
=== Former Spanish East Indies ===
A Spanish Filipino is any citizen or resident of the Philippines who is of Spanish ancestral origin.

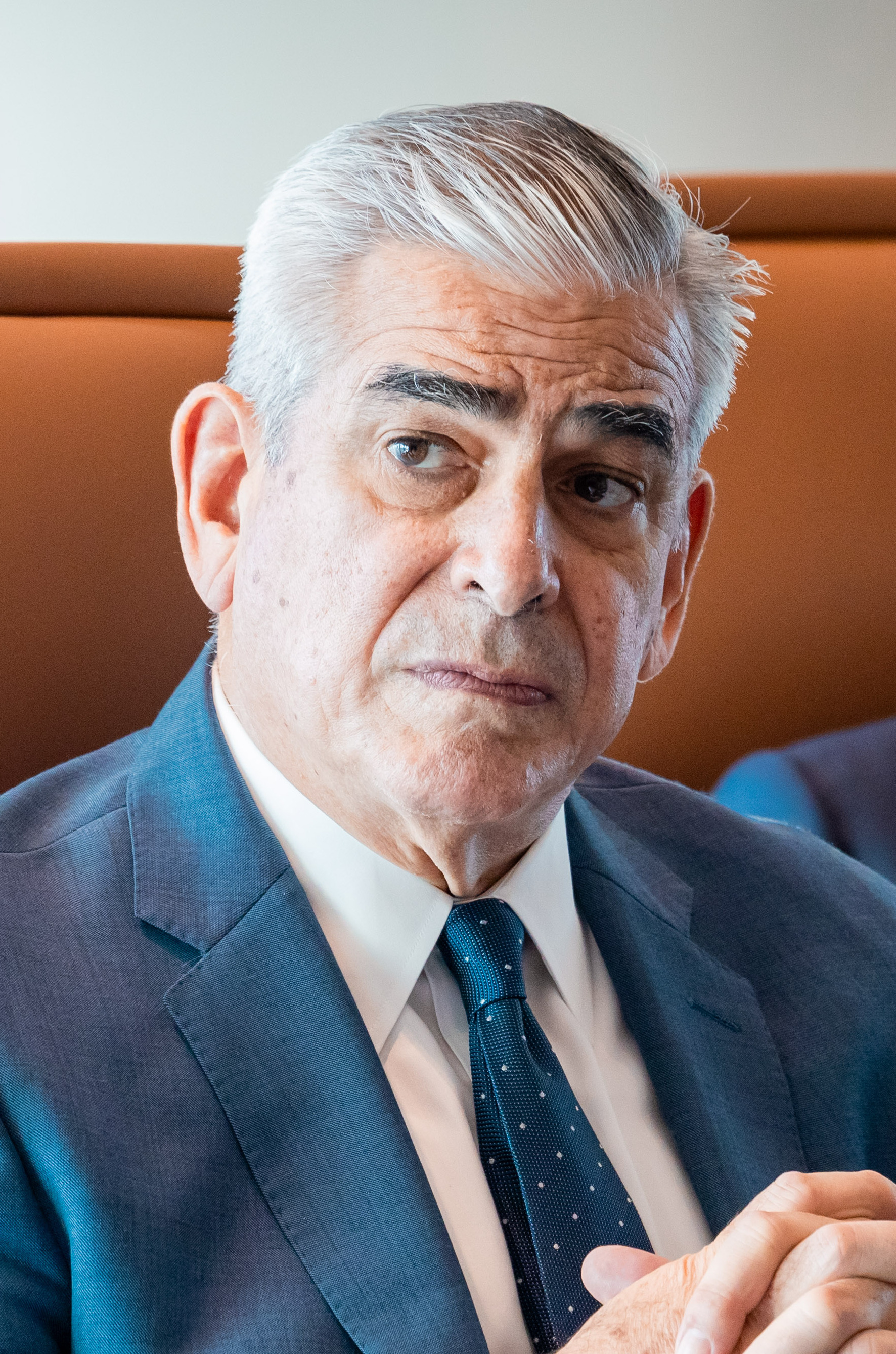
Jaime Augusto Zobel de Ayala, chairman of Ayala Corporation of Spanish and German descent.

Filipinos of Spanish descent trace part of their ancestry to Spain directly or via Mexico, which ruled the country for the Spanish crown for 200 years from Mexico City. They are mostly descendants of the migrants to the Spanish East Indies now known as the Philippines. For three centuries, between 1565 and 1898, Mexicans of Spanish descent, Spaniards, and sometimes other Latin Americans sailed to and from the Spanish East Indies as government officials, soldiers, priests, settlers, traders, sailors and adventurers in the Manila-Acapulco Galleon, assisting Spain in its trade between Europe and Latin America (Spanish America); and Latin America and China.

According to the 2020 Philippine census, there were 4,952 Filipinos who self-identified as Spanish.

== Europe ==
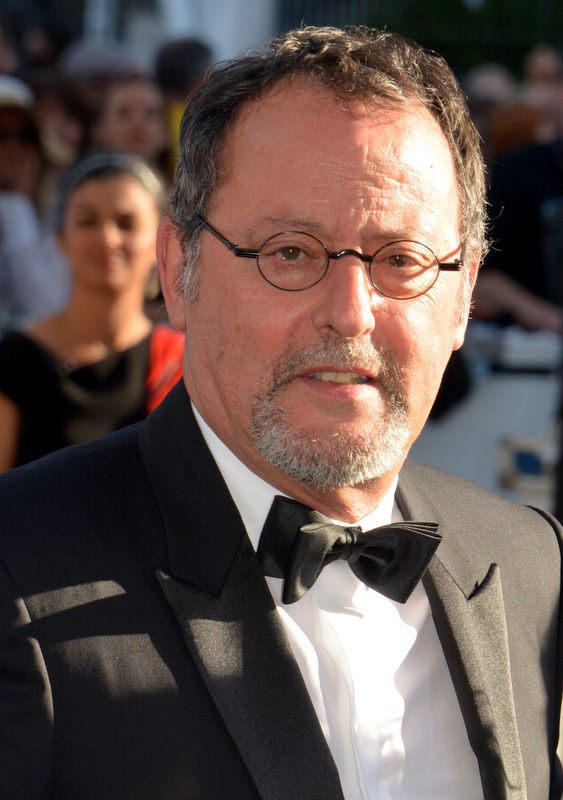
Actor Jean Reno was born in Casablanca, French Morocco, to Spanish Andalusian parents.

=== France ===
French people of Spanish descent is any citizen or resident of France who is of Spanish ancestral origin. Famous people of Spanish origin have included Louis de Funès, Eric Cantona, Anne Hidalgo, Diego Buñuel, Luis Fernández, Jean Reno, Olivier Martinez, Paco Rabanne, Mathieu Valbuena, Manuel Amoros, Raymond Domenech, Albert Camus and Manuel Valls.

=== Germany ===
Germans of Spanish descent is any citizen or resident of Germany who is of Spanish ancestral origin. Between 1960 and 1973, up to 600,000 Spaniards emigrated to Germany. Notable Spaniards in Germany include Mario Gómez, Heinz-Harald Frentzen, Gonzalo Castro, Francisco Copado, Curro Torres, Enrique Sánchez Lansch, Marc Gallego, Stefan Ortega, Joselu, Daniel Brühl, Oscar Corrochano, and Cristian Fiel.

=== Netherlands ===
Dutch people of Spanish descent is any citizen or resident of the Netherlands who is of Spanish ancestral origin. In 1965, more than 11,000 Spaniards and almost 3,000 Italians immigrated to the Netherlands. Only a small part of these Southern European migrants stayed in the Netherlands permanently. Of the Spanish immigrants who came to the Netherlands in the years 1964–1973, three quarters had left again ten years later (among Italians: 60%). In the recession year of 1967, more Spaniards left (7,000) than immigrated (2,500). Many of the immigrants came to work as guest workers in the metal industry in the port of Rotterdam, the Royal Hoogovens in IJmuiden, at Philips in Eindhoven, the textile industry in Twente and in the west of North Brabant and in the meat processing industry in the east of North-Brabant. Notable Spaniards in the Netherlands include Juan Viedma, Javier Guzman, Emilio Guzman, Rafael van der Vaart, Yolanthe Cabau, Hans Mulder, Jesjua Angoy-Cruyff, Kevin Gomez Nieto, Marco Asensio, and Enric Llansana.

=== Switzerland ===
Swiss of Spanish descent is any citizen or resident of Switzerland who is of Spanish ancestral origin. Famous Spaniards in Switzerland include: Ricardo Cabanas, Ricardo Rodríguez, Philippe Senderos, Luis Cembranos, Gerardo Seoane, Riccardo Meili, Raphael Diaz, Vincent Perez.

=== United Kingdom ===
British of Spanish descent is any citizen or resident of the United Kingdom who is of Spanish ancestral origin. Famous Spaniards in the United Kingdom include: John Galliano, Patrick Murray, Geri Halliwell, John Garcia Thompson, Roland Orzabal, Michael Portillo, Lita Roza, Mary I, Edward II, Jay Rodriguez.

== Oceania ==
=== Australia ===
There are approximately 78,271 Australians of Spanish descent, most of which reside within the major cities of Sydney and Melbourne, with lesser numbers in Brisbane and Perth. Of these, according to the 2006 Australian census, 12,276 were born in Spain.

=== New Zealand ===
There are approximately 3,162 New Zealanders who are of full or partial Spanish descent, most of whom reside within the major cities of Auckland and Wellington.

== See also ==
- Indiano, denomination for Spanish emigrants to the Americas.
