= Caminando Fronteras =

European aid organization defending migrant rights

Caminando Fronteras is a non-governmental organization which defends the rights of migrants on the Euro-African Western Border. Founded in 2002, it works from a transnational, transcultural, anti-racist, and feminist perspective, denouncing borders as spaces of impunity and supporting the rights of people on the move.

Its founder, and one of its most prominent members, is the human rights defender Helena Maleno.

== Work ==
=== Defense of the 'Right to Life' ===
The organization has a 24/7/365 alert line for migrants whose lives are in danger at sea. After receiving calls from the people at risk themselves or, in many cases, from their family members or friends, Caminando Fronteras passes on the alert to rescue services in neighboring countries, verifying information, exerting media pressure, and ensuring the protection of the right to life at sea. This tool has managed to save the lives of "more than 100,000 people in fourteen years," as stated on its website.

=== Identification of victims and identification of perpetrators ===
The Collective promotes actions to identify victims at the borders: visits to morgues, information gathering and cross-referencing, DNA testing, search campaigns for missing persons, and on-site investigations are some of the aspects of an identification and reparation process which are abandoned by States when it comes to migrants. That is why Caminando Fronteras covers this work as a civil society organization, while also carrying out political advocacy work to identify perpetrators: arms and immigration control companies, States, and criminal networks responsible for deaths and disappearances at the borders.

=== Support for families of border victims ===
For the families of people killed and/or disappeared at the Euro-African Western Border, there is no institutional avenue available to address their loss: States deny the families of migrants the right to Truth, Justice, Reparation and Non-Repetition. To restore these rights, the organization provides comprehensive support to the families of victims at the borders, both in individual and collective cases, in a process called "transforming pain into Justice." The reconstruction of the facts of the deaths, the opening of judicial proceedings, the provision of tools for grieving and psychosocial support are fundamental axes of this process.

=== State criminalization and international recognition ===
Caminando Fronteras has repeatedly denounced the personal violence suffered by its main spokesperson, Helena Maleno. Assassination attempts, physical attacks, death threats, and police set-ups are some of the situations Maleno has faced as a human rights defender, a source of discomfort for states, arms companies, and criminal networks.

== Awards ==
Together with its spokesperson, Helena Maleno, the Collective has been awarded the following prizes:

- 2014 Human Rights Award from the Progressive Union of Prosecutors
- 2015 Human Rights Award from the General Council of the Spanish Bar Association
- Distinction for the Defense of the Rights of Migrant Women from the Andalusian Women's Institute (2016)
- Distinction for the Defense of the Rights of Women Victims of Trafficking from the Amaranta Foundation (2017).
- Premio Extremadura Global 2021 del Gobierno de la Junta de Extremadura (2021).
- Reconocimiento Internacional Derechos Humanos ACAMPA 2022.
- Premio Humanizar 2022 del Centro Español de Humanización de la Salud.
- Premio Desalambre de Eldiario.es (2023)
- Premios Blas Infante (2025)
- 2025 International Hrant Dink Award.

== Publications ==
- Informe de análisis de hechos y recopilación de testimonios de la Tragedia de Tarajal (tr. "Fact analysis report and collection of testimonies of the Tarajal Tragedy") (2014)
- Informe 'Tras la Frontera' (tr. " 'Behind the Border' Report") (2016)
- Informe 'Vida en la Necrofrontera' (tr. " Report 'Life in the Necrofrontera'") (2019)

== See also ==
- Alarm-Phone-Initiative
