= African immigration to Latin America =

African immigrants to Latin America include citizens and residents of countries in Latin America who were born in, or with recent ancestors from Africa. This excludes descendants of people who were forcibly transported to the Americas through the Atlantic slave trade.

Yale University published a report on the increasing immigration of people from the African continent to countries in Latin America. This report explains this trend in immigration as being due to the stricter border controls and immigration policies by countries across Europe. This report also cites rises in xenophobic sentiment across Europe as a reason for increased migration of African immigrants from Africa to Latin America. Besides that, another important reason for the increase in the arrival of people from West Africa, especially those from Senegal, in Brazil had to do with the migration opportunities created in 2014 during the FIFA World Cup in Brazil and in 2016 during the Summer Olympics held in Rio de Janeiro, Brazil.

Brazil is cited as having the largest black population of any country outside of Africa. Brazil's and most of Latin America's friendly immigration policies attract migration from people from the African countries who seek to be integrated into society.

== History ==
Latin America Net Migration

During the Portuguese Colonial War and Angolan and Mozambican Civil Wars, some Angolans and Mozambicans fled to Brazil and became citizens.

After the end of both wars, most migration across the Atlantic to Latin America was from West Africa, often due to political and socioeconomic instability, and a trend toward the tightening of border security in the European Union in the 1990s and first decade of the 21st century. The process of settlement and citizenship acquisition, however, has been eased for these immigrants due to the presence of pre-existing Black diaspora populations in such countries as Brazil, which has minimized local trends towards xenophobia or colorism.

During the latter half of the 2010s and the early 2020s, a transit migration phenomenon from Africa to Latin America has been documented, with the intent of reaching the United States or Canada, prompted by violent and precarious conditions in their countries of origin. Recent migratory flows typically commence with flights to Brazil or Ecuador. Subsequently, on their northward journey, migrants traverse the Darién Gap, a tropical forest situated on the border between Colombia and Panama, which constitutes the most perilous segment of their journey. The passage through Central America is relatively swift; however, upon crossing Mexico's southern border via the city of Tapachula, they become entrapped in a protracted administrative process that can extend for months. The majority of migrants abandon this process and proceed undocumented towards Mexico's northern border; some even cross into the United States illegally, anticipating apprehension and the opportunity to apply for asylum while in detention.

In recent years, it has been estimated by the United Nations University Center for Policy Research (UNU) that African immigration to Latin America has drastically increased in the past decade. The UNU presents an 8,000% increase in African asylum seekers from 2020 to 2024, which can indicate a greater number of immigrants in total.

== By country ==
=== Brazil ===
- Brazil - 3000-4000 African immigrants (including 2000 immigrants from Nigeria South Africa)

==== Background ====
In the period between the late 19th century and the early 20th century, Brazilian immigration policy became restrictive of migration by populations from Africa in an effort to shift the population's racial demographic from being diverse to a white majority one. These policies worked by encouraging migration of people of European descent and making it difficult for people of African descent to enter the country. This same stance was imposed on Asians. These policies differed sharply from policies in the United States that enforced segregation and racial inequality. Brazil's policies were rooted in its history of interracial blending and relationships between the native people of Brazil, Europeans, and Africans.

==== Sociodemographic Data ====
In a study published in SciELO Brazil done by professors Maria Cecília Leite de Moraes, Linda Concita Nunes Araújo, and Climene Laura de Camargo in São Paulo, 33 female African immigrants, mostly from Angola, were surveyed and it was found that the most common reasons for their emigration from their home countries were Economic issues (21.3%) and War (15.2%). Of these 33 women, 45% report feeling discriminated against after immigrating to Brazil despite the increase in immigration.

== See also ==
- Emigration from Africa
- African immigration to Europe
- African immigration to Canada
- African immigration to the United States
- Migrants' African routes
