= Migrants' African routes =

Routes from tropical Africa to Europe

Migrants' routes encompass the primary geographical routes from tropical Africa to Europe, which individuals undertake in search of residence and employment opportunities not available in their home countries. While Europe remains the predominant destination for most migrants, alternative routes also direct migrants towards South Africa, the Middle East, and Asia. The routes are monitored by, among others, the Spanish NGO Caminando Fronteras (lit. "Walking Borders"), the European group InfoMigrants and the United Nations

Map of migration routes to North Africa and Europe from West Africa.

== Background ==
Main migrant routes in the Mediterranean and people who lost their lives there (2014)

For many migrants attempting to navigate complex security, criminal, or corrupt systems along African borders, this journey is a human odyssey that often leaves little evidence or witnesses. The expedition involves substantial financial costs (individuals earning less than 1 Euro per day may spend thousands of Euros on the journey) and poses significant dangers. Mortality rates during desert crossings, sea voyages, and other stages represent a considerable threat. In 2018, the United Nations High Commissioner for Refugees (UNHCR) reported that at least one in 5 migrants died or disappeared while attempting to cross the Mediterranean. The primary motivations for embarking on this journey are often economic, driven by the search for improved living conditions. However, cultural and symbolic factors also play a role (e.g., in Sub-Saharan Africa, the journey can serve as an alternative rite of passage). Some are displaced or driven out of their home countries by famines, wars, and political or social unrest.

A significant number of African migrants lack European travel visas, leading them to journey northward along trans-Saharan routes and undertake perilous boat voyages across sea barriers. 10% of the total migratory flow occurs via sea routes.

Many African migrants do not successfully progress beyond the coastal regions of North Africa, often concluding their journeys within Mediterranean coastal countries (particularly Libya and the Maghreb, which collectively house nearly 2 million irregular migrants).

A minority of migrants (estimated between 10 and 15%) continue their journey across the Mediterranean towards Europe, braving the hazards of open-sea crossings in small boats. The steady influx of migrants has led to opposition and animosity from North African governments, resulting in repressive measures and forced repatriations. Due to the absence of repatriation agreements, most deportations transpire via southern borders with neighboring countries (e.g., Rosso near the Mauritania-Senegal border, Oujda near the Morocco-Algeria border, Tinzouatine and In Guezzam near the Algeria-Mali and Algeria-Niger borders).

New migration routes have emerged directly from Sub-Saharan countries (such as Senegal, Gambia, and the Guinea coast), creating alternative entry paths and migration strategies. This phenomenon has contributed to a partial shift in migrants' origins, with fewer migrants hailing from Sub-Saharan Africa and an increase from Egypt and Morocco. Nonetheless, this shift has not alleviated the migratory pressure from Libya, which remains a significant source of migration towards Italy and a primary departure point for those seeking the European dream.

The Sub-Saharan African migratory process is evolving due to shifts in control and repression measures, leading to the gradual emergence of new maritime and overland routes. These routes are typically facilitated by criminal organizations and local intermediaries colluding with law enforcement authorities.

== Overland routes from Agadez ==
=== Agadez - Dirkou - Sabha ===
The initial migratory route spans from Agadez and Dirkou in Niger to the Sabha oasis in Libya, tracing an old caravan trail that gained prominence in the 1990s. This surge in migration to Libya followed political measures enacted by Muammar Gaddafi in 1992, which aimed to open borders.

In recent years, Libya's migration policy has focused on countering the Western embargo and utilizing Southern foreign labor to address productivity shortages, particularly in agriculture and construction. However, these efforts faced setbacks due to xenophobic reactions in 2000 in cities like Tripoli and Zawiya.

Since then, Libya, with a substantial immigrant population among local countries (around 1.5 million immigrants among 5.5 million inhabitants, mainly concentrated in coastal regions), has aimed to restrict and suppress irregular migration. Despite ongoing human rights violations, Libya's approach has garnered support from European countries through agreements aimed at controlling irregular migration, notably with Italy.

Following a widely reported incident in March 2009 involving the drowning of over 200 migrants traveling from Libya to Europe, Libyan Interior Minister Abdelfattah Yunis al-Obeidi announced a collaboration with Nigerien Interior Minister Albadé Abouba to conduct joint patrols and curb migrant flows from Niger into Libya. The majority of Sub-Saharan migrants traveling through Libya follow this route.

=== Agadez - Arlit - Bamako - Gao - Tamanrasset ===
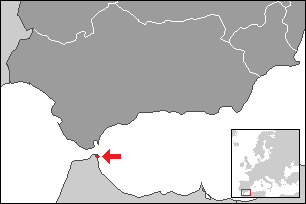
Location of Ceuta

Location of Melilla

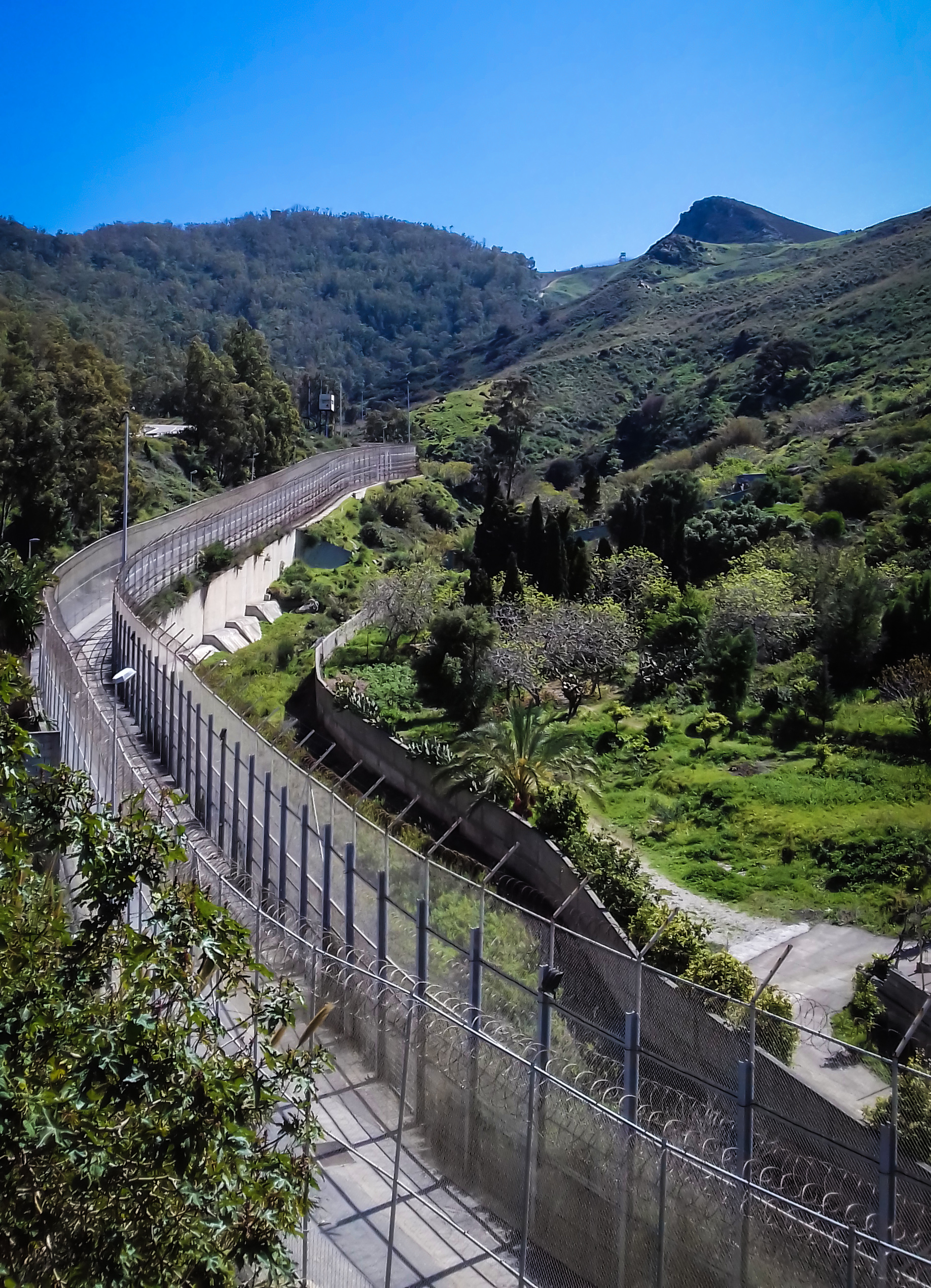
The Ceuta-Morocco border fence, seen from Ceuta

A new westward-oriented route emerged from 2000 onward, encompassing migrants from Sub-Saharan Africa, particularly regions afflicted by conflicts and crises (e.g., Nigeria, Côte d'Ivoire, Liberia, Mali, Burkina Faso, Niger, Central African Republic, Cameroon, etc.), as well as a smaller stream from Central Asia.

Migrants have revived ancient Sub-Saharan caravan networks traversed for centuries by nomadic groups like the Tuareg in Mali, Niger, and Algeria.

The new routes taken by caravans have reshaped urban landscapes in cities such as Agadez and Arlit in Niger, Bamako and Gao in Mali, and Tamanrasset in Algeria, where migrants and individuals facilitating illegal migration activities are prevalent. From these points, migrants primarily head toward Maghnia on the Moroccan border and the Spanish enclaves of Ceuta and Melilla on the coast. Here, they persistently attempt to overcome city barriers or reach nearby locations along the Algerian and Tunisian coasts. Between 2000 and 2005, migratory pressure in Morocco surged, peaking in the summer and autumn of 2005. During this period, hundreds of migrants attempted to breach the barriers of the Spanish enclaves (Ceuta and Melilla), resulting in numerous fatalities and injuries.

== Atlantic routes ==
Sea voyages attempted by migrants from the west coast of Africa include the destinations of Cape Verde (some 600km offshore), the Canary Islands (an autonomous community of Spain, 100km offshore), and mainland Europe (requiring a passage past the Strait of Gibraltar). In 2024, while irregular migration to Europe as a whole decreased by 38%, irregular migration via the 'Western African route' increased by 18%; the year saw a record number of deaths on this route, with 10,457 people dead or missing as a results of attempts to reach Spain via 'irregular maritime routes'.

=== Cape Verde ===
In August 2023, 63 persons died in the 2023 Cape Verde migrant boat disaster.

=== Canary Islands ===
The renewed cooperation between Madrid and Rabat, initiated by the Zapatero Government in 2004, prompted Moroccan authorities to take measures deterring and restricting irregular migration. Consequently, the migratory pressure shifted towards the maritime route between El Aaiún in Western Sahara and the Canary Islands. This route typically lasts throughout the night. Over time, fishermen's vessels (such as dugouts or pateras) from Western Sahara, equipped with more powerful engines and accommodating more migrants, have begun their journeys from coastal areas further from El Aaiún. Additionally, restrictions along the Mauritanian and Moroccan coasts discouraged fishermen from embarking on this extended journey, leading to southward-oriented starting points along the coasts of Senegal, Gambia, and the Gulf of Guinea.

The expansion in distance and the risks associated with these transfers have escalated economic costs and human casualties during the journey to the West. Migrants, equipped with only basic tools like a compass and limited knowledge of boat navigation, are responsible for guiding the vessels, significantly heightening the dangers. This has resulted in an increase in shipwrecks along the Atlantic coasts.

In 2023, some 39,900 migrants travelled to the Canary Islands.

On 21 June 2023, 35-39 migrants died when their rubber dinghy sank off the coast of the Canary Islands.

Some 19,000 migrants travelled to the Canary Islands in the first half of 2024.

In July 2024 an incident off the coast of Mauritania claimed some 90 lives from among a group heading for the Canary Islands; 2024 saw a record number (9,757) of deaths and missing en route from the African coast to the Canary Islands.

A vessel which departed Mauretania on 2 January 2025 carrying 86 persons capsized off Western Sahara a fortnight later. 50 people were killed.

=== Direct voyages to Spain and Portugal ===
Some seventy people have died in the Strait of Gibraltar and Alboran Sea area between Morocco and Spain in the first half of 2024.

== Routes to the Middle East ==
A considerable flow of migrants crosses the Red Sea and the Gulf of Aden from the Horn of Africa to Yemen for onward transit among Arabian countries in search of employment. This is frequently unofficial, all too often with disastrous results.

== See also ==
- Emigration from Africa
  - to Europe
  - to Latin America
  - to the United States
