= Emigration from Africa =

This article addresses recent emigration from Africa. See African diaspora for a general treatment of historic population movements. See recent African origin of modern humans for pre-historic human migration.

Map showing location of Africa.

During the period of 1965 – 2021, an estimated 440,000 people per year emigrated from Africa; a total number of 17 million migrants within Africa was estimated for 2005. The figure of 0.44 million African emigrants per year (corresponding to about 0.05% of the continent's total population) pales in comparison to the annual population growth of about 2.6%, indicating that only about 2% of Africa's population growth is compensated for by emigration.

== Countries of Origin ==
=== North Africa ===
Northern African nations are diverse in culture, religion, ethnicity, nationalism, and language due to their strategic locations for commerce and their commercial trades with Southern Africa, Europe, and the Persian Gulf region. In the last decades, emigration from North Africa, particularly from Tunisia, Morocco, and Algeria to Europe, North America, and Arab countries increased dramatically due to colonization, socio-political insecurity, extended war, and a high unemployment rate.

The Maghreb (Morocco, Tunisia, Algeria, Libya, and Mauritania) hasn't been the end line for Southern and Sub-Saharan migrants. While few travelers from other parts of the continent settled down permanently, most used the Maghreb as a transit and temporary workplace. Europe has been the destination of 87% of North African emigrants. In the last decades, the emigration pattern of women, men, and children from Africa fluctuated due to Western countries' policy changes and the overtaking of the Persian Gulf labor jobs by Southeast Asia workers. Emigration of North African people increased from 6.2 million to 9.3 million in 13 years from 2000 to 2013. Morocco-born residents in Europe doubled from 1993 to 2004. When Euro-Mediterranean countries suffered from an economic crisis in the 1970s, the governments of European nations modified their emigration law to limit legal and illegal emigration from Africa, but it failed. Since 1974, the emigration of women and children has increased remarkably as a consequence of Europe's emigration allowance for nuclear family reunification.

North African countries' locations on the global map

During the 2000s, North Africa had been receiving large numbers of Sub-Saharan African migrants "in transit", predominantly from West Africa, who plan to enter Europe. An annual 22,000 illegal migrants took the route from either Tunisia or Libya to Lampedusa in the 2000–2005 period. This figure decreased in 2006, but it has increased greatly as a result of the 2011 Tunisian revolution and the 2011 Libyan civil war.

=== Sub-Saharan ===
In 2005, 10,000 West African migrants heading for Europe were stranded in the Mauritanian port of Nouadhibou, and 20,000 sub-Saharan African migrants were waiting for an opportunity to cross to Europe in the Spanish enclaves in North Africa.

For Sub-Saharan Africa, the World Bank report estimated a stock of 21.8 million (2.5% of population) emigrants vs. 17.7 million (2.1% of total population) immigrants. 63.0% of migration was estimated as taking place intra-regionally, while 24.8% of migration was to high-income OECD countries. The top ten migration corridors were 1. Burkina Faso–Côte d'Ivoire, 2. Zimbabwe–South Africa, 3. Côte d'Ivoire–Burkina Faso, 4. Uganda–Kenya, 5. Eritrea–Sudan, 6. Mozambique–South Africa, 7. Mali–Côte d'Ivoire, 8. Democratic Republic of Congo–Rwanda, 9. Lesotho–South Africa, 10. Eritrea–Ethiopia.

Year	Sub-Saharan African lawful permanent residents and Sub-Saharan African refugee arrivals to the United States
2010	52 000
2011	48 000
2012	54 000
2013	56 000
2014	58 000
2015	60 000
2016	78 000

Sub-Saharan African residents
By country	United States
Nigeria	280 000
Ethiopia	220 000
Ghana	160 000
Kenya	120 000
South Africa	100 000
Somalia	90 000
Liberia	80 000
Zimbabwe	50 000
Tanzania	50 000
Cameroon	50 000

	Percentage that would live in another country if had the means and opportunity to go
Ghana	75 % of the pop.
Nigeria	74 % of the pop.
Kenya	54 % of the pop.
South Africa	51 % of the pop.
Senegal	46 % of the pop.
Tanzania	43 % of the pop.

The World Bank Migration and Remittances Factbook of 2011 gives separate regional summaries for Sub-Saharan Africa on one hand and the Middle East and North Africa on the other. For both regions, there is a surplus of emigrants, even though a substantial part of migration takes place within each region.

For the Middle East and North Africa, there was an estimated stock of 18.1 million (5.3% of population) emigrants vs. 12.0 million (3.5% of population) immigrants. 31.5% of migration took place intra-regional, 40.2% was to high-income OECD countries. The main migration corridors for North Africa were identified as Egypt–Saudi Arabia, Algeria–France Egypt–Jordan, Morocco–France, Morocco–Spain, Morocco–Italy, and Egypt–Libya. The portion of refugees was estimated at 65.3% of migrants.

== Destinations ==
=== Europe ===
There is significant migration from Africa to Europe.

As of 2007, there were an estimated seven million African migrants living in OECD countries. Of these, about half are of North African origin, mostly residing in France, Italy, Belgium, Spain and the Netherlands, while the other half are of Sub-Saharan African origin, present throughout Western Europe, with significant concentrations in Belgium, France, Italy, the Netherlands, Portugal, Spain and the United Kingdom. The rate of migration is projected to increase in the coming decades, according to Sir Paul Collier, a development economist.

The European Union Frontex agency's "Operation Hermes" is also monitoring the Mediterranean between North Africa and Italy. Due to increased border controls along the Mediterranean, there has been a shift of preferred migration routes towards Greece.

Approximate populations of African origin in Europe:

- Arabs and Berbers (including North African and Middle Eastern Arabs): approx. 5 million, mostly in France, Italy, the Netherlands, Austria, Belgium, Germany, United Kingdom, Sweden, Spain, Norway, Denmark, Switzerland, Greece and Russia. (see Arabs in Europe)
- Sub-Equatorial Africans: approx. 5 million; mostly in Italy, France, the United Kingdom, Germany, Austria, Spain, the Netherlands and Portugal.
- Horn Africans: approx. 1 million, mostly Somalis and Eritreans, mostly in United Kingdom, Germany, Sweden, Austria, the Netherlands, Norway, Denmark, Finland
- Ethnic Europeans with colonial roots: approx. 8 million; mostly in France, United Kingdom, Greece, Romania and Belgium.
- North African Jews: approx. 500 thousands; mostly in France.

Sub-Saharan African residents in:
	European Union, Norway, and Switzerland
Nigeria	390 000
South Africa	310 000
Somalia	300 000
Senegal	270 000
Ghana	250 000
Angola	220 000
Kenya	180 000
D. C. Congo	150 000
Cameroon	150 000
Ivory Coast	140 000

	Sub-Saharan African asylum applicants to Europe
2010	58 000
2011	84 000
2012	74 000
2013	91 000
2014	139 000
2015	164 000
2016	196 000
2017	168 000

=== Asia ===
Many young African students choose China as a destination, as the presence of Chinese industries and businesses in Africa has increased considerably in recent years.

=== North America ===
African immigration to the United States has been comparatively slight, totaling around 3,183,104 individuals as of 2010.

=== Central and South America ===
There is also a record of people from Africa plus Central and South American countries such as Brazil, Panama and Mexico who self-reported their country of origin.

=== Oceania ===
In Australia, the number of immigrants from Africa has grown substantially since the 1990s, with most concentrated in Sydney, Melbourne and Perth. The largest of these African Australian populations is the South African community, and the Census in 2011 recorded 145,683 South Africa-born people in Australia. News anchor Anton Enus, the author J. M. Coetzee, and the singer Selwyn Pretorius are examples of local celebrities from this community. Also substantial is the 40,000-strong Egyptian Australian community, mostly concentrated in Sydney, the 30,000-strong Zimbabwean Australian community, and the 28,000-strong Mauritian Australian community.

== Effects of emigration on Africa ==
=== Brain drain ===
The phrase brain drain originated in the 1950s in Britain, during the campaign to stop scholars' immigration to the USA, and since has been used to define the emigration of academics and businesspersons to developed countries. Millions of well-educated, intelligent, and wealthy African-born people emigrated to the West and the USA for various reasons, such as seeking high-income job opportunities, higher education, freedom, safety, and a happy life. In 2000, African-born doctors and nurses accounted for 65000 and 70000 healthcare workforces in developed countries, respectively. The migration of scholars to developed countries negatively impacts the economy and healthcare qualities of 48 African countries. The migration of physicians and nurses has resulted in a high HIV AIDS-related death rate, high child mortality rate, and poor health in Africa.

=== Talent drain ===
Especially sports talent.

=== Economic ===
- Loss of educational investment due to brain drain
- Loss of labor force
- Dependence

But

- Remittances
- Trade

== Benefits of emigration for Africa ==
People of African descent who reside in Europe, North America, and the Middle East provide for their families, assist in reconstructing their nations following civil wars, and promote geopolitical stability through financial support to local communities and households. Although a small portion of global remittances was sent to Africa, the remittance income climbed from 1.9 billion to 4.6 billion dollars between 1990 and 2000. In 2006, 1.6% of African GDP was generated from African diasporas. In 2008, Sub-Saharan Africa (SSA) received 6.2% of worldwide remittances. Despite sending substantial money, African diasporas have not brought significant changes in African economic development.

=== African recipients of remittances between the 1990s and the 2000s ===
- North Africa (NA) 72%
- West Africa 14%
- Southern Africa 8%
- East Africa 6%
- Central Africa less than 1%

=== Factors that hinder remittances' effects on African development ===
- Corrupt administration
- Continental insecurity
- Limited business opportunities
- Absence of government support and encouragement
- Strict financial laws

== Reasons for emigration ==
- Coloniality and underdevelopment
- Epistemic imbalance
- Conflict
- Depressed economies
- Climate change
- Unstable politics
- Poverty
- Ethno-religious conflicts
- Rapidly growing population

== Risks and dangers of emigration ==
=== Difficulties faced by emigrants on the journey ===
- Extortion
- Human trafficking
- Slavery
- Imprisonment
- Forced labor
- Rape
- Torture

=== Difficulties faced by emigrants at destination countries ===
- Marginalization
- Racial discrimination
- Little economic opportunity
- Legal issues
- Police targeting
- Poor housing conditions
- Rights not always recognized

== See also ==
- African immigration to the United States
- African immigration to Canada
- African immigration to Latin America
- African immigration to Europe
- African Australians
- African New Zealanders
- Migrants' African routes
- Intra-African migration
- Free movement protocol
- Threats facing illegal immigrants
- Work visa: required in some cases for economic emigration towards some countries

== Bibliography ==
- Arno Tanner, Emigration, Brain Drain and Development: the case of Sub-Saharan Africa, 2009, ISBN 978-952-99592-1-1.
- Belachew Gebrewold-Tochalo (ed.), Africa and Fortress Europe: threats and opportunities, Ashgate Publishing, Ltd., 2007, ISBN 978-0-7546-7204-3.
- Hein de Haas, Irregular Migration from West Africa to the Maghreb and the European Union: An Overview of Recent Trends, International Organization for Migration, Geneva, 2008.
