= African immigration to Canada =

Individuals residing in Canada who were born in Africa

Total population
- 800,000+

Regions with significant populations
- Toronto, Brampton, Montreal, Ottawa, Calgary, Edmonton, Quebec City, Winnipeg, Vancouver

Religion
- Christianity, Islam, traditional, other

Related ethnic groups
- African immigration to the United States

African immigration to Canada refers to immigrants to Canada who are or were nationals of modern African countries.

According to Statistics Canada, African-born individuals comprised 15.6% of recent immigrants to Canada as of 2021. This was the second largest number of recent immigrants to the nation after the Middle East and Asia region. As of 2021, the top five countries of birth of recent African-born Black immigrants to Canada were Nigeria, Ethiopia, Democratic Republic of Congo, Cameroon and Somalia.

Among the population in Canada with an immigrant background, persons with ancestry from Africa were the youngest residents as of 2016, with the largest proportion aged between 0 and 14 years old (~12%).

Many immigrants from French-speaking African countries have settled in Quebec. Of these, most were from Côte d'Ivoire, Congo-Kinshasa and Senegal, as well as Algeria, Morocco and Tunisia.

== See also ==
- Black Canadians
- Emigration from Africa
- African immigration to the United States
