= African immigration to the United States =

African Americans the United States
African Americans

Total population
- African: 3,183,104 (Sub-Saharan African: 2,847,199 + North African: 335,895) (2010 U.S. Census)

Regions with significant populations
- New York City, Washington-Baltimore metropolitan area, Philadelphia, New Jersey, Houston, Atlanta, Dallas, Los Angeles, San Diego, San Francisco/Oakland/San Jose, Minneapolis, Columbus, Chicago, Boston, Providence, Miami, New Orleans, San Antonio, Tennessee, Albuquerque, Salt Lake City, Seattle, Portland, Denver

Languages
- English (African English, American English), Arabic, Igbo, Yoruba, Akan, Lingala, Nuer, Meta, Dinka, Shilluk, French, Wolof, Swahili, Amharic, Somali, Tigrinya, Berber, Afrikaans, Hausa, Portuguese, Cape Verdean Crioulo, Spanish, others

Religion
- Christianity; Islam; traditional; others

Related ethnic groups
- Other African people

African immigration to the United States refers to immigrants to the United States who are or were nationals of modern African countries. The term African in the scope of this article refers to geographical or national origins rather than racial affiliation. From the Immigration and Nationality Act of 1965 to 2017, the African-born population in the United States grew to 2.1 million people.

Africans in the United States come from almost all regions in Africa and do not constitute a homogeneous group. They include peoples from different national, linguistic, ethnic, racial, cultural and social backgrounds. U.S. and foreign born Africans are different and distinct from native-born African Americans, many of whose ancestors were involuntarily brought from West Africa to the colonial United States by means of the historic Atlantic slave trade. African immigration is now driving the growth of the Black population in New York City.

== Immigration legislation ==
=== Citizenship ===
In the 1870s, the Naturalization Act was extended to allow "aliens, being free white persons and to aliens of African nativity and to persons of African descent" to acquire citizenship. Immigration from Africa was theoretically permitted, unlike non-white immigration from Asia.

=== Quotas enacted between 1921 and 1924 ===
Several laws enforcing national origins quotas on U.S. immigration were enacted between 1921 and 1924 and were in effect until they were repealed in 1965. While the laws were aimed at restricting the immigration of Jews and Catholics from Southern and Eastern Europe and immigration from Asia, they also impacted African immigrants. The legislation effectively excluded Africans from entering the country.

The Emergency Quota Act of 1921 restricted immigration from a given country to 3% of the number of people from that country living in the U.S. according to the census of 1910. The Immigration Act of 1924, also known as the Johnson-Reed Act, reduced that to 2% of the number of people from that country who were already living in the U.S. in 1890. Under the system, the quota for immigrants from Africa (excluding Egypt) totaled 1,100 (the number was increased to 1,400 under the 1952 McCarran–Walter Act.) That contrasted to immigrants from Germany, which had a limit of 51,227.

=== Repeal of quotas ===
The Immigration and Nationality Act of 1965, also known as the Hart-Celler Act, repealed the national quotas and subsequently there was a substantial increase in the number of immigrants from developing countries, particularly in Africa and Asia. This act also provided a separate category for refugees. The act also provided greater opportunity for family reunification.

=== Diversity Immigrant Visa ===
The Diversity Visa Program, or green card lottery, is a program created by the Immigration Act of 1990. It allows people born in countries with low rates of immigration to the United States to obtain a lawful permanent resident status. Each year, 50,000 of those visas are distributed at random. Almost 38% of those visas were attributed to African born immigrants in 2016. African born persons also represent the most numerous group among the applicants since 2013. The application is free of charge, and the requirements in terms of education are either a high school diploma or two years of a professional experience which requires at least two years of training.

== Recent migration trends and factors ==
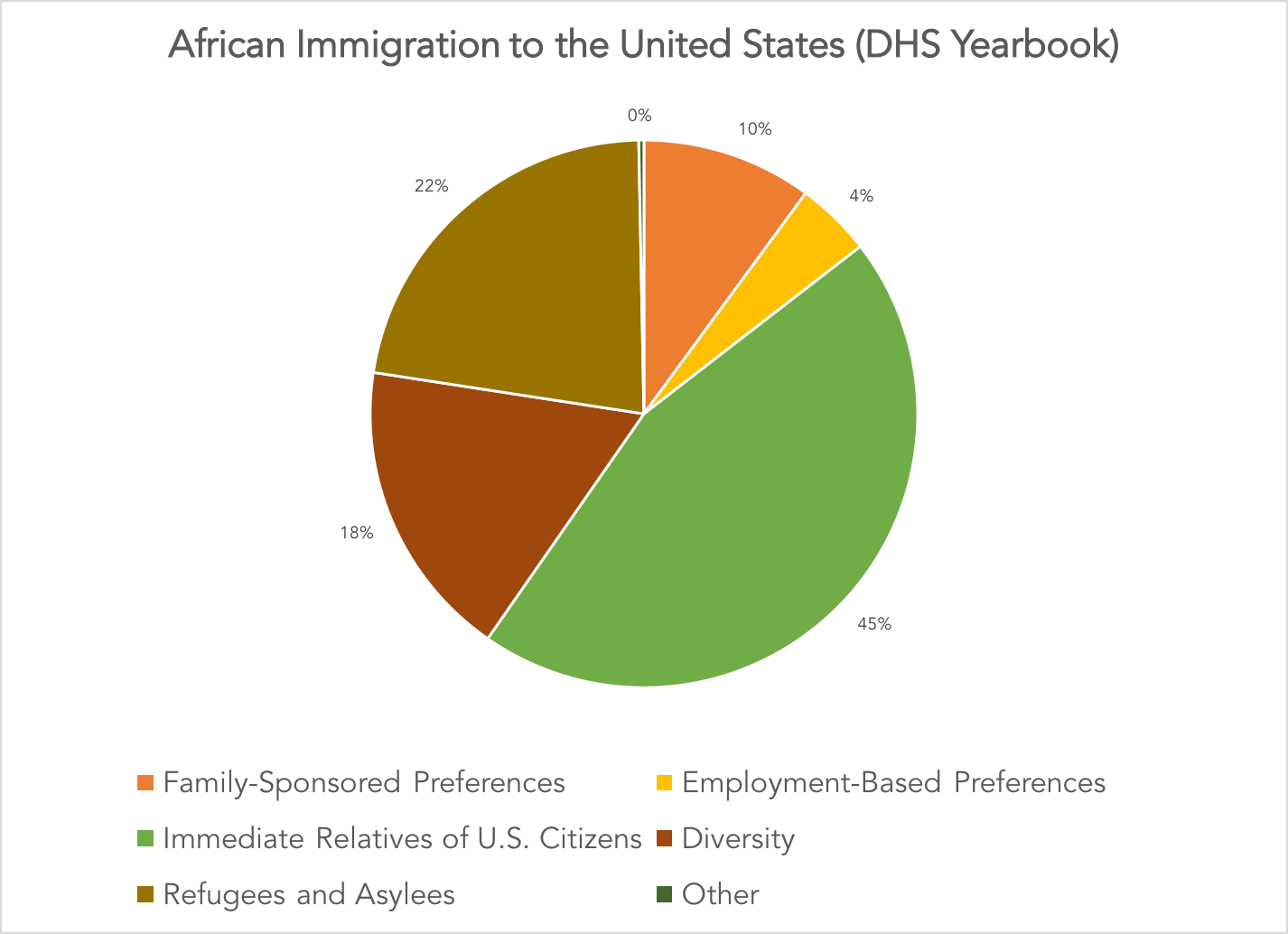
African immigration to the U.S. by broad class of admission

The continent of Africa has seen many changes in migrations patterns over the course of history. The graph below shows African immigration to the United States in 2016 based on class of admission with numbers from the Department of Homeland Security's Yearbook. The number of Black immigrants living in the United States reached 4.6 million in 2019, an increase from approximately 800,000 in 1980, and which accounted for 19% of the growth in the overall U.S. Black population. Close to 31% came to the U.S. between 2010 and 2019.

The influx of African immigrants began in the latter part of the 20th century and is often referred to as the "fourth great migration." About three-fourths of all out-migration from Africa went to the United States after 1990. This trend began after decolonization, as many Africans moved to the U.S. seeking an education and to escape poverty, and has risen steadily over time. The increase in the rate of migration is projected to continue for the coming decades. Originally, these immigrants came with the sole purpose of advancing themselves before returning to their respective countries. Nevertheless, many immigrants never return. In recent years there has been an increase in the number of African immigrants interested in gaining permanent residence in the U.S.; this has led to a severe brain drain on the economies of African countries due to many skilled hard-working Africans leaving Africa to seek their economic fortunes in the U.S. and elsewhere.

One major factor that contributes to migration from Africa to the United States is labor opportunities. It has been relatively easier for African immigrants with advanced education to leave and enter international labor markets. In addition, many Africans move to the United States for advanced training. For example, doctors from different African nations would move to the U.S. in order to gain more economic opportunities compared to their home country. However, as more Africans emigrate to the United States, their reasoning and factors tend to become more complex.

Many Africans who migrate to the United States return their income to Africa in the source of remittances. In Nigeria, for example, remittances from Nigerians in the United States to Nigeria totaled to $6.1 billion in 2012, approximately 3% of Nigeria's GDP. The important role of remittances in improving the lives of family members in the United States has led to both migration and migrants remaining in the United States.

Following educational and economic trends of migration, family reunification has driven recent trends of migration. Family reunification refers to the ability of U.S. citizens to sponsor family members for immigration. Sponsoring immediate family members and other family preferences led to 45% and 10% of all African immigration in 2016 respectively. Legal service organizations such as the African Advocacy Network aid in family members sponsoring new immigrants to the United States.

Additionally, refugees make up a large class of admission to the United States. Recent crises in the Central African Republic, South Sudan, Nigeria, and Burundi have been sources of migrants in recent years. With recent restrictions on refugee entrance to the United States, refugees may face a harder time entering the United States.

=== White South African refugee program ===
In February 2025, President Donald Trump signed an executive order declaring the White Afrikaaner population oppressed people - in response to the 2024 Expropriation Act passed in South Africa, which allows confiscation of Afrikaner lands to redistribute to the black population. Trump declared that the US will be accepting Afrikaners as refugees.

President Trump also started the White South African refugee program, On May 12, 2025, the first group of 59 white South Africans arrived in Dulles in northern Virginia under the program. They were welcomed at Dulles International Airport by U.S. officials, including Deputy Secretary of State Christopher Landau, and were provided with resettlement assistance. According to the State Department, all spoke English, and about a third already had relatives in the United States. The refugee applications of the Afrikaner minority were expedited by the Trump administration, which cited "racial discrimination" as the justification for granting priority status.

On June 2, 2025, U.S. officials reported that a second group of 9 white South Africans arrived a few days prior.

=== African immigration ban ===
Countries affected by the June 4, 2025 proclamation Nationals banned from traveling to the U.S. Nationals partially restricted from traveling to the U.S.

On June 4, 2025, President Donald Trump issued a proclamation, restricting entry from Chad, Republic of the Congo, Equatorial Guinea, Eritrea, Somalia and Sudan, as well as partially restricting entry from Sierra Leone and Togo.

==== Fully restricted ====
- Chad
- Republic of the Congo
- Equatorial Guinea
- Eritrea
- Libya
- Somalia
- Sudan

==== Partially restricted ====
The order also partially bans travelers from the following countries, where citizens may only seek temporary work visas:

- Sierra Leone
- Togo

== Population ==
African immigrants' (US) ancestries in the 2000 – 2010 American Community Survey (from more than 1,000 people)
Ancestry	2000	2010
"African"	1,183,316	1,676,413)
Algerian	8,752	14,716
Angolan	1,642	
Cameroonian	8,099	16,894
Cape Verdean	77,103	95,003
Congolese	5,488 (only Democratic Republic of the Congo)	11,009
"Eastern Africans"	2,129	
Egyptian	142,832	197,000
Eritrean	18,917	
Ethiopian	68,001	202,715
Gambian	3,035	
Ghanaian	49,944	91,322
Guinea	3,016	
Ivorian	3,110	
Kenyan	17,336	51,749
Liberian	25,575	51,296
Libyan	2,979	
Malian	1,790	
(Morocco) Moroccan	38,923	82,073
Nigerian	162,938	264,550
"North African/Berber"	4,544 ("North Africans": 3,217; "Berbers": 1,327)	
Rwandan	1,480	
Senegalese	6,124	11,369
Sierra Leonean	12,410	16,929
Somali	36,313	120,102
South African	44,991	57,491
Sudanese	14,458	42,249
Tanzanian	2,921	
Togolese	1,716	
Tunisian	4,735	
Ugandan	4,707	12,549
"Western African"	6,810	
Zambian	1,500	
Zimbabwean	4,521	7,323
TOTAL	More than 1,000,000	NA

== Demographics ==
Metros with largest African-born population (2010 Census)
Metropolitan area	African population	% of total metro population
Washington, DC, MD-VA-WV	171,000	2.9
Minneapolis-St. Paul, MN	70,100	1.3
Atlanta, GA	70,100	1.3
Boston, MA-NH	61,600	1.3
Baltimore Area, MD	33,100	1.2
New York, NY	223,000	1.1
Dallas–Fort Worth, TX	64,300	0.9
Houston, TX	56,100	0.9
San Antonio, TX	68,100	0.5
Greater Los Angeles Area	68,100	0.5
San Francisco Bay Area	24,500	0.5

The total immigrant population from Africa estimated for 2015-2019 was 2,256,700. The top counties were:

1) Harris County, TX ----------------------------- 70,200

2) Los Angeles County, CA ------------------- 59,900

3) Bronx Borough, NY --------------------------- 56,000

4) Montgomery County, MD ----------------- 54,700

5) Hennepin County, MN ---------------------- 53,700

6) Prince George's County, MD ------------- 53,000

7) Dallas County, TX ----------------------------- 46,700

8) King County, WA ------------------------------- 42,500

9) Cook County, IL -------------------------------- 42,100

10) Franklin County, OH ----------------------- 41,400

11) Fairfax County, VA -------------------------- 39,400

12) Tarrant County, TX ------------------------- 34,900

13) Brooklyn Borough, NY -------------------- 32,500

14) Gwinnett County, GA ---------------------- 26,800

15) Essex County, NJ --------------------------- 26,700

16) Suffolk County, Mass. -------------------- 25,000

17) Philadelphia County, PA ----------------- 25,000

18) Queens Borough, NY ---------------------- 24,700

19) DeKalb County, GA ------------------------- 24,500

20) Maricopa County, AZ --------------------- 24,000

21) Middlesex County, Mass. --------------- 23,500

22) Fort Bend County, TX --------------------- 22,000

23) Manhattan Borough, NY ---------------- 21,700

24) Baltimore County, MD ------------------ 21,500

25) Ramsey County, MN ---------------------- 20,300

It is estimated that the 2017 population of African immigrants to the United States was about 2.1 million. According to the Migration Policy Institute, as of 2009 two-thirds of the African immigrants were from either East or West Africa. Countries with the most immigrants to the U.S. are Nigeria, Egypt, Ethiopia, Ghana, South Africa, Somalia, Eritrea, and Kenya. Seventy five percent (75%) of the African immigrants to the U.S. come from 12 of the 55 countries, namely Nigeria, Egypt, Ghana, Ethiopia, South Africa, Kenya, Liberia, Somalia, Morocco, Cape Verde, Sierra Leone and Sudan (including what is now the independent country of South Sudan), which is based on the 2000 census data.

In 2024, the African immigrant population in the United States continued to grow steadily. According to the latest data, the number of African immigrants in the United States has already surpassed that of 2017, with the immigrant population increasing from about 2.1 million to more than 2.4 million. The trend that African immigrants mainly come from West Africa and East Africa remains unchanged. Nigeria, Egypt, Ghana, Kenya and Ethiopia continue to be the main source countries for immigrants to the United States.

Recently, the proportion of immigrants from African countries has increased, reflecting the rapid population growth in the region and the impact of economic, social, and political factors. The immigrant population from West African countries has increased significantly. Most immigrants from these countries are well educated and seek opportunities in technical and professional fields in the United States. Meanwhile, immigrants from countries such as Eritrea and Sudan are mostly seeking refuge due to political and conflict-related difficulties.

A major push factor for African immigration was the Diversity Visa Program and the 1980 Refugee Act, which facilitated the immigration of many Africans from conflict-affected regions such as Somalia and Eritrea. African immigrants are highly concentrated in states such as Texas, New York, and California, and they account for a significant proportion of the immigrant population in places such as Maryland and Minnesota.

Additionally, according to the U.S. Census, 55% of immigrants from Africa are male, while 45% are female. Age groups with the largest cohort of African-born immigrants are 25–34, 35–44, and 45–54 with 24.5%, 27.9%, and 15.0% respectively.

Africans typically congregate in urban areas, moving to suburban areas over time. They are also one of the groups who are least likely to live in racially segregated areas. The goals of Africans vary tremendously. While some look to create new lives in the US, some plan on using the resources and skills gained to go back and help their countries of origin. Either way, African communities contribute millions to the economies of Africa through remittances. Ogbuagu (2013) found that Diasporic Nigerians across the globe reportedly remitted $21 billion (N3.36 trillion-Naira) to the homeland in 2012 alone.

Immigrants from Africa, once they arrive in the U.S., typically settle in heavily urban areas upon arrival. Areas such as Washington, D.C., New York, Baltimore, Philadelphia, Dallas, Houston, San Antonio, Atlanta, Chicago, Los Angeles, Boston, Columbus, and Minneapolis have heavy concentrations of African immigrant populations. Often there are clusters of nationalities within these cities. The longer African immigrants live in the United States, the more likely they are to live in suburban areas.

In the San Francisco Bay Area, there are officially 40,000 African immigrants, although it has been estimated that the population is actually four times this number when considering undocumented immigrants. The majority of these immigrants were born in Ethiopia, Egypt, Nigeria, and South Africa.

African immigrants like many other immigrant groups are likely to establish and find success in small businesses. Many Africans that have seen the economic stability that comes from ethnic enclaves such as Chinatowns have recently been establishing ethnic enclaves of their own at much higher rates to reap the benefits of such communities. Such examples include Little Ethiopia in Los Angeles and Little Senegal in New York City.

State/territory	Subsaharan African population (2019 Census)	Percentage
Alabama	44,872	
Alaska	2,200	
Arizona	58,584	
Arkansas	42,549	
California	319,119	
Colorado	56,591	
Connecticut	38,138	
Delaware	15,648	
District of Columbia	20,108	
Florida	161,983	
(Georgia (U.S. state)) Georgia	199,299	
Hawaii	4,510	
Idaho	3,243	
Illinois	127,008	
Indiana	61,567	
Iowa	31,301	
Kansas	26,179	
Kentucky	38,745	
Louisiana	45,340	
Maine	14,674	
Maryland	248,180	
Massachusetts	149,753	
Michigan	80,461	
Minnesota	178,662	
Mississippi	2,300	
Missouri	54,003	
Montana	2,760	
Nebraska	28,566	
Nevada	45,510	
New Hampshire	8,701	
New Jersey	122,485	
New Mexico	6,826	
New York	263,282	
North Carolina	133,428	
North Dakota	8,100	
Ohio	137,487	
Oklahoma	17,477	
Oregon	24,159	
Pennsylvania	131,704	
Rhode Island	30,235	
South Carolina	47,684	
South Dakota	7,200	
Tennessee	95,626	
Texas	446,330	
Utah	18,672	
Vermont	2,400	
Virginia	226,140	
Washington	114,071	
West Virginia	8,748	
Wisconsin	32,632	
Wyoming	-	
USA	2 million	

== Educational attainment ==
African immigrants to the US are among the most educated groups in the United States. Some 48.9 percent of all African immigrants hold a college diploma. This is more than double the rate of native-born white Americans, and nearly four times the rate of native-born African Americans. According to the 2000 Census, the rate of college diploma acquisition is highest among Egyptian Americans at 59.7 percent, followed closely by Nigerian Americans at 58.6 percent.

In 1997, 19.4 percent of all adult African immigrants in the United States held a graduate degree, compared to 8.1 percent of adult white Americans and 3.8 percent of adult black Americans in the United States, respectively. According to the 2000 Census, the percentage of Africans with a graduate degree is highest among Nigerian Americans at 28.3 percent, followed by Egyptian Americans at 23.8 percent.

Of the African-born population in the US age 25 and older, 87.9% reported having a high school degree or higher, compared with 78.8% of Asian-born immigrants and 76.8% of European-born immigrants, respectively. Africans from Kenya (90.8 percent), Nigeria (89.1 percent), Ghana (85.9 percent), Botswana (84.7 percent), and Malawi (83 percent) were the most likely to report having a high school degree or higher.

Those born in Cape Verde (44.8 percent) and Mauritania (60.8 percent) were the least likely to report having completed a high school education.

The educational attainment of immigrant groups varies by region of origin. Among all black immigrant subgroups, the share of adults aged 25 and over with a bachelor's degree or higher increased. Between 2000 and 2019, the degree attainment of black adults born in the Caribbean and South America increased by 7 percentage points (from 16% to 23% for black Caribbean adults and from 20% to 27% for black South American adults). As of 2019, about 40 percent (41 percent) of black adults aged 25 and older had a bachelor's degree or higher, while about a quarter (23 percent) of black adults of Caribbean descent had at least a bachelor's degree, compared with 33 percent of all foreign-born and U.S.-born adults.

Black immigrants from Africa are generally more highly educated than other groups in the United States (this region accounts for more than 40% of the foreign-born black population). This phenomenon is related to immigration patterns and the way in which people enter the United States. Many African immigrants come to the United States through the Diversity Visa Program, which requires applicants to have completed formal primary and secondary education.

African immigrants excel in many ways. They have a high rate of naturalization, a higher level of education than the overall U.S. population, and are more likely to earn degrees in science, technology, engineering, and mathematics (STEM). In addition, they make important contributions to several key economic sectors, such as healthcare, which have been facing labor shortages.

== Health ==
U.S. immigrants that come from predominantly black nations in Africa are generally healthier than black immigrants from predominantly white nations or from Europe. A study conducted by Jen'nan Ghazal Read, a sociology professor at the UC Irvine, and Michael O. Emerson, a sociology professor at Rice University, studied the health of more than 2,900 black immigrants from top regions of emigration: the West Indies, Africa, South America and Europe. Black people born in Africa and South America have been shown to be healthier than U.S.-born black people. The study was published in the September issue of Social Forces and is the first to look at the health of black immigrants by their region of origin.

== Culture ==
African immigrants tend to retain their culture once in the United States. Instead of abandoning their various traditions, they find ways to reproduce and reinvent themselves. Cultural bonds are cultivated through shared ethnic or national affiliations. Some organizations like the Ghanaian group Fantse-Kuo and the Sudanese Association organize by country, region, or ethnic group. Other nonprofits like the Malawi Washington Association and the Ugandan North American Association (UNAA) organize by national identity, and are inclusive of all Malawians and Ugandans, respectively. Other groups present traditional culture from a pan-African perspective. Using traditional skills and knowledge, African-born entrepreneurs develop services for immigrants and the community at large. In the Washington area, events such as the annual Ethiopian soccer tournament, institutions such as the AME Church African Liberation Ministry, and "friends" and "sister cities" organizations bring together different communities. The extent to which African immigrants engage in these activities naturally varies according to the population.

== Religion ==
Religion of African-born Americans (2020)
1. Protestantism (55.0%)
2. Catholicism (20.0%)
3. Other Christian (8.00%)
4. Unaffiliated (8.00%)
5. Other Religion (10.0%)

The religious traditions of African immigrants tend to be pluralistic; they are seen not only as religious institutions, but in many cases also as civic centers. These organizations are central to persevering ethnic identity among these communities. African immigrant religious communities are also central networks and provide services such as counseling, shelter, employment, financial assistance, health services, and real estate tips.

=== Christianity ===
African immigrants practice a diverse array of religions, including Christianity, Islam, and various traditional African faiths. Of these adherents, the largest number are Pentecostals/Charismatic Christians. This form of Christianity is a "primarily evangelical, born-again Pentecostal sect that emphasizes holiness, fervent prayer, charismatic revival, proximate salvation, speaking in tongues, baptism of the Holy Spirit, faith healing, visions, and divine revelations."

Among popular denominational churches are the Brotherhood of the Cross and Star, Seventh Day Adventist Church, Celestial Church of Christ, Cherubim and Seraphim, Christ Apostolic Church, Church of Pentecost, Deeper Life Bible Church, Mountain of Fire and Miracle Ministries (MFM), the Presbyterian Church of Ghana, the Redeemed Christian Church of God and Christ Embassy.

Additionally, Ethiopians and Eritreans have their own churches wherever there is a significant Ethiopian or Eritrean population. Their churches are mainly Ethiopian or Eritrean Orthodox and a few Catholic churches.

==== Continental African churches ====
Many African communities have created their own churches in the United States modeled on continental African churches. Many African churches are Pan-African, but some consist only of nationals from the country of origin. This allows for worship in the native languages of the congregation.

=== Islam ===
Muslim immigrants from nations in Africa adhere to diverse Islamic traditions. These include various Sunni, Shia and Sufi mainstream orders and schools (madhhab) from West Africa, the Swahili Coast, the Indian Ocean islands, the Horn of Africa, and North Africa.

== Cultural influence ==
=== Television ===
Many local cable channels are now purchasing programming channels operated by various African communities. For example, the Africa Channel is broadcast in the United States through Comcast, Charter Communications, Cox Communications and also available in Jamaica, the Bahamas, Trinidad & Tobago, St. Lucia, Barbados, Bermuda, Grenada and other islands throughout the Caribbean. The channel is a showcase for outstanding travel, lifestyle and cultural series, specials and documentaries. These programs feature people of African descent and their stories. The network's premiere on September 1, 2005, marked a milestone in U.S. television history. For the first time, American audiences were able to experience the successes, celebrations and challenges of people living throughout Africa and the Diaspora, all via a general entertainment network. The network is broadcast in the U.S. through national distribution deals with the largest cable MSOs in the country, including Comcast, Charter, and Cox. TV news services such as the Nigerian Television Authority, South African Broadcasting Channel and Ethiopian Television Programming are also available in some areas.

=== Restaurants ===
Immigrants from Africa have opened restaurants in urban areas. The Atlanta, DC, Dallas, Houston, New York and San Antonio Metro areas host many eateries belonging to the Liberian, Senegalese, Nigerian, Ethiopian, Tanzanian, South African and other communities.

=== Music ===
The New York Times and academic scholar Nnamdi O. Madichie have credited American African artists Kelela and Akon for employing fluidity of their cultural heritage through their U.S. and African identities. Recently, academic scholars have brought attention to the influence of African American music on U.S. culture. According to ethnomusicologist Portia Maultsby, African immigrant artists have impacted the U.S. through fashion and mainstream music by utilizing their cultural heritage as a foundation for their artistry. In "Marketing Senegal through hip-hop-a discourse analysis of Akon's music and lyrics", Madichie cites Senegalese-American singer, Akon, as a first-generation African immigrant musician whose music and lyrics create a confluence of West Africa-styled vocals mixed with North America's East Coast and Southern beats. In Mama Africa and Senegal, Akon builds connections between Diasporic communities and the "homeland" through his music.

An examination of the role of Black American entrepreneurs in the hip-hop industry suggests that young Black people have been able to influence the White dominated music industry through transforming "Blackness into capital, staffing and business connections". The New York Times article, "25 Songs That Tell Us Where Music Is Going" illustrates how African immigrants have used their heritage to influence a new sound of mainstream music in the U.S. Wortham cites Kelela, an Ethiopian-American musician, as an American African immigrant who has impacted U.S. culture by defying the notion that Blackness is monolithic through music that pushes the boundaries of R&B in uninhibited experimentation.

Ethnomusicologist Mellonee Burnim's area of aesthetic significance are style of delivery, sound quality, and mechanics of delivery-qualities common to African-derived music. Style of delivery is one of the most important aspects of Africanisms in music. This refers to the stage presentation and physical appearance of when music is performed. Physical appearance is a fundamental part of the Black cultural expression in regard to African-American music. The sways and sashays as well as the physical appearance of African immigrant musicians has a significant influence on U.S. culture exemplified through fashion trends.

Along with style of delivery, sound quality is another significant tradition of Black music that derives from Africanisms. The sound quality of African-American music distinguishes itself because of its African sentiments that are foreign to Western patterns. Maultsby describes how in Africa and the black diaspora, black musicians have managed to cultivate an array of unique sounds that imitate nature, animals, spirits, and speech into their music. Mechanics of delivery involves improvisation of time, text, and pitch to deliver Black audiences a variety in performances.

Textures can be increased through solo voices or adding layers of handclaps. This technique described as "staggered entrances" derives from the improvised singing of slaves. Time is another basic component that can be expanded by extending the length of notes. Finally, pitch produces juxtaposing voices of different ranges in a single voice.

== Visibility ==
Notable African academics in the U.S. include full tenured professors at the nation's top universities, including, at MIT, Elfatih A.B. Eltahir from Sudan; at Caltech, 1999 Nobel Prize in Chemistry Winner Ahmed Zewail from Egypt; at Yale, professor Lamin Sanneh from Gambia; at Columbia University, professor Mahmood Mamdani, from Uganda; at University of California, Davis, professor Isaya Kisekka, from Uganda; at Pennsylvania State University, professor Augustin Banyaga, from Rwanda; at Harvard, professors Jacob Olupona, from Nigeria, Barack Obama Sr. from Kenya, Emmanuel K. Akyeampong from Ghana, Biodun Jeyifo from Nigeria, and John Mugane from Kenya; and at Princeton, Adel Mahmoud from Nigeria, Simon Gikandi from Kenya, V. Kofi Agawu from Ghana, and Kwame Anthony Appiah from Ghana.

In sports, Hakeem Olajuwon, Dikembe Mutombo, Darlington Nagbe, and Freddy Adu are prominent.

Academy Award-winning actress Charlize Theron, entrepreneur Elon Musk, and Grammy Award-winning musician Dave Matthews, are all white South Africans; and two-time Academy Award-nominated actor Djimon Hounsou and Grammy-winning musician Angelique Kidjo, both from Benin; and recently Lupita Nyong'o and Chimamanda Ngozi Adichie, are most notable.

== Notable people of African ancestry ==
=== Academia and science ===
- Claude Ake, Nigerian, professor at Yale University
- Emmanuel K. Akyeampong, Ghanaian, professor of history at Harvard University
- Kwame Anthony Appiah, British-born Ghanaian national, born to a Ghanaian father and British mother, philosopher and writer, professor of philosophy at Princeton University, 2012 National Humanities Medal winner
- Augustin Banyaga, Rwandan, professor at Pennsylvania State University
- Elias Zerhouni, Algerian former director of the National Institutes of Health
- Kwabena Boahen, Ghanaian, professor of bioengineering, Stanford University
- Abbas El Gamal, Egyptian-American electrical engineer, educator and entrepreneur, the recipient of the 2012 Claude E. Shannon Award
- Taher ElGamal, Egyptian-American cryptographer, inventor of the ElGamal discrete log cryptosystem and the ElGamal signature scheme
- Mostafa El-Sayed, Egyptian-American U S. National Medal of Science laureate; leading nanoscience researcher; known for the spectroscopy rule named after him, the El-Sayed rule
- Farouk El-Baz Egyptian-American space scientist who worked with NASA to assist in the planning of scientific exploration of the Moon
- Mohammed Adam El-Sheikh, Sudanese, executive director of the Fiqh Council of North America
- Bisi Ezerioha, Nigerian, automotive engineer, racecar driver and industrialist
- Hany Farid, Professor of computer science at Dartmouth College, pioneer in Digital forensics (Egyptian)
- Simon Gikandi, Kenyan, professor at Princeton University
- Sossina M. Haile, Ethiopian, fuel cell engineer
- Essam Heggy, Egyptian-American Planetary scientist
- Fatima Jibrell, Somali, environmentalist
- Abdul Kallon, Sierra Leonean, US District Judge for the Northern District of Alabama
- Ave Kludze, Ghanaian, senior NASA spacecraft systems engineer
- Nawal M. Nour, Sudanese, obstetrician and gynecologist, 2003 Genius Award winner
- John Ogbu, Nigerian, professor at University of California at Berkeley
- Noureddine Melikechi, Algerian-American Atomic, Molecular, and Optical Physicist, member of the Mars Science Laboratory
- Niyi Osundare, Nigerian, professor at University of New Orleans
- Ato Quayson, Ghanaian, professor of literature Stanford University
- Said Sheikh Samatar, Somali, historian
- Lamin Sanneh, Gambian, professor at Yale University
- Jem Spectar, Cameroonian, president of the University of Pittsburgh at Johnstown
- Ahmed Tewfik, Egyptian-American electrical engineer, Professor and college administrator
- Victor Ukpolo, Nigerian, chancellor of Southern University at New Orleans
- Kwasi Wiredu, Ghanaian, distinguished university professor of philosophy at the Department of Philosophy in the University of South Florida
- Paul Tiyambe Zeleza, Case Western Reserve University
- Ahmed Zewail, Egyptian, winner of 1999 Nobel Prize in Chemistry; professor at California Institute of Technology

=== Politics ===
- Muna Khalif, Somali, fashion designer and politician; MP in the Federal Parliament of Somalia
- Mohamed Mahmoud Ould Mohamedou, Mauritanian, scholar and politician; former Minister of Foreign Affairs and Cooperation of Mauritania
- Zohran Mamdani; Mayor of New York City, former member of the New York State Assembly, Ugandan of Indian origin.
- Barack Obama Sr., Kenyan immigrant who fathered the 44th President of the United States
- Ilhan Omar, Somali, incumbent U.S. Representative for Minnesota's 5th congressional district
- Dina Powell, Egyptian, current U.S. Deputy National Security Advisor for Strategy,

=== Music, TV, and film ===
- Cynthia Addai-Robinson, Ghanaian
- Michael Blackson, Ghanaian, actor and comedian
- Monica Owusu-Breen, Ghanaian-American TV producer and screenwriter; work includes Lost, Brothers & Sisters, Alias and Fringe
- Akosua Busia, Ghanaian, played Nettie in Academy-Award-nominated film The Color Purple
- Edi Gathegi, Kenyan, actor
- Sanaa Hamri, Moroccan, film director
- Djimon Hounsou, Beninese, two-time Academy Award-nominated actor
- Peter Mensah, Ghanaian
- Lupita Nyong'o, Mexican-Kenyan, Academy Award-winning actress
- Omar Sharif, Egyptian, Golden Globe-winning actor
- Cliff Simon, South African
- Nomzamo Mbatha, South African actress and UNCHR ambassador
- Tyla, South African songstress
- Thuso Mbedu, South African actress
- Charlize Theron, South African, Academy Award-winning actress
- Arnold Vosloo, South African
- Vanessa Mdee, Tanzanian singer-songwriter
- Trevor Noah, South African comedian, formerly as host in part of Comedy Central's The Daily Show

=== Sports ===
- Ezekiel Ansah, Ghanaian, NFL football
- Gale Agbossoumonde, Togo by way of Benin, soccer
- Kevin Anderson, South Africa, tennis
- Joshua Clottey, Ghanaian, professional boxer
- Luol Deng, South Sudanese, NBA basketball
- Ebenezer Ekuban, Ghanaian, NFL football
- Joel Embiid, Cameroonian, NBA basketball
- Festus Ezeli, Nigerian, NBA basketball
- Serge Ibaka, Republic of the Congo, NBA basketball
- Meb Keflezighi, Eritrean, runner
- Kofi Kingston, Ghanaian, professional wrestling
- Nana Kuffour, Ghanaian, soccer
- Bernard Lagat, Kenyan, runner
- Luc Mbah a Moute, Cameroonian, NBA basketball
- Dikembe Mutombo, D.R. Congo, NBA basketball
- Danny Mwanga, D.R. Congo, soccer
- Darlington Nagbe, Liberia, soccer
- Betty Okino, Ugandan, gymnastics
- Amobi Okoye, Nigerian, football player
- Hakeem Olajuwon, Nigerian, NBA basketball player
- Henry Rono, Kenyan, professional runner
- Robbie Russell, Ghanaian, soccer
- Emmanuel Sabbi, Ghanaian, soccer
- Pascal Siakam, Cameroonian, NBA basketball player
- Tony Tchani, Cameroonian, soccer
- Hasheem Thabeet, Tanzanian, NBA basketball player
- Jean-Pierre Tokoto, Cameroonian, soccer player
- Masai Ujiri, Nigerian, NBA basketball (general manager)
- Kamaru Usman, Nigerian, mixed-martial artist, UFC Welterweight Champion
- Madieu Williams, Sierra Leonean, NFL football player
- Gedion Zelalem, Ethiopian, soccer

=== Business ===
- Roelof Botha, South African, former chief financial officer of PayPal
- Kase Lukman Lawal, Nigerian, chairman and chief executive officer, CAMAC Holdings
- Elon Musk, South African, co-founder of PayPal, SpaceX and Tesla Motors; CEO and CTO of SpaceX; CEO and product architect of Tesla Motors; chairman of SolarCity

=== Fashion ===
- Amsale Aberra, Ethiopian, fashion designer
- Iman, Somali, fashion and cosmetics entrepreneur; former supermodel
- Kiara Kabukuru, Ugandan, supermodel
- Maria Borges, Angolan, Supermodel
- Liya Kebede, Ethiopian, supermodel, actress and philanthropist
- Nana Meriwether, South African-born, half South African and half African American, Miss Maryland USA 2012, Miss USA 2012 first runner-up
- Oluchi Onweagba, Nigerian, model
- Alek Wek, South Sudanese, supermodel and designer
- Herieth Paul, Tanzanian, model

=== Journalism and literature ===
- Chimamanda Adichie, Nigerian, author; winner of 2008 MacArthur Fellowship "Genius Grant", 2007 Orange Prize and 2005 Commonwealth Writer's Prize
- Selamawi Asgedom, Ethiopian and Eritrean, author
- Dinaw Mengestu, Ethiopian, author
- Charles Mudede, Zimbabwean, filmmaker and film critic
- Micere Mugo, Kenyan, poet and writer
- Toluse Olorunnipa, Nigerian-American
- Laila Lalami, Pulitzer Prize-nominated Moroccan novelist, journalist, essayist, and professor journalist
- Ngũgĩ wa Thiong'o, Kenyan poet and writer
- Mona Eltahawy, Egyptian American Feminist and independent journalist
- Wole Soyinka, Nigerian writer
- Maaza Mengiste, Ethiopian American writer

== See also ==
- African immigration to Canada
- African immigration to Europe
- African immigration to Latin America
- Emigration from Africa
- History of Africans in Baltimore
- Migrants' African routes
- North Africans in the United States
- History of Nigerian Americans in Dallas–Fort Worth
