= West Africans in the United States =

United States residents or citizens of recent West African descent and heritage

West Africans in the United States are Americans with ancestry from West Africa. They include:

- Beninese Americans
- Burkinabé Americans
- Cape Verdean Americans
- Chadian Americans
- Gambian Americans
- Ghanaian Americans
- Guinean Americans
- Guinea-Bissauan Americans
- Ivorian Americans
- Liberian Americans
- Malian Americans
- Mauritanian Americans
- Nigerien Americans
- Nigerian Americans
  - Igbo Americans
  - Yoruba Americans
- Senegalese Americans
- Sierra Leonean Americans
- Togolese Americans

In addition, they include a majority of African American people, whose ancestors were sourced largely from West African states via the Atlantic slave trade.

== See also ==
- West Africa
