= Beninese Americans =

Americans of Beninese birth or descent

Total population
- 605 (mainly, naturalized Benineses and Americans who descendants of Beninese immigrants. 2000 American Community Survey)

Regions with significant populations
- Found in Texas; Oklahoma; Louisiana; Alabama; New York; Massachusetts; Pennsylvania; Chicago; Milwaukee; Washington, D.C.; Atlanta; Miami; Minnesota; Washington; Colorado; California

Languages
- American English; French; Beninese languages

Religion
- Christians; Muslims; and Practitioners of Beninese traditional religion

Related ethnic groups
- African American; Other American groups of West Africa; Togolese; Nigerian; Senegalese; Ivorian; Malian; etc.; Black French

Beninese American are Americans of Beninese descent. According to the census of 2000, in the United States there are only 605 Americans of Beninese origin. However, because since the first half of the eighteenth century to nineteenth many slaves were exported from Benin to the present United States, the number of African Americans with one or more Beninese ancestors could be much higher.

== History ==
The first people from present-day Benin to come to the modern United States were slaves and arrived in the colonial period. Most of the slaves from Benin were imported to South Carolina (36%), Virginia (23%), the Gulf Coast (28%) and Florida (9,8%).

The Clotilda slave ship took from 110 to 160 slaves from Dahomey to Mobile in 1859, including Cudjo Lewis (ca. 1840–1935) and Redoshi (c. 1848–1937), considered to be the last persons born in Africa to have been legally enslaved in the United States), in the Gulf Coast. Between 1719 and 1731, most of the slaves who came to Louisiana came directly from Benin, on ships including the Duc du Maine. Many slaves were from the Fon ethnic group, and others were Nago (Yoruba subgroup, who were enslaved mainly by Spanish settlers, when Louisiana was ruled by Spain) – Ewe, and Gen. Many of the slaves trafficked to what became the United States since Benin were sold by the King of Dahomey, in the Whydah. (Note: Dahomey was one of the main slave-trafficking Kingdoms of West Africa during the colonial period of the Americas and the nineteenth century, trafficking slaves to the European traders of many areas of the Americas (from the U.S. to Brazil).) Not all the slaves sold in what became Benin were from there: many were from other places, and were captured by Dahomeyan warriors. The slaves from what became Benin came from places including Porto-Novo, from where were brought to the port of Ouidah for sale, with many sent to what became the United States.

The slaves brought with them their cultural practices, languages, and religious beliefs rooted in spirit and ancestor worship, which were key elements of Louisiana Voodoo.

Beninese women sometimes worked in hair braiding in the United States. In the late 1990s many other Beninese people from Benin and Europe immigrated to United States in one second wave, to work or study.

== Organizations ==
The Association of Beninese Nationals in the U.S.A. (ARBEUA) was found in Washington, D.C. in 1984

Beninese Americans founded the African Hairbraiding Association of Illinois in 2001 to achieve another form of licensing pressing to state for them.

== Cultural contributions ==
Benin's slaves and then later Haitian migrants who arrived to the state in the late nineteenth century brought voodoo to Louisiana. Their knowledge of herbs, poisons, and the ritual creation of charms and amulets, intended to protect oneself or harm others, became key elements of Louisiana Voodoo.

== Notable people ==
- Ciara
- Lucille Clifton
- Djimon Hounsou
- Angélique Kidjo
- Jonte' Moaning

== See also ==
- Hannibal (slave ship)
- Beninese people in France
- Beninese people in Italy
