= History of Africans in Baltimore =

The city of Baltimore, Maryland includes a significant African population. Immigrants from many African countries have settled in Baltimore, including Nigerians, Sudanese, South Sudanese, Liberians, Sierra Leoneans, Kenyans, Ghanaians, Cameroonians, Ethiopians, Eritreans, and Cape Verdeans. Nigerians, Ghanaians, and Ethiopians are the largest African immigrant groups residing in Baltimore. The largest concentration of African immigrants is located in northeast Baltimore. Nigerians are one of the fastest-growing immigrant groups in Maryland, with many Nigerian-Americans living in northwest Baltimore and adjacent suburbs of Baltimore County, such as Parkville, Owings Mills, and Woodlawn.

== Demographics ==
In 2009, more than one out of every ten immigrants in the Baltimore-Towson, MD metro area (14.5 percent) were immigrants from Africa.

As of 2010, there were 28,834 immigrants from Sub-Saharan Africa in Baltimore.

In February 2011, the Sudanese community of Baltimore numbered only 185 people. Due to South Sudan's independence from Sudan, many South Sudanese have returned to their homeland. Prior to independence, Baltimore's Sudanese community numbered 300 people.

In September 2014, speakers of various languages of Africa were the third largest non-Anglophone group of language speakers in Baltimore, after Hispanophones and Francophones. Additionally, 6,862 African immigrants lived in Baltimore, making Africa the third largest region of origin for immigrants after Latin America and Asia. Nigerians were the sixth largest foreign-born population in Baltimore, Ghanaians were twenty-second, Ethiopians were twenty-third, Sudanese were twenty-ninth, Liberians were thirty-second, Kenyans were thirty-third, Cameroonians were forty-fourth, Sierra Leoneans were forty-sixth, Eritreans were fiftieth, and Cape Verdeans were one-hundredth.

As of 2014, there were over 2,500 Liberian Americans living in Baltimore.

According to the Migration Policy Institute, there were 12,000 Nigerians living in the Baltimore metropolitan area as of 2019.

== Culture ==
An annual festival called FestAfrica was held in Patterson Park in order to celebrate African culture and teach non-Africans about various African cultures and histories. The event was typically attended by 4,000 people and features a picnic, food vendors, and entertainment. After five years in Baltimore, FestAfrica relocated to Silver Spring in 2001.

An annual Nigerian festival is held in Baltimore called the Naija Fest. It is sponsored by the Nigerian Youth Association of Maryland and features art, dance, music, and a feast.

In northeast Baltimore, the Nigerian Igbo Catholic Community celebrates mass in their native Igbo tongue. The NICC spent a decade at St. Matthew in Northwood, several years at The Shrine of the Little Flower, and relocated to St. Anthony of Padua in 2012. In addition to the NICC, the Igbo Community Civic Center INC is also a non-profit organization located in Rosedale, that aims to promote the education and study of Igbo language, Igbo culture and history among Igbo youths.

== See also ==
- History of the African Americans in Baltimore
- History of the Caribbean-Americans in Baltimore
- History of the Ethiopian Americans in Baltimore
