= United African Congress =

Non-governmental organisation supporting the rights of African immigrants

The United African Congress (UAC) is a not-for-profit organization in the United States with its headquarters in New York City and branches in Georgia, Ohio, California, Atlanta and Connecticut. Founded in 1998, the UAC is an umbrella organization representing the interests of African immigrants throughout the country.

The mission of the UAC is to enable continental Africans to participate in activities in the U.S., particularly those that affect their lives, and to promote the betterment of life in both America and Africa.

Specifically, it aims to:

- To unify Continental Africans in the Americas.
- To preserve and promote the image, heritage and culture of the continent of Africa.
- To promote African affairs in the Americas.
- To alleviate the cultural and social difficulties encountered by Continental Africans and to facilitate their settlements as law-abiding people.
- To promote democracy and good governance in Africa and lend support to all legitimate causes that would benefit Africa.
- To engage in any lawful activities for the purpose of raising funds for the organization in order to achieve its stated objectives.

Each year, the UAC gives Millennium Development Awards, based on the UN's Millennium Development Goals. The awards honor African leaders who have made exceptional progress in promoting the public welfare, democracy, and human rights.

== See also ==
- African immigrants to the United States
