= ATSA =

Atsa may stand for:

== Places ==
- Atsa, a village in Haddinnet municipality, Ethiopia

== Acronyms ATSA ==
- ATSA (airline) (Aero Transporte S.A.), a Peruvian airline
- Association for the Treatment and Prevention of Sexual Abuse, an international organisation
- Aviation and Transportation Security Act, United States legislation of 2001
- Army Technical Support Agency, British defence research establishment 1982-1995
- Association of Togolese Students in America
