= Omar Bah =

American journalist

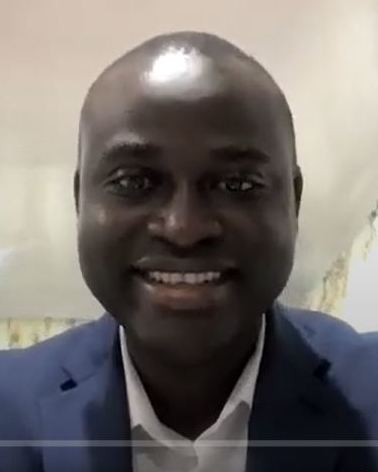
- Bah in 2022
- Born: August 7, 1979 (age 47); Republic of The Gambia
- Education: University of Rhode Island (BA); Roger Williams University (MPA); William James College (MA, PsyD)
- Occupations: Psychologist, author, former journalist, refugee, and survivor leadership specialist
- Known for: Founder of the Refugee Dream Center in Rhode Island
- Political party: Democratic
- Spouse: Teddi Jalllow
- Children: 2
- Website: www.refugeedreamcenter.org www.bahforcongress.com

Omar Bah is a Gambian American psychologist, author, former journalist, refugee, and global survivor leader residing in the United States. He is the founder and executive director of the Refugee Dream Center in Providence, Rhode Island, United States. In 2022, he ran for the United States House of Representatives in Rhode Island's 2nd congressional district.

== Early life and career ==
Omar Bah grew up in a small village in The Gambia, where he was one of the few children to attain a high school education. At the age of 21, while the country was under the control of dictator Yahya Jammeh, Bah sought to become a human rights lawyer to fight political corruption and injustice. However, he could only complete two years of the necessary law program in The Gambia, as students had to travel abroad in order to attain the full degree. Instead of pursuing his legal studies abroad, Bah "decided to combine the legal skills he had acquired with his passion to help the community, and became a journalist" in 2000, specializing in court reporting and seeking to strengthen the freedom of the press.

=== Journalism work ===
During his first year of work at The Independent newspaper, Bah was kidnapped while reporting on a secret trial taking place at a military barracks. He was attacked, tortured, and confined to a closet-sized cell by soldiers, which left him with several injuries. He was held for a day until several witnesses, including human rights workers and fellow journalists, called for his release.

From 2002 to 2006, Bah wrote a column for The Daily Observer, the largest Gambian newspaper at the time. Bah was frequently targeted by government officials for criticizing Jammeh. After two and a half years, a pro-government editor began to censor Bah's column. Bah then began publishing articles anonymously on the oppressive regime's murders and torture practices in an online news site called Freedom Newspaper, which was operated by a Gambian exile in the U.S.

== Life as a refugee ==
In May 2006, Freedom Newspaper's website and emails were hacked by the government and Bah's identity was exposed, which led to The Gambia Police Force declaring a national manhunt to find him, as they circulated his name and photograph in the media. On May 29, 2006, at the age of 26, Bah undertook the dangerous journey to escape the country, first passing through Senegal with the help of human rights activists from the Media Foundation for West Africa to arrive at a refugee camp in Ghana, where he was accepted to be resettled in the United States. After spending a year at the refugee camp, Bah arrived in Rhode Island on May 24, 2007 and began his journey to resettlement with the help of the Dorcas International Institute (formerly the International Institute of Rhode Island), the largest immigration service in the state. He began working as an escrow representative at Rhode Island Housing and taking evening classes at The University of Rhode Island's Providence Feinstein Campus. Bah's wife, Teddi Jallow, joined him in the U.S. in 2009.

== Refugee pioneer work ==
Despite the challenges of navigating his new life in the United States, Bah found it easier than most refugees because he could already speak, read, and write English as a result of his former career as a journalist. He began volunteering at various organizations to help newly arrived refugees. After a few years, he worked with several refugee community leaders to establish the Center for Refugee Advocacy and Support, which brought to light the cultural nuances and social determinants of health affecting refugees in Rhode Island. The Center partnered with various health and educational institutions to promote integration, cultural bridge-building, research, and social services for refugees.

=== Advocacy for safe refugee housing ===
Through his work with the Center for Refugee Advocacy and Support, Bah discovered that refugee children were subject to the highest rate of lead poisoning per capita among all children in Rhode Island. He worked with local leaders to encourage federally-funded refugee resettlement agencies to change their policies in housing placement for refugees, coordinating with US State Department officials to ensure this policy change was realized in Rhode Island. A new policy ensured that refugees were placed only in lead-safe certified homes. From 2010 to 2015, Bah was invited to serve on the board of the Childhood Lead Action Project to strengthen safe housing for the refugee community. The Rhode Island Department of Health awarded Bah the Healthy Housing Advocacy Award in 2011 for his efforts.

=== Refugee Congress ===
From 2011 to 2019, Bah was invited to represent Rhode Island in the Refugee Congress hosted by the UNHCR (United Nations High Commissioner for Refugees) in Washington, DC. He advocated for "a robust U.S. refugee resettlement program", lecturing around the country. After leaving his role as the Rhode Island delegate of the Refugee Congress, Bah continues to offer training seminars, workshops, and speeches on international issues regarding the challenges and trauma refugees face; trauma-informed care; cultural attunement; and survivor leadership. He has spoken at various conferences, universities, and public fora, including Brown University, the United Nations in New York, and the UNHCR in Washington, DC.

=== Refugee Dream Center ===
During his first few years in the United States, Bah questioned why government support for resettled refugees lasted for only 6–8 months. After having experienced trauma, violence, or persecution in their home countries, refugees faced significant economic, social, and cultural obstacles towards self-sufficiency in their new country. In the hopes of addressing the gap between government-assisted resettlement and true integration for refugees, Bah started the non-profit organization Refugee Dream Center (RDC) in Providence, Rhode Island in 2015. As pronounced in their mission statement, the RDC aids "refugees' efforts towards self-sufficiency and integration… through culturally attuned programming." The post-resettlement agency provides refugees with social assistance and skills development, including case management; adult education (ESL, workforce development, and financial literacy); health promotion; youth mentoring; and advocacy. The RDC also serves as "a venue of culture and resource exchange for the refugee community of Rhode Island," which includes refugees from countries including the Congo, Somalia, Syria, and over 16 others. In describing the reason behind the name of the organization, Bah says, "I wanted to create inspiration for refugees, but also to inspire Americans to join the efforts to give refugees an opportunity to regain the humanity they might have lost because of the extreme sufferings they went through. The America I know, two things are there: possibilities and opportunities. And I wanted refugees to dream to obtain those. And I know it is possible."

== Continuing activism and community involvement ==
In 2017, Bah was able to return to The Gambia after a decade-long exile. His trip was an effort to reconnect with his home country and bring a sense of closure to his life in exile.

Bah spoke out against Donald Trump's muslim ban in 2018. In an opinion piece published in The Providence Journal, he wrote, "As this administration rejoices about this ruling, let us remind them of the millions of people suffering across the globe, who ask for only one thing — to be helped to survive, to eat and drink, to live in safety. Let us remind them that such policy is not a true representation of the American spirit of utmost goodness. Let us remind them that our voices will be strong and unwavering."

During the COVID-19 pandemic in the United States, Bah focused his and the RDC's efforts on assisting refugees with food security, financial assistance, and public outreach. The pandemic exacerbated existing inequalities and placed the refugee community at the highest risk of exposure. In response to such struggles, Bah and the RDC continued offering online English classes; made hundreds of calls each week to help clients access health and employment resources; delivered over $100,000 worth of food, supplies, and cash assistance to refugee families; kept the community informed about social distancing, vaccination, unemployment benefits, and more. Over the course of 2020, the Refugee Dream Center saw a rise in clientele, totaling over 2,000 refugees and immigrants, compared to 300 in the previous year.

In August 2021, Bah launched a private limited company called Attuned and Inclined LLC to offer trainings and interventions on trauma-informed care, cultural attunement, diversity, organizational development, leadership, youth mentoring, and mental health. Bah also established his focus on survivor leadership through two new initiatives: the Global Survivor Leadership Institute and the Dr. Omar Bah Foundation. The former will host an annual global conference and fellowship that amplify the voices of trauma survivors. The latter will offer direct services and interventions on leadership, human rights, health care, education, and basic needs for communities around the world.

=== 2022 Run for Congress ===
After Representative James Langevin of Rhode Island's 2nd congressional district announced he would not seek reelection, Bah was the first democrat to announce he would run for the open seat in the 2022 election.

If elected, Bah planned to push forward legislation to enact a major overhaul of the immigration system, provide more funding for early childhood education and support affordable housing. His priorities also included healthcare, crime, and climate change; and he is a supporter of a Green New Deal. If elected, Bah would have been the first Black person to represent Rhode Island in Congress.

Bah spoke against political polarization in Washington saying "I am not a career politician and therefore I hope to help minimize the political polarization and promote the interest of the American people". He also pledged not to "attack or disparage any candidate or opponent".

== Education ==
Bah received a national diploma in law from The Gambia Technical Training Institute in 2001. He earned a certificate in journalism at The Gambia Media Training Center in 2004. In 2010, Bah earned a bachelor's degree in communication studies with a minor in political science from The University of Rhode Island and a certificate in community economic development from Roger Williams University. He received a master's in public administration from Roger Williams University in 2014 and a master's degree in counseling psychology in global mental health from William James College in 2016. Bah also completed trauma treatment certification from Harvard Medical School through the Harvard Program in Refugee Trauma in 2013, after which he started practicing trauma-based therapy. He attained a doctoral degree in organizational leadership and psychology with an emphasis in neuropsychology from William James College in 2020.

== Academic work ==
Starting from 2017, Bah began to conduct research with a focus in survivor leadership. He interviewed a group of trauma survivors to formulate a set of four distinct qualities that characterize a survivor leader: voice, post-traumatic growth, service to humanity, and education. As part of the faculty for Harvard Medical School's Global Mental Health: Trauma and Recovery Certificate Program in April 2021, Bah presented his research study on trauma survivor leadership featured in the Harvard Medical School news article, "Global Impacts Trauma, health equity, human rights focus of HMS certificate course." Bah analyzed 46 participants' "physiological response to thinking about and narrating trauma, resilience, belonging, and experiencing a sense of well-being in life." In examining the factors that may explain the resilience of trauma survivors, Bah found that "community leaders who have suffered trauma have stronger resilience, greater well-being, and healthy physiological responses when discussing their trauma."

== Honors and awards ==
- 2011 Healthy Housing Advocacy Award, Rhode Island Department of Health
- 2015 'Rhode Islander of the Year' Award, Rhode Island Monthly Magazine
- 2016 John F. Kiffney Public Service Award, Providence Newspaper Guild
- 2017 Fellow, Paul V. Sherlock Center on Disabilities, Rhode Island College
- 2017 Red Bandana Award, Red Bandana Fund
- 2018 Refugee Congress Honor as the Delegate from Rhode Island and Founding Member of the Refugee Congress Advisory Board, UNHCR (United Nations High Commissioner for Refugees)
- 2018 Fellow, Vermont Leadership Education in Neurodevelopmental Disabilities (LEND), Association of University Centers on Disabilities
- 2019 Community Service Award, Oasis International
- 2019-2022 Fellow, Culture of Health Leaders, Robert Wood Johnson Foundation
- 2021 Young Alumni Achievement Award, Roger Williams University

== Publications ==
- Bah, Omar (2014). Africa's Hell on Earth: The Ordeal of an African Journalist. Tate Publishing & Enterprises. ISBN 978-1629022789.
