= Memsor Kamarake =

American celebrity wardrobe stylist

- Born: Harlem, New York
- Occupation: Celebrity wardrobe stylist

Memsor Kamarake is an American celebrity wardrobe stylist best known for his work with talk show host Wendy Williams as part of her "Glam Squad" alongside makeup artist Merrell Hollis and wig stylist Dominic Santiago. He previously collaborated with Williams's former wig stylists Antwon Jackson and Robyn Michele. He worked as an assistant for Vibe magazine at the inception of his career and has styled Beyoncé, Barack Obama, Megan Thee Stallion, and singer Ciara. He went on to serve as fashion director at Vibe for five years.

== Early life and career ==
Kamarake was born in Harlem, New York to immigrant parents from Sierra Leone, West Africa. His father was a diplomat, working in New York, (The Wayne Holtz Podcast, 16:32) and his mother was a seamstress. (The Wayne Holtz Podcast, 17:56) Kamarake went to college for computer engineering but decided to follow his passion of fashion, derived from his mother's creativity in her job. (The Wayne Holtz Podcast, 17:49) His first job was at GAP, starting out in sales and moving into window dressing (The Wayne Holtz Podcast, 18:20), where he got "one brain wave one day," the realization that if he could dress mannequins for window displays, he could "dress a human being." (The Wayne Holtz Podcast, 18:43). Spending his formative years in London, he became an avid follower of the work of Emil Wilbekin, a Vibe magazine editor, which cultivated his interest in fashion and print editorial arts. As Kamarake was read Vibe "religiously" and was "obsessed with it," he noticed Emil's byline was market editor, guiding him in the direction that perhaps he would like to be a market editor as well. (The Wayne Holtz Podcast, 18:51, 19:56) Kamarake then worked at a Ralph Lauren store which gave him firsthand experience with apparel, and he parlayed the experience into a move back across the Atlantic to New York. By chance encounter, Kamarake met Wilbekin, who not too long after became his boss when Kamarake obtained a position as an assistant at Vibe, where Wilbekin was editor-in-chief. Kamarake ultimately worked his way from assistant to market editor, a capacity in which he was working by 2002. He then worked up to occupying the position of fashion director, a capacity in which he worked from 2005-2009.

During this period, in June 2007, Kamarake styled Beyoncé for Vibe's Beyoncé Strips Down. He also styled the Dap-Kings, Chanel Iman, Eve, Mark Pitts, and Tanisha Scott and fashion-directed shoots featuring Chris Brown and others.

In Sept. 2007, Kamarake styled then-senator Barack Obama, for Vibe's cover. He then graduated to consulting fashion director, a position he held throughout 2012. He eventually became a freelancer, in which circumstance he came to work for Wendy Williams in 2012 after her third television season, having met Williams through her stylist, Merrell Hollis. (The Wayne Holtz Podcast, 27:13) Kamarake is frequently featured on Williams's After Show, runs her Instagram take-overs, and has appeared on her Facebook Live Q&A sessions.

As of Season 11 of the Wendy Williams Show, Kamarake ceased to serve on Williams's staff. In April 2020, he styled Megan Thee Stallion for the cover of Marie Claire.

== Other ventures ==
In 2007, Kamarake was a panelist alongside Jay Alexander, Selita Ebanks, and others at the Breaking Into Fashion Forum in New York City. In 2008, Kamarake partook in Salute to Black Men in Fashion at New York Fashion Week. In 2014, Kamarake worked as a style editor with designer LaQuan Smith. In 2019, Kamarake worked as a stylist for the NYC Pride Guide: WorldPride Edition under the direction of Gregory Wein. In 2019, Kamarake worked in the role of fashion editor, styling Regina King for the cover of Marie Claire.

== Personal life ==
Kamarake is gay and partakes in philanthropy surrounding LGBT causes.

== Awards and honors ==
- In 2019 Kolor Magazine placed Kamarake on their list "22 Black Men Dominating As Celebrity Fashion Stylists."
- In 2017, Fashion Bomb Daily listed Kamarake as one of their Black History Month Future Legends.
- In 2015, the African television channel Spice placed Kamarake on their list "5 African Stylists to Know."
- In 2008, Kamarake was a Black Men Rule honoree via a Vibe event at New York Fashion Week.

== Podcasts ==
Date	Show	Episode	Role
Aug. 10, 2017	The Wayne Holtz Podcast	"Memsor Kamarake: Head Stylist to Wendy Williams (Stylist to the Stars in General)"	
