= Gambian Americans =

Americans of Gambian birth or descent

Total population
- 3,035 (2000 US census); 11,000 (Gambian-born, 2008-2012; American Community Survey Briefs)

Regions with significant populations
- New York, Massachusetts, Pennsylvania, Ohio, Michigan, Illinois, Wisconsin, Delaware, Maryland, Virginia, Kentucky, North Carolina, Georgia, Florida, Minnesota, Kansas, Texas, Washington, Colorado and California

Languages
- American English, French, Mandinka, Wolof, Fula, Serer

Religion
- Islam, Christianity

Related ethnic groups
- African Americans, American groups of West Africa (Senegalese, Bissau-Guinean etc.), English

Gambian Americans are an ethnic group of Americans of Gambian descent. There are about 8000 Gambians living in the United States, involving themselves in activities ranging from business and entrepreneurship to college education. Additionally, during the Atlantic slave trade, many Africans from what is now The Gambia were traded and were subsequently sold by Europeans and Americans into forced labor in the United States. Gambian immigrants arriving in the United States include members of ethnic groups such as the Mandinka, Wolof, Fula, Jola, and Serahule.

Many Gambians have emigrated to the United States since the 1970s with the goal of entering into higher education. While some of these students returned home after completing their studies, others adopted the United States as a permanent residence, attracting friends and family to the country. Locations with significant Gambian communities include Chicago, Atlanta, the Seattle area, Minnesota, Bronx, New York, Texas, and Washington, D.C. Most Gambians living in the United States practice Islam or Christianity.

== History ==
=== Atlantic slave trade ===
The first people from what is now The Gambia arrived to the United States as slaves during the Atlantic slave trade. In 1588, the claimant to the Portuguese throne, António, Prior of Crato, sold exclusive trade rights on the Gambia River to English merchants (including the slave trade). Letters patent from Queen Elizabeth I confirmed the grant. So, The Gambia, since the sixteenth to nineteenth century, was an important slave port in the Senegambia area (along with others as Saint Louis, the Goree Island, Bissau or Cacheu), both for the United States and Latin America (Spanish bought many slaves to the English, French and Portuguese merchants). Therefore, an important part of the slaves were, among others, of this part of Africa.

Slaves from present-day The Gambia imported to present-day United States belonged to ethnicities such as the Mandinka and Bambara people. So many slaves of the present-day Gambia were Muslims. Slaves from Senegambia staged some prominent revolts in the current United States. Thus, in 1765, while the brigantine Hope was bringing slaves from the coast of Senegal and The Gambia to Connecticut, the slaves provoked a revolt aboard of the brigantine, leveraging the murder of the captain (who had beaten several of his crewmen) for some crewmens. In the revolt, the slaves killed one crew member and wounded several others. On this day their revolt was suppressed by killing seven of them.

Most of slaves from The Gambia were imported to South Carolina, Virginia, Maryland (where, according to some historians, most of all slaves, although according to others, the most of them were Igbo of Nigeria) and Georgia. Senegambian and Guinean slaves were imported to those states probably because those slaves could favor the rice plantations of those places already that they were familiar with rice plantations which was commonly grown in Senegambia and Guinea. In the rest of the states having Gambian slaves (such as New York or Pennsylvania), they were very scarce (only hundreds of individuals from Senegambia were imported there). While it is known that all slaves exported to New Jersey (only 176 slaves) and all Senegambian slaves which were exported to Rhode Island, New Hampshire, and Pennsylvania were from The Gambia. So well, like most of the slaves of Senegambia arrived in Massachusetts, Virginia, Maryland, Georgia and South Carolina. So, famous is the case of the slave, supposedly native from the present Gambia, Kunta Kinte (who arrived to the modern United States in the Lord Ligonier ship), thank to a story written by Alex Haley and based, partially, on a true story."

=== Modern times ===
The Gambians have emigrated to the United States of voluntary form, as a minimum, since the 1970s. Many of them migrated to Chicago. Many Gambians have emigrated to the United States with the goal of entering higher education to which they have no access to in their native country. Many of these students returned home after completing their studies, excelling in politics and business.

Many Gambians who have set the United States as a permanent residence, have attracted friends and other family members to the United States. Gambians of United States exert jobs such as accounting, education, medicine and hotel management.

== Tradition ==
=== Food ===
Gambian Americans tend to carry traditions from The Gambia to their homes in the US. Some of the most notable include traditional food, traditional attire and other traditional practices. The most common dishes served in Gambian homes is Benachin (Jollof Rice), Domoda, Chew, Supa Kanja, Plasas, Yassa, Afra etc. Most of these dishes share common ingredients such as rice, fish, tomatoes, cooking oil, onions, peppers and different herbs.

=== Traditional Attire ===
Despite living in the US, Gambians maintain and shows its heritage and traditions in different ways, that includes traditional attire. Gambians in the US are usually recognized by their vibrant traditional outfits made out of vibrant 100% cotton textiles. Gambians are mostly Muslims and due to its Islamic influence, traditional wears are mostly covering from head to toes including long sleeves for women and neck to toes for men.

Some of the most notable Gambian attires for both men and women include Grand mbubu, Kaftan.

== Organizations ==
Some of the Gambian organizations more highlights in United States are: The Gambian American Association, United Gambians Association and Gambia Association of Chicago.

The Gambian American Association (GAA) was established in Washington, D.C. Metropolitan Area. The association has held events such as anniversary of Gambia's independence.

It is also remarkable the United Gambians Association (UGA). This organization, not-for-profit, non-political and non-religious, work with Gambian immigrants, their children, families, schools and communities in the U.S. UGA is engaged in activities such as strengthening of ties in the Gambian community in exile, helping Gambian immigrants and facilitate their integration into American society and the voluntary contribution, both in The Gambia and the U.S., areas such as HIV/AIDS, natural disasters, immigration and malaria. The association also offers free tutoring services to Gambian immigrants and their families in logistics support, funding and emotional support in an emergency situation, like the death of a family member or immigration issues.

The Gambia Association of Chicago was founded in 1998 to promote mutual aid and strengthen the bonds of the Gambian community in that city. The organization develops monthly meetings and raises funds to support the Gambians in Chicago and his return to his homeland. In addition, this organization also organizes Midwest Gambian Associations Conference the Labor Day weekend, uniting Gambian communities from several states in the country (Gambian communities in Michigan, Minnesota, Wisconsin, Ohio, Washington and Kansas) to coordinate fundraising activities and cultural, build a regional network and discuss topics of interest. Thus the Midwest Gambian Associations Conference invites prominent members of the community to talk about of the social, political and economic most important issues of Gambia. These activities are combined with lunches, dances, and a soccer tournament. In addition, the community also helps members financially when they are born, die or become ill.

Furthermore, in the 1970s, Gambian students played an important role in the formation of the African Student Union of the University of Illinois at Chicago, city where they establish ties with other African groups, such as the Senegalese. Furthermore, Gambians lead the Move, an African organization Chicago nonprofit founded in 1983 to try to solve the educational and political problems of Africans. Thus, we have organized forums, holidays (such as Liberation Day in Africa), and literature from current problems.

== Notable people ==
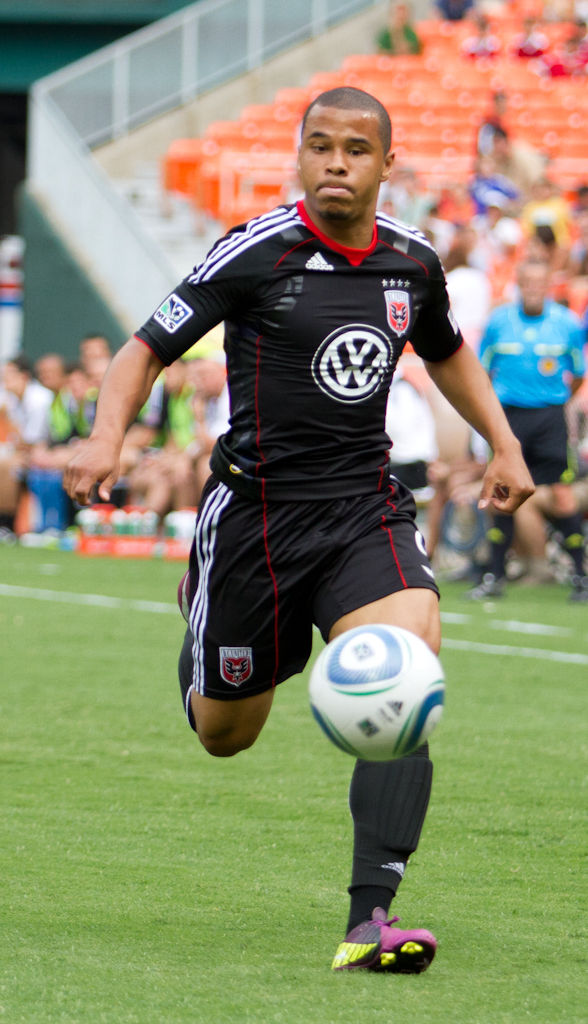
Charlie Davies

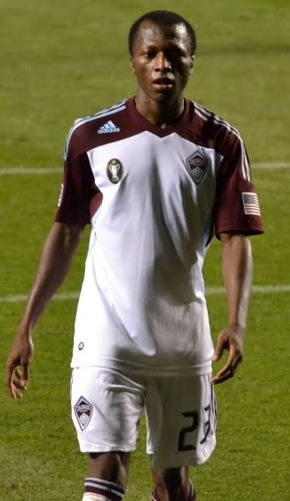
Sanna Nyassi

- Omar Bah
- Samba Baldeh
- Ousman Krubally (born 1988), Gambian-American basketball player in the Israeli Basketball Premier League
- Al Njie
- Charlie Davies
- Kelefa Sanneh
- Fatou Camara
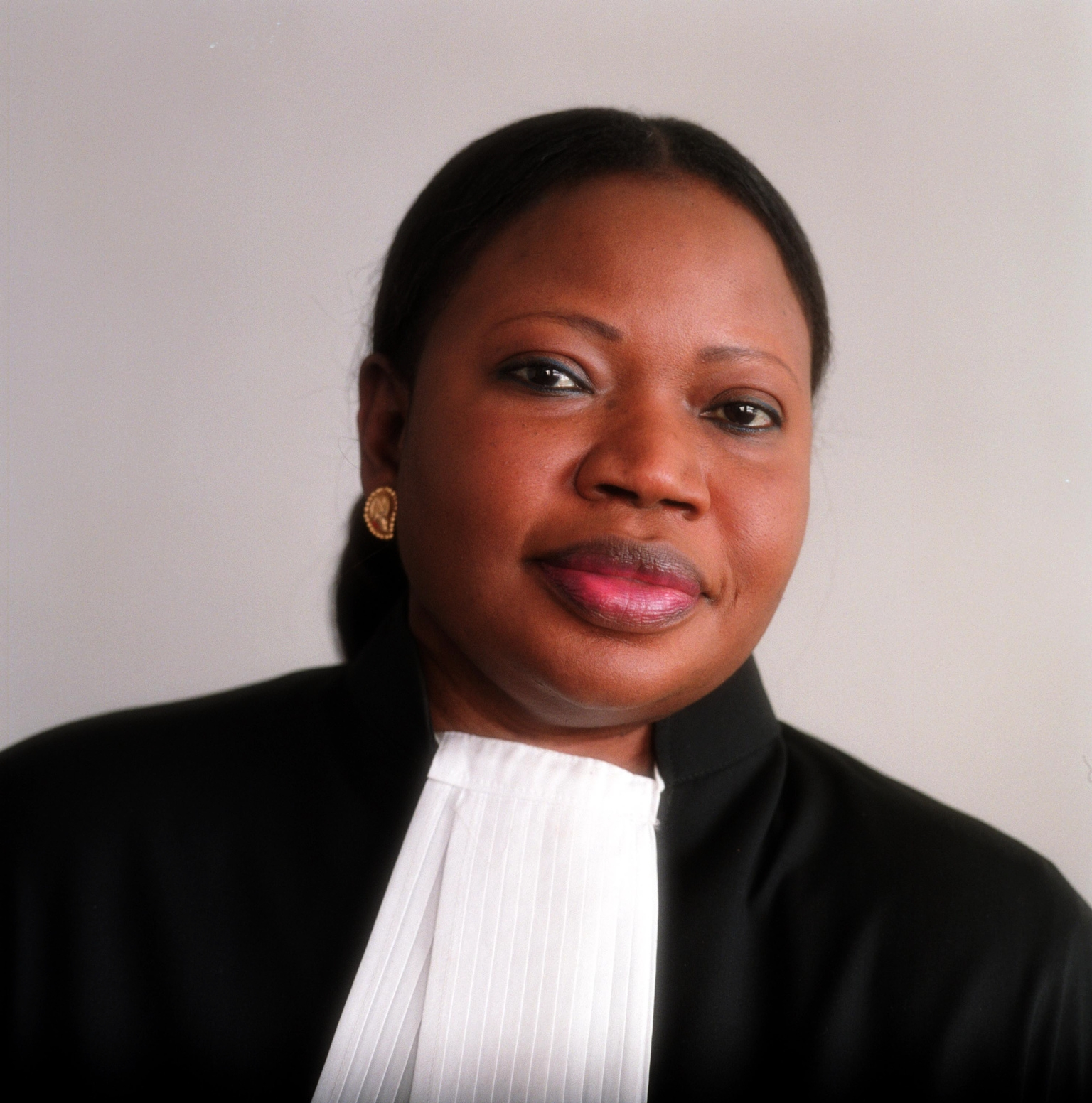
- Fatou Bensouda official portrait, 2008
  Fatou Bensouda
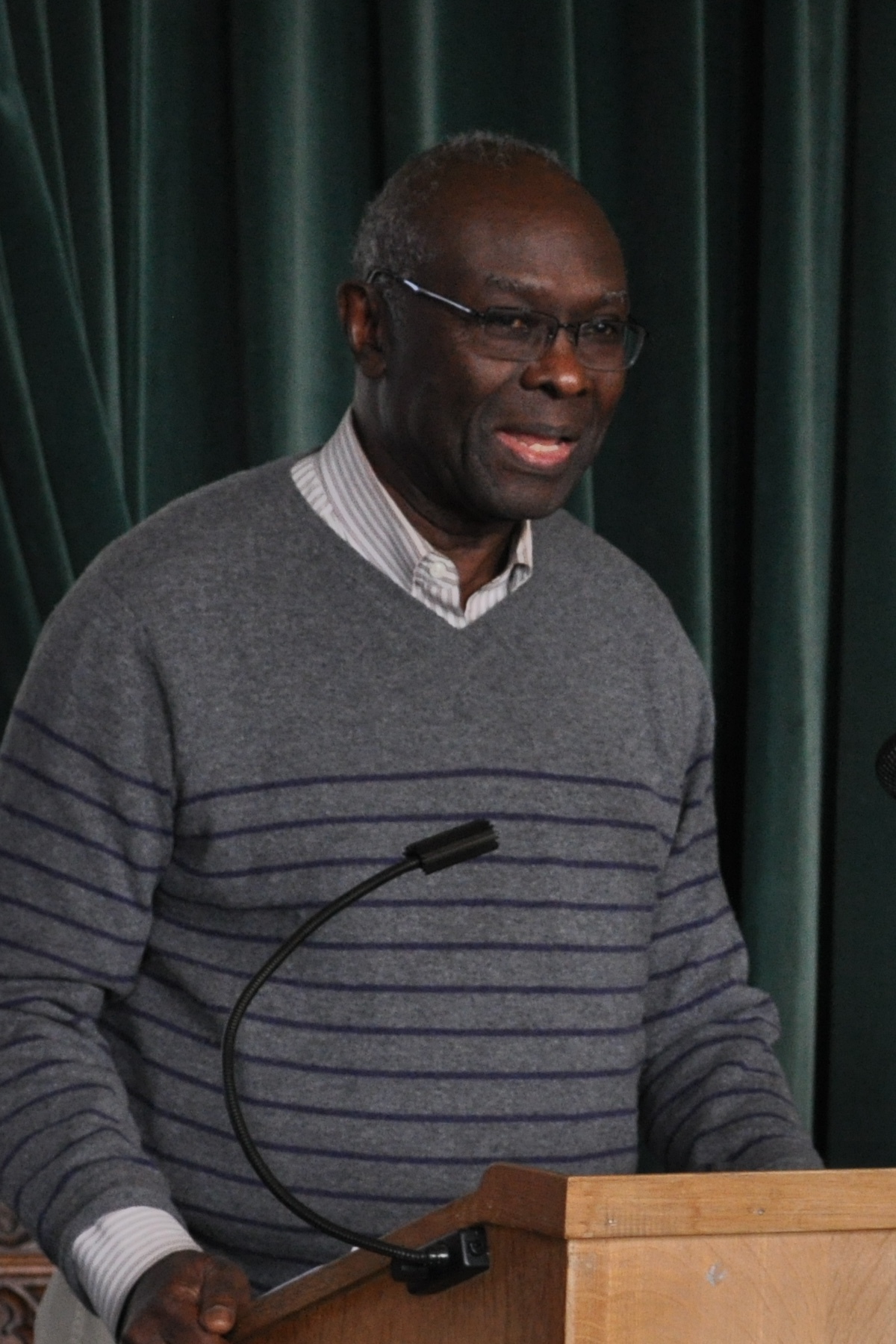
- Lamin Sanneh in 2014
  Lamin Sanneh

== See also ==
- The Gambia–United States relations
