= Sierra Leonean Americans =

Americans of Sierra Leonean birth or descent

Total population
- Ancestries and ethnic origin; 2019 American Community Survey; 29,153 Sierra Leonean-born, 2013; 35,213

Regions with significant populations
- Found in New York City; Boston; Philadelphia; Columbus; Lansing; Chicago; Milwaukee; Baltimore; Washington, D.C. metropolitan area; New York; Massachusetts; Pennsylvania; Ohio; Michigan; Illinois; Wisconsin; Delaware; Maryland; Virginia; Kentucky; North Carolina; South Carolina; Georgia; Florida; Minnesota; Kansas; Iowa; Texas; Washington; Oregon; Colorado; California

Languages
- American English; Krio; Limba; Mende; Temne

Religion
- Islam, Christianity (Protestant majority, Catholic minority)

Related ethnic groups
- Sierra Leone Creole people; Black Nova Scotians; Guinean Americans; Liberian Americans; African Americans

Sierra Leonean Americans are an ethnic group of Americans of full or partial Sierra Leonean ancestry. This includes Sierra Leone Creoles whose ancestors were African American Black Loyalists freed after fighting on the side of the British during the American Revolutionary War. Some African Americans trace their roots to indigenous enslaved Sierra Leoneans exported to the United States between the 18th and early 19th century. In particular, the Gullah people of partial Sierra Leonean ancestry, fled their owners and settled in parts of South Carolina, Georgia, and the Sea Islands, where they still retain their cultural heritage. The first wave of Sierra Leoneans to the United States, after the slavery period, was after the Sierra Leone Civil War in the 1990s and early 2000s. According to the American Community Survey, there are 34,161 Sierra Leonean immigrants living in the United States.

== History ==
=== Slavery ===
The first people from present Sierra Leone who were in the United States were slaves imported in this country between the 18th and 19th centuries. The first slaves from Sierra Leone arrived to the United States are some of the Gullah ancestries, or (in Georgia) Geechee, which were sent from Africa or since the Caribbean, particularly Barbados, to serve as free labor for the cultivation of rice, whose area of cultivation was the southeast coast of the modern United States. Indeed, many slavers employed slaves from the West African coasts because their great ability to work in the rice plantations. The Sierra Leonean slaves belonged to peoples such as the Mendes, Temnes, Vai, Loko, the Mandingo (also known as Mandinka), Sherbro and Limba people and some of them were Muslims (Mandinka). Slaves from Sierra Leone made up 24% of the slaves arriving imported to these place. Most of the slaves of Sierra Leone were imported to southeast, mainly to South Carolina (where 70% of those slaves arrived. More than 18,300 slave of modern-day Sierra Leona arrived in South Carolina, settling in places such as Saint Helena Island) and Georgia (where 15% of them arrived) There were more of 3,900 slaves from this region, the majority of the slaves of the colony), followed, over long distances, mainly by Virginia, Maryland and Florida (those places had in total more than 11% in total of the slaves from Sierra Leone in the present U.S., having between 900 and 1,000 of those slaves depending on the American state). Many of these slaves hailed from Bunce Island in the Sierra Leone River.

Moreover, between 1776 and 1785, during the American Revolution, many Gullah of Sierra Leoneans origin fled from the United States and emigrated to Nova Scotia, Canada, after the abolition of slavery in this country. Subsequently, in 1787 the British helped 400 freed slaves from the United States, Nova Scotia (many of them were Gullah), and Great Britain to return to Sierra Leone, where they founded the colony Freetown in 1792. The descendants of the settlers are the Sierra Leone Creole people.

In 1841, a group of slaves that traveled on the ship La Amistad, whose destination was the island of Cuba, made an uprising against the merchants who drove the ship and seized of it. Most of the slaves were Mende people, but also had people of other tribes such as the Temne. The Amistad arrived to the American coasts and the U.S. Supreme Court freed them from slavery. Most of those slaves returned to Africa. Only some of them remained in the United States, acquiring the American citizenship. Slavery was finally abolished after of 1865, after the American Civil War.

=== Recent immigration ===
They did not emigrate to the United States again until the 1970s, when a new group of Sierra Leoneans, mostly students, arrived to study at American universities. Some received "legal residence status" (or married an American), enabling them to live permanently in the United States. Many became doctors, lawyers and accountants.

The number of Sierra Leoneans who emigrated to the United States grew throughout the 80's due to the majority poverty and political problems suffered by the Sierra Leonean population. Many of them were students although they also worked to help their families or sent them money if they lived in Sierra Leone and encouraged them to emigrate. In addition, although some of the Sierra Leoneans who completed their studies returned to Sierra Leone, other Sierra Leoneans decided to stay in the US and obtain legal residency status.

The 1990 American Census showed that 4,627 people linked your origins with Sierra Leone, many of them American citizens. Between 1990 and 1996 another many Sierra Leoneans migrated to the US, mostly fleeing the civil war. Many of them arrived to the country with visitor, as well as with student visas. During this period, more of 7,150 Sierra Leoneans with a legal status emigrated to the United States. After 1996, many Sierra Leoneans legally emigrate to the US thanks they had a refugee status and relatives residing in the US. By 1999, about 2,500 Sierra Leoneans had emigrate to the US annually, according to The United Nations High Commission for Refugees. The recent refugees tend to have lower education than earlier migrants, who have University degrees.

== Demography ==
Currently, 80% of African Americans who are descendants of enslavesd Africans have some ancestors that came from Bunce Island in Sierra Leone. Most Sierra Leonean immigrants reside in the Baltimore- Washington, D.C., metropolitan area. Other Sierra Leonean communities are settled in suburbs of Alexandria, Fairfax, Arlington, Falls Church, and Woodbridge in Virginia, and in Landover, Lanham, Cheverly, Silver Spring, and Bethesda in Maryland. There are also Sierra Leonean communities in the Boston and Los Angeles metropolitan areas, and in New Jersey, Florida, Pennsylvania, New York, Texas, Oregon and Ohio.

Most Sierra Leoneans are Muslims and practitioners of native cultures, but there are also many Christians. Sierra Leonean Americans communicate in English, either as a first or second language, due to the British colonial history. However, Krio is the lingua franca and primary language of communication among diverse groups of Sierra Leoneans living abroad although a few still speak ethnic languages reflecting their unique heritage. Many Sierra Leonean residents in the USA work in two or three jobs to reach enough salary to help their families in their country, whilst some others have university degrees. Indeed, while some Sierra Leoneans arrived in the United States to pursue university studies, some are already holders of degrees from British universities or from Fourah Bay College in Freetown. Many Sierra Leoneans residing in the USA incorporate their children to secret organizations of Sierra Leonean origin, which teach them the cultures own of their tribes. Sierra Leonean Americans have also been helped by many former Peace Corps volunteers who worked in Sierra Leone. In the US, many Sierra Leoneans have established relationships (and have even intermarried) with people from other cultures and nationalities, especially with other African immigrants.

== Gullah and Geechee people ==
The Gullah, or (in Georgia) Geechee, are descendants of enslaved Africans that were sent from Africa or since the Caribbean, particularly Barbados, to serve as free labor for the cultivation of rice, whose area of cultivation was the southeast coast of the modern United States, and that still live in Sea Islands and the coastal areas of South Carolina and Georgia. Slaves from Sierra Leone made up 24% of the slaves arriving in this place. Many slavers employed slaves from the West African coasts because their great ability to work in the rice plantations. Indeed, most of the slaves that were imported to southeast coast of the United States came from the West African's rice-growing region, established mainly in Sierra Leone, through the Bunce Island.

So although the ancestors of the Gullah come from many places on the coast of West Africa, many of the elements that are part of their material culture, food (rice) and crops (indigo) are the same as those held by Sierra Leoneans. Thus, the Gullah have the same types and capacities of textiles, fishing, foodways, folktales, vernacular architecture, music, basket making, net making, language, belief systems, pottery and woodcarving that the Sierra Leoneans. So, Dr. Hair, a British historian, said the "startling" fact that all texts in African Gullah dialect are written in languages spoken in Sierra Leone. Most African texts gathered by historian Turner are belonging to the Mende language. But Dr. Cabello also said that an "unusually large proportion" of the four thousand African names and personal loans in the Gullah language come from Sierra Leone. He estimated that twenty-five percent of African names and twenty percent of African vocabulary words came from the Sierra Leonean languages, principally Mende and Vai(one of the Gullah words of origin not Sierra leonean is the same term "Gullah", that may derive from Angola).

The Gullah/Geechee people speak a language similar to Sierra Leonean Krio, a creole deriving from English, indigenous West African languages, and other European languages. The Gullah language also has varying degrees of influences from African languages such as Ewe, Mandinka, Igbo, Twi, Yoruba, and Mende.

== Organizations ==
Although Sierra Leoneans in United States belong to a variety of ethnic and religious groups have been created organizations to help Sierra Leonean community entire. So, the Chicagoland Association of Sierra Leoneans, formed in 1996, is a nonprofit organization to unite Sierra Leoneans in a community, socialize newcomers, and help to Sierra Leoneans living in Chicago and abroad. Also in 1975 it created one organization named Tegloma ("let's progress" in Mende) in Washington DC, the largest nonprofit, nonpolitical Sierra Leonean organization in the world, and it help Sierra Leoneans in te world and promoting Mende culture, the culture of the second largest ethnic group in Sierra Leone. There is an organization created in New York on behalf of health care providers that represent nursing. In 2008 the Sierra Leone Nurses Association (SLNA) was started in New York, in honor of the original SLNA started originally in Sierra Leone in 1961. Following the first chapter in the USA started in 2007 in California. And worldwide chapters since. There is a union organization called Union of Sierra Leone organizations in New York (USLO) in 2010.

== Notable people ==
- Franklyn Ajaye
- Aliyah Bah
- Apha Saidu Bangura
- Shaka Bangura
- Ishmael Beah
- Namina Forna
- Sallieu Bundu
- Joseph Cinqué
- Will Claye
- Sarah Culberson
- Michaela DePrince
- Delphine Fawundu
- Bill Hamid
- Nikyatu Jusu
- Leeroy Wilfred Kabs-Kanu
- Abdul Kallon
- Hafsatu Kamara
- Kei Kamara
- Memsor Kamarake
- Augustine Kposowa
- Michael Lahoud
- Adetokumboh M'Cormack
- Victor Mansaray
- Sahr Ngaujah
- Mohamed Sanu
- Ansu Sesay
- Israel Sesay
- Jaxon Smith-Njigba
- Jacob Stroyer
- Jeneba Tarmoh
- Abdul Thompson Conteh
- Frances Tiafoe
- Nate Tongovula
- Thomas DeSaille Tucker
- Desiree Venn Frederic
- Abiodun Williams
- Gibril Wilson
- Tejan Koroma

== See also ==
- Sierra Leone – United States relations
- Sierra Leone Creole people
- Sierra Leoneans in the United Kingdom
