= Selamawi Asgedom =

Ethiopian writer

- Born: 29 September 1976 (age 49); Adi Wahla, Tigray, Ethiopia
- Occupations: Public speaker Author

Selamawi Asgedom (Tigrinya: ሰላማዊ ሃእለአብ አስገዶም; born in Adi Wahla, Ethiopia on 29 September 1976), or Mawi Asgedom for short, is an author, public speaker, and a refugee of Ethiopian and Eritrean origin.

== Biography ==
Mawi was born in northern Ethiopia, in the province of Tigray. For about two years of his childhood, he was separated from his father, when he and his siblings and mother had to flee to Sudan to avoid the war in Ethiopia. Mawi was seven years old when he and his family arrived in the U.S. in 1983, sponsored by World Relief. They had spent the previous three years in a refugee camp in Sudan. He grew up in the Chicago suburb of Wheaton, Illinois. He played on his high school basketball team and ran track, the best in his league. He graduated with top honors from Harvard University, receiving a degree in American history and giving the commencement address at his graduation in 1999. He is the author of Of Beetles and Angels: A Boy's Remarkable Journey from a Refugee Camp to Harvard and The Code: The 5 Secrets of Teen Success.

Mawi's autobiography, Of Beetles and Angels was selected by Springfield, Pennsylvania as their community book, and 2,378 people read it there. Day-time television host Oprah Winfrey named her interview of Mr. Asgedom as one of her 20 Unforgettable Moments in October 2005.

Of Beetles and Angels was also chosen as the first-ever Evanston, Illinois, citywide reading program with events planned throughout the 2007–2008 school year. Mr. Asgedom visited with middle school readers throughout the year. Mawi's memoir was also read by the city of Philadelphia including Hatboro-Horsham High School as part of the 'One Book, One School' program

Mawi has four children and lives in Illinois.
