= Jem Spectar =

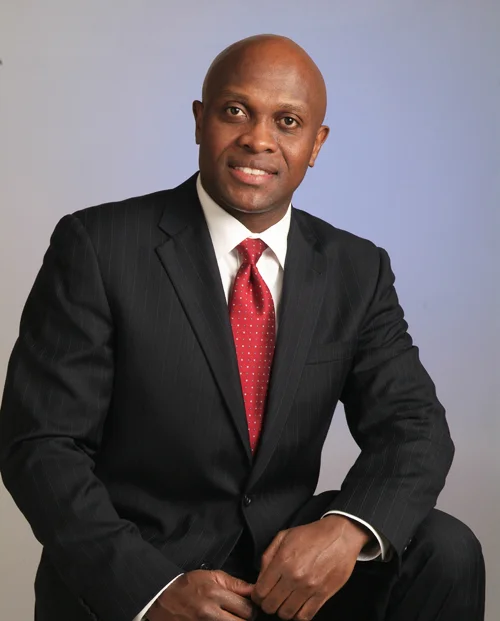
Spectar photographed in 2017

Jem Spectar is the president of the University of Pittsburgh at Johnstown as of January 2007. Previously, he had been provost/vice president for academic affairs and professor at Western Oregon University; associate provost and professor at the University of Scranton; director of studies and lecturer at Princeton University; and assistant dean and associate professor of law at the University of La Verne College of Law. Spectar earned his Bachelor of Arts in international studies at the University of La Verne, an MBA from Frostburg State University, a Master of Arts from The George Washington University, the Juris Doctor from the University of Maryland Law School, and the Master of Arts in politics and the Doctor of Philosophy in political science from the Claremont Graduate University.

He was born in Cameroon and immigrated to the United States after college.
