= Bissau-Guinean Americans =

Americans of Bissau-Guinean birth or descent

Bissau-Guinean American
Bissau-Guinean-Americanos (Portuguese)

Total population
- 1,903 (2015 US census)

Regions with significant populations
- Savannah, Georgia, Charleston, South Carolina, Newark, New Jersey, California, Chicago, Illinois, New York, Louisiana

Languages
- Guinea-Bissau Creole, American English, Portuguese, Porglish, African-American English

Religion
- Islam, Animism, Christianity

Related ethnic groups
- Portuguese Americans; Guinean Americans; Senegalese Americans; Cape Verdean Americans; Angolan Americans; Brazilian Americans; Macanese Americans; African Americans

Bissau-Guinean Americans are Americans of Bissau-Guinean descent. As was the case with almost all current West African coastal countries (and some of Central Africa), the first people in the United States from present-day Guinea-Bissau were imported as slaves. Thus, in the 21st century, there are many African Americans who have discovered, through DNA analysis, they descend mainly or at least partly, from Bissau-Guinean enslaved people.

== History ==
Between the fifteenth and nineteenth centuries, Guinea-Bissau belonged to a wide region of West Africa now called Senegambia, a very important region in the slavery trade in Africa and that had, between other slave ports, Cacheu and Bissau, been occupied by the Portuguese from the late fifteenth century (as other African places). So, since the late 15th century and with the cooperation of some local tribes, the Portuguese not only entered into the slave trade, but also imported large numbers of Senegambians (primarily of Bissau and Cacheu) and other Africans to the Western Hemisphere via Cape Verde. The local African rulers in Guinea, who prospered greatly from the African slave trade, had no interest in allowing the Europeans any further inland than the fortified coastal settlements where the trading took place; Bissau, Cacheu and Bolama. The Portuguese, after buying slaves from African kings and aristocracies, sold them to the European merchants (Spanish, English, French, Dutch, Swedish).

It is estimated that of the approximately 388,000 African slaves who arrived in the modern United States, almost 92,000 (24 percent) were Senegambians, many of them from Bissau port. In the early decades of immigration to the Chesapeake Bay before 1700, most of slaves were from Senegambia (almost 6,000), being about 31,000 people by the end of the forced migration and representing almost a third of all Senegambian slaves arrived in modern United States. About 45,000 Senegambians were settled in the coastal Low Country of The Carolinas and Georgia (where they were 21 percent of African slaves) and another over 7,000 were imported in northern colonies (forming about 28 percent of the total of slaves arrived there). Meanwhile, almost 9,000 Senegambians — although mostly Bambara or Mandinka people — were imported to the Gulf region, especially to Louisiana, where they were about 40 percent of the African slaves.

So, according to Justin Martin, slaves of day-present Guinea Bissau are some of the slaves who contributed to form the Gullah culture, mixing their culture and language with other peoples of African descent present there (and coming from places such as the current Senegal, Guinea, Sierra Leone, Liberia, and Angola). On 1841, the consul of Guinea Bissau, Ferdinand Gardner, reported a very important USA commerce de slaves in Cacheu-Bissau.

So, in the 2000 census, fewer than 300 people affirmed to be of Bissau-Guinean origin or descent. There has been a growing acknowledgment of descendants affirming their Bissau-Guinean ancestry and practices from the original traditions of African tribes such as; Balanta, Fulani, and Brame. The Balanta in specific have acknowledged their descendants in America and rebuilt cultural heritage amongst their diaspora.

== Balanta American ==
Balanta Americans are people in the United States that maintain an identity of a varying level within the Balanta ethnic group. In which the United States is their chief place of residence (and also have US citizenship). The Balanta Americans have a very distinct Creole culture, as a branch of the African-American lineage, they have maintained original cultural customs through oral history or genealogy despite the institution of American chattel slavery.

In addition, slaves from current day Guinea-Bissau hailed from the Balanta were enslaved mainly by the Portuguese and sold to the British or Americans via Cacheu. Many Balanta slaves imported to modern day United States from Guinea-Bissau we're sold as war captives from confrontation with the Portuguese and Bijago people. Guinean slaves in America we're distinctively sent to Georgia, Cheakspeare and Louisiana.

The native tongue of the Balanta people is spoken principally in Guinea-Bissau, with communities in other parts of Africa, Europe and the Americas.

== Fulani American ==
Fulani are people in the United States that maintain a cultural identity of various levels from the Fulani ethnic groups and now call the United States home. Most speak Fulfulde as well as English fluently and Arabic on various levels. The first wave of Fulani immigrants arrived as a result of the Atlantic Slave trade. Recent Fulani arrivals immigrated to the United States during the 1990s. They now make up a large percentage of the Muslim communities across America.

== See also ==
- List of Bissau-Guineans
- Gullah
- Cajuns
- Jazz
- Cashew
- Djembe
- Guinea-Bissau–United States relations
