= Penda Diakité =

Malian-American visual artist

Penda Diakité (born 1992) is a Malian-American visual artist known for her mixed-media collages and film work. Born in Portland, Oregon, she grew up between the United States and Mali, West Africa. Diakité's work explores black female identity, often tying in historical West African culture and traditions.

Penda Diakité
| Born | 1992 Portland, Oregon, USA |
| Education | California Institute Of The Arts |
| Website | pendadiakite.com |

== Background and education ==
Diakité was born in 1992 in Portland, Oregon to artists Baba Wagué Diakité (ceramicist and author) and Ronna Neuenschwander (sculptor). She grew up between the United States and Mali, West Africa where she spent much of her time in her parents’ art studio creating alongside them and learning West African history and traditional Malian arts such as bogolanfini.

At age 11 she published her first children’s book, I Lost My Tooth In Africa with Scholastic Press which was later featured on Reading Rainbow. Her storytelling quickly merged into film and she spent her adolescent years studying and creating film under her Oregon-based mentor, documentary filmmaker William Donker.

She later studied film and video at California Institute of the Arts (2010-2014) and received a Bachelor in Fine Arts with a minor in Cultural Studies.

Diakité moved to Los Angeles in 2016, establishing her career in the Arts.

In 2018 Diakité had her first major art show, 'Made in America', at the Substrate Gallery in Los Angeles.

== Career ==
Diakité is best known for her mixed-media collage work, often studies of female figures made from compositing images depicting African history, popular media’s portrayal of black people, race and gender constructs. She has also produced documentary and experimental works in film and video which exhibited in festivals throughout the world. Her film works center around the same themes of West African history, race and gender constructs.

== Exhibitions ==
=== Solo exhibitions ===
- Mousso-Ya (Womanhood), Band Of Vices Gallery, Los Angeles, CA (November, 2021)
- Diary of a White Black Girl, Nych Gallery, Chicago, IL (May 2021)
- The Cutting Edge, Rogue Gallery, Medford, OR (September 2021)
- Made In America, Substrate Gallery, (Sponsored by The Dean Collection), Los Angeles, CA (2018)
- Adama-den: Humankind, Guardino Gallery; Portland, OR (2018)
- Reflection: Hakili Jagabo, Organic Modernism; Los Angeles, CA (2018)

== Film screenings ==
- Words From A Silence, film gallery Schräge; Kassel, Germany (2017)
- Words From A Silence and Diary of Reflection, RACC’s Night Life: Bodies in Motion, Bodies at Rest; Portland, OR (2016)
- Words From A Silence and Diary of Reflection, 22nd Annual African American Marketplace Festival; Los Angeles, CA (2016)
- Words From A Silence, San Diego Underground Film Festival; San Diego, CA (2016)
- Words From A Silence, ‘Video Guerrilha Campinas’; São Paulo, Brazil (2015)
- Diary of Reflection, Afro Punk Fest; Brooklyn, NY (2015)
- Words From A Silence, Diary of Reflection, Striped, Un Monde de Femmes, Bombs are Toys, in ‘Attaquer Le Visible’ at La Mutinerie; Paris, France (2015)
- Words From A Silence, Positivus Festival; N Latvia, Salacgriva (2015)
- Words From A Silence, Ann Arbor Film Festival Expanding Frames Panel Series; Ann Arbor, MI (2015)
- Words From A Silence, 25th Cascade Festival of African Films; Portland, OR (2015)
- Words From A Silence, Roy and Edna Disney RedCat Theater; Los Angeles, CA (2015)
- Tanti’s Winter Vacation, Roy and Edna Disney RedCat Theater; Los Angeles, CA (2013)
- Diary of Reflection, Riverside International Film Festival; Riverside, CA (2013)
- Un Monde de Femmes, Riverside International Film Festival; Riverside, CA (2013)
- Tanti’s Winter Vacation, 23rd Cascade Festival of African Films; Portland, OR (2013)
- Diary of Reflection, Roy and Edna Disney RedCat Theater; Los Angeles, CA (2012)
- Welcome to Mali, 16th Cascade Festival of African Films; Portland, OR (2008)

== Awards ==
- The Dean Collection 20 Artists Award, (The Dean Collection, founded by Kasseem “Swizz Beatz” Dean and Alicia Keys)
- BETAir Artist in Residency, Black Entertainment Television
- Children’s Africana Book Award, Best Book for Young Children
- Best Book for Young Children ALA Notable Children’s Book
- The Monarch Award; Illinois K-3 Children’s Choice Award
- Notable Book in Language Arts, National Council of Teachers of English Conference in Nashville, TN
- Featured Book of the Month; Read On Wisconsin 2006 New York Public Library list of
- New York Public Library list of “100 Titles for Reading and Sharing”

== Publications ==
=== Art ===
- 2020 Powerhouse Lena Waithe and Rishi Rajani Take AD inside their Los Angeles Office, Architectural Digest
- 2020 An Interview With Penda Diakité, Arts Help
- 2019 BETAir, Black Entertainment Television
- 2019 Scholastic Magazine, Story Works featuring I Lost my Tooth In Africa by Penda Diakite
- 2019 Art Reveal Magazine, cover and featured artist
- 2019 Agbowo Magazine, cover and featured artist
- 2019 Plastiq Magazine Penda Diakite Art
- 2018 Swizz Beatz and Alicia Keys Launch New Art Grant..., Hyperallergic
- 2018 The Culture Hub, Swizz Beatz, Alicia Keys and the Dean Collection bless 20 diverse artists
- 2018 LA Sentinel Penda Diakité Showcases Her Art at the Substrate Gallery
- 2018 Penda Diakité Awarded art grant, The Skanner
- 2018 Interview with artist Penda Diakité, Artfriconn
- 2018 Penda Diakité’s Art Explores POC in America, Afropunk
- 2018 African Digital Art, Art by Penda Diakité
- 2017 Interview with artist Penda Diakité, Professional Artist Magazine
- 2017 Art by Penda Diakité, CAYLX A Journal of Art and Literature by Women
- 2017 Art by Penda Diakité, OOB Magazine
- 2017 Interview with artist Penda Diakité, BLKTICKETCONCEPT
- 2017 Interview with artist Penda Diakité, Akatasia ‘All Things African
- 2015 Interview with contemporary artist and filmmaker Penda Diakité, Akatasia ‘All Things African

=== Fashion ===
- 2017 Interview with artist Penda Diakité, The Network Journal
- 2016 ‘Rad Creative of the day: Penda Diakité,’ Afropunk
- 2016 PendaWear, Artistic Swimwear, Miss Zeee ‘All Things Bright & African’

=== Film ===
- 2013 Interview KBOO Radio The Film Show, interview on film ‘Tanti and the Neighbourhood Kids’
- 2013 Skanner Newspaper Interview, ‘Tanti and the Neighbourhood Kids’ filmmaker interview
- 2013 Cascade Festival of African Films interview for filmmakers archive
- 2005 Festival Honours Women, The Portland Skanner Newspaper for ‘Welcome to Mali,’ directed by Penda Diakité

=== Author ===
- 2006 I Lost My Tooth in Africa, by Penda Diakité, Scholastic Press
- 2006 PBS Reading Rainbow featured: I Lost My Tooth in Africa by Penda Diakite, Scholastic Press
- 2006 Newsweek magazine, Tip Sheet: Required Reading for I Lost My Tooth in Africa, by Penda Diakité, Nov Issue
- 2006 Black History Month Can Help Kids Dream, by Sarah Miller, St. Louis Post- Dispatch
- 2006 Artists in Residence, by Gabrielle Glaser, The Oregonian
- 2006 Miami Herald Review: I Lost My Tooth in Africa
- 2006 Review in Children’s Corner, by Mary Russell, Chicago Tribune
