= Desiree Venn Frederic =

Desirée Venn Frederic (born 1982, Sierra Leone) is a social alchemist, business owner, and artist based in Washington D.C.
