= Malian Americans =

Americans of Malian birth or descent

Malian-Americans
Total population
- 1,790 (2000 US Census); 6,000 (Malian-born, 2008-2012; American Community Survey Briefs)

Regions with significant populations
- Mainly New York City, Philadelphia, Washington, DC, Atlanta, Chicago, New Orleans and Baltimore

Languages
- Main American English; Bambara; French

Religion
- Islam

Related ethnic groups
- Ivorian American, Guinean American, Senegalese American, African Americans

Malian Americans (French: Américains maliens) are an ethnic group of Americans with ancestry originating in Mali. According to the US Census Bureau ancestry survey, approximately 1,800 Americans stated they had Malian ancestry, making them Malian Americans. The survey did not take into account undocumented immigrants or people who did not participate in the survey, which could mean that many more uncounted Malians live throughout the United States.

== History ==
The first people of Malian origin who were brought to the colonies were mainly enslaved Mandinkas, a Muslim ethnic group descended from the Mali Empire (1230s–1600s), who scattered throughout West Africa through the empire's expansion. They were transported from places such like Senegal to the United States as slaves during the 17th through 19th centuries. In Louisiana, the non-Muslim Bambara from Mali were a large group. Non-Muslim people from India were included as well. The enslaved Africans were often captured as a result of conflicts with other African ethnic groups. They were then enslaved by the winner of the conflict, and subsequently sold to European and American slave traders on the African shores.

After the abolition of slavery in the United States in 1865, few Malians immigrated to the United States until the 20th century. The first voluntary wave of Malian migration occurred in the 1970s and 1980s due to disasters.

It was not until the 1990s that the largest wave of Malian immigrants arrived in the United States. At that time, the majority of Malian immigrants to the U.S. and Europe were escaping poverty and famine, and political unrest, in their country. At the beginning of the decade, most Malians who immigrated to New York were Malian musicians and Dioula (traders). In New York, they sought new markets to sell their products. Over time, they moved to other cities including Chicago, Seattle and Philadelphia. As a result of these migrations, Chicago became one of the major cities in the United States with a Malian community. In addition, many Malians who immigrated during this decade were women who came to New York and Washington DC, in pursuit of economic and educational opportunities. In addition, a small group of graduate students, studying under government-sponsored scholarships, moved to the US, along with family members using the lottery system to obtain green cards. Roughly 3,500 Malians enter the United States each year on temporary visas, but only about 85 Malians actually become US citizens each year. Some Malian immigrants, mainly women seeking refuge from the widespread practice of female genital mutilation in West Africa, also seek to gain asylum.

== Demography ==
Many Malians live illegally in the United States, and raise native-born children. Furthermore, the practice of polygamy exists in Muslim countries and is still maintained in the Malian community in the United States.

The cities with the most significant populations are: New York City (an estimated 20,000 people of Malian origin, mostly in the Bronx where approximately 8,000 live), Washington, DC, Atlanta, Chicago, and Baltimore. Malian Americans may speak French as a first or second language, English, Bambara, or other African languages. Most are Muslims. The Malian community has continued to grow rapidly due to immigration to New York.

== Organizations and parties ==
Most Malians are Muslims. Many Malians meet regularly for parties and holidays; both Muslim and Christian holidays are included. They celebrate both traditional Malian holidays such as Malian Independence Day as well as those celebrated in the US, such as Thanksgiving and American Independence Day.

As with other ethnic groups, multiple Malian organizations exist. One, the Mali Association, is a mutual aid organization that helps members who encounter financial problems. Monthly meetings are held where various problems affecting the community are discussed. Established in 2001, it is supported by many Malians. The organization and the community make financial contributions to be used in emergencies such as illness or death.

Because of the cultural ties that bind many Malians with other ethnic groups in West Africa, many Malians regularly attend events and meetings of other West African organizations in Chicago and, although these groups are largely organized along national lines, there is much fluidity among the organizations. Consequently, there is talk of forming a larger West African organization in the city.

== Legacy ==
Historian Matt Schaffer believes that American Southern English, "despite all its varieties, is essentially an African-American slave accent, and possibly a Mandinka accent, with other African accents, along with the colonial British accent layered in."

== Notable people ==
- Mohamed Bamba
- Estelle Johnson
- Bakary Soumaré
- Cheick Modibo Diarra
- Penda Diakté

== See also ==
- Malians in France
- Mali–United States relations
