= Ivorian Americans =

Americans of Ivorian birth or descent

Total population
- 3,110 (2000 US Census); 100,000 (Ivorian-born; 2008–2012)

Regions with significant populations
- Mainly New York City, Boston, Philadelphia, Chicago, Milwaukee, Washington, D.C., Atlanta, Miami, Vineland, Danbury and Providence

Languages
- Main American English; French; Dioula dialect (Bambara); Nouchi; Gurma; Akan languages

Related ethnic groups
- French; African Americans; American groups of West Africa; Senegalese Americans; Guinean Americans; Malian Americans; Liberian Americans; Ghanaian Americans, etc.

Ivorian Americans are an ethnic group of Americans of Ivorian descent. According to estimates, in 2014 there were 6,000 people in the United States of Ivorian ancestry.

== History ==
Like other African groups, the first Ivorians to arrive in the United States were imported as slaves in the 18th century. In the 1970s a small group of Ivorian students came to the United States and then lived there permanently. A larger wave of migration of Ivorians happened in the 1990s. In the 1980s, Ivorians (and people of West Africa in general) saw the US as a place of great economic and educational opportunities. Thus, the Ivorians began to settle in cities such as Chicago, Atlanta and Boston to get better work than they could at home. Hairbraiding and driving taxis were prominent occupations for Ivorians. A strong system of chain migration began. That is, friends and family emigrated to the United States, coming to places like New York City. Also, the First Ivorian Civil War in 2002 prompted the emigration of thousands of Ivorians to North America.

== Demographics and languages ==
The cities with the most significant population are: Tampa, Dallas, New York City, Washington, DC, Baltimore, Worcester (Massachusetts), Bridgeport (Connecticut), Philadelphia, Chicago, Atlanta, Boston and the Rhode Island state, mainly in Providence.

Ivorian immigration into the U.S. has been increasing since the 1990s. Ivorians speak several African Languages, being the most spoken the Dioula dialect of Bambara, Dioula, Gurma, and Senufo, other languages native languages include: the Gur languages, the Senufo languages, the Kru languages (including the Bété languages, and the Kwa languages from which Baoulé and Anyin are used by a considerable part of Ivorians, French is the national language of Cote D'Ivoire.

== Organizations ==
In 1999, the Organisation des ressortissants de l'Ouest de la Côte d'Ivoire, a social and mutual aid organization, was founded. Chicago is a major city with a large Ivorian population. Most of them come from the west of Ivory Coast, culturally similar to Malians. However, there are also important groups from the north of Ivory Coast and small groups from the east and south of the country, which sometimes gather together to celebrate social events and for mutual assistance. Thus, these groups invite each other to parties, christenings and other events. Although also meet with other people from West Africa. Groups are also involved in political activity, locally representing the main political parties in Côte d'Ivoire, such as the Popular Front for the Ivory Coast or the Democratic Party of Côte d'Ivoire African Democratic Rally.

The Ivorians have tried to create organizations and events aimed at uniting the entire population of Ivorians in the U.S. So, in the late 1980s, the earliest Ivorian migrants created the Association of Ivorians in Chicago, celebrating festivals and sponsored parties, but ended up disbanding in the 1990s despite its success. Events currently exercised by the Ivorians are in holidays like Independence Day.

The Ivorians also start churches in the U.S. in which there are translators for English and French speakers. An example is La Generation Des Vainqueurs Ministry Church in Richardson, Texas with a predominantly Ivorian Congregation.

In 2000, they created a nonprofit organization called IvoirEspoir (Ivory Hope) which aims to raise funds and awareness of the force, the dangers and prevention of HIV and AIDS in Côte d'Ivoire. The organization provides medical training, health clinics, and information on the disease. The organization is expanding rapidly and seeks to raise global knowledge about the AIDS crisis in Africa.

== Notable people ==
- Mo Bamba
- Bambadjan Bamba
- Isaach De Bankole
- Roland Hayes
- Alex Poythress (born 1993), American-Ivorian basketball player for Maccabi Tel Aviv of the Israeli Premier Basketball League
- Maki Tall
- Amos Zereoué
- Tanoh Kpassagnon

== See also ==
- Ivory Coast–United States relations
