= Liberian Americans =

Americans of Liberian birth or descent

Total population
- 95,300

Regions with significant populations
- New York metropolitan area, Greater Boston, Philadelphia metropolitan area, Providence, RI, Pawtucket, RI, Columbus, OH, Lansing, MI, Chicago metropolitan area, Milwaukee metropolitan area, Baltimore–Washington, Charlotte metropolitan area, Metro Atlanta, Miami metropolitan area, Jacksonville, FL, Louisville metropolitan area, Memphis, TN, Minneapolis–Saint Paul, Fargo, Des Moines, Greater Houston, Dallas–Fort Worth metroplex, Denver metropolitan area, Seattle metropolitan area, Phoenix metropolitan area, Greater Los Angeles, San Francisco Bay Area, San Diego

Languages
- Mainly Liberian English; American English; Kpelle; Bassa; Kru; Krahn; Mandingo; but also Grebo, Gio, Mano, Loma, Vai, Gola, Kissi, Gbandi, and Mende.

Religion
- 85.6% of Liberians are Christians. Protestantism at 76.3% is predominant in the Greater Monrovia region and surrounding suburbs and Catholicism at 7.2% is predominant in the Southeastern counties. Islam is practiced by 12.2% of Liberians and is predominant among the Mandingo ethnic group as well as many members of the Vai and Mende ethnic groups. Traditional beliefs such as Voodoo or Juju is still practiced even among Christians and Muslims. The religious statistics for Liberian Americans however tend to be more Christian or irreligious.

Related ethnic groups
- African American; Americo-Liberian; Sierra Leonean Americans; Guinean Americans; Ivorian Americans

Liberian Americans are an ethnic group of Americans of full or partial Liberian ancestry. This can include Liberians who are descendants of Americo-Liberian people in America. The majority of Liberians came to the United States during the First Liberian Civil War in the 1990s and the Second Liberian Civil War in the early 2000s.

The diplomatic relationship between Liberia and the United States goes back over 200 years to Liberia's foundation as a settlement for free people of color and freedmen from the United States organized by the American Colonization Society in 1822.

== History ==
=== The first Liberians in the United States ===
The first people that emigrated to the United States from the regions that currently form Liberia were slaves imported between the 17th and 19th centuries. Thus, many individuals can trace backgrounds to groups such as the Kpelle, Kru, Gola, and, perhaps, the Gio, Grebo, Bassa, Vai and Mandingo. Many of them were imported by Virginia, South Carolina and Georgia planters. The children of some of these slaves gained some notability in the United States, as was the case of abolitionist, journalist, physician, and writer Martin Delany (1812 – 1885), arguably the first proponent of American black nationalism and the first African-American field officer in the United States Army during the American Civil War.

Between 1822 and the second half of the 19th century, many free people of color and slaves returned to Africa, settling in West Africa and founding Liberia (inhabiting regions already populated) under the aegis of the American Colonization Society. Only several hundred Liberians immigrated to the United States in the early 20th century, a very small number compared with the people who emigrated from Europe, Asia and Latin America. This continued in the 1950s and 1960s, as only 232 and 569 Liberians immigrated to the United States in each respective decade. It was not until the 1970s that there was a considerable outmigration from Liberia, which amounted to 2,081 people. This low immigration was due to the fact that Liberia was one of the more stable democracies and economies in Africa prior to the military coup in 1980.

=== First Liberian Civil War ===
During the 20th century few Liberian emigrated to United States; most who did were students. However, during the First Liberian Civil War (1989–96), thousands of Liberians emigrated to the United States. From 1990 through 1997, the INS reported that 13,458 Liberians fled to the United States and lived there permanently. During these years, there were also tens of thousands who sought temporary refuge in the United States. In 1991 alone, the INS guaranteed Temporary Protective Status (TPS) to approximately 9,000 Liberians in the United States. After the war, another 6,000 Liberians moved to Providence, Rhode Island. About 10,000 other Liberians settled across the U.S. and most of them decided to stay after the war ended. Although the INS revoked the TPS status in 1997 following national elections in Liberia, many of these Liberian Americans refused return to Liberia. In 1999, the U.S. Congress decided to give the Liberian refugees permanent status in the United States.

=== Second Liberian Civil War ===
After the Second Liberian Civil War (1999–2003), large numbers of Liberians settled in Rhode Island, Staten Island, Philadelphia, Virginia, Georgia and Minnesota. By 2010, Liberians established another sizable community in California, primarily in West Los Angeles and the Bay Area (San Francisco and Oakland).

== Demography ==
Liberian American organizations estimate there are between 250,000 and 500,000 Liberians living in the United States. This figure includes Liberian residents that have a temporary status, and American of Liberian descent.

As of 2017, an estimated 4,700 Liberian-Americans live in the Fargo, North Dakota area. Other cities with large Liberian populations include Brooklyn Park, MN, Minneapolis, MN, St. Paul, MN, Brooklyn Center, MN Providence, RI, Pawtucket, RI, Staten Island, NY, the Bronx, NY. Newark, NJ Trenton, NJ, Morrisville, PA, Southwest Philadelphia, Darby, PA, Upper Darby Township, Pennsylvania, Folcroft, PA, Sharon Hill, PA, Baltimore, MD, Silver Spring, MD, Gaithersburg, MD, Johnson City, TN, Charlotte, NC, Lawrenceville, GA, Jacksonville, FL, Des Moines, IA, Sioux Falls, SD, Columbus, OH, Fort Worth, TX, and Phoenix, AZ.

Many Liberians have formed families in United States. However, some still vow to return to their country once the political and social situation stabilizes, which, according to the president of the Union of Liberian Associations in the Americas, Joseph D. Z. Korto, seems unlikely to happen in a "near future."

According to Census estimates from the American Community Survey for 2017–2021, the total number of Liberian immigrants in the United States was 95,300.

== Language and culture ==
While there is a variety of languages spoken in Liberia (where English is the official language of the country), the majority of Liberians in the United States speak Standard English as well as the Liberian Kreyol language also known as Kolokwa which serves as a lingua franca among Liberians of different ethnic groups. The Kru languages such as Bassa, Kru, and Krahn are the most widely spoken Liberian native languages in the United States as well as Kpelle and Mandingo, both Mande languages.

The vast majority of Liberians, and thus Liberian Americans, are Christians (85.6%). Protestantism (76.3%) is predominant in the Greater Monrovia region and surrounding suburbs while Catholicism (7.2%) I mostly found in the southeastern counties. Islam is practiced by 12.2% of Liberians and is predominant among the Mandingo ethnic group as well as many members of the Vai and Mende ethnic groups. Traditional beliefs such as Voodoo or Juju have a stronghold in the more rural counties but is still practiced even among Christians and Muslims. The religious statistics for Liberian Americans however tend to be more Christian or irreligious.

== Politics ==
Liberian Americans are actively involved in lobbying the federal government, supporting freedom and democracy in Liberia. They also have organizations that support various issues affecting Liberia, such as humanitarian assistance, wildlife and nature preservation, and women's rights.

== Notable Liberian-Americans ==
- Nathan Biah (born 1971), member of the Rhode Island House of Representatives since 2021
- Michael Blackson, comedian
- Telfar Clemens (born 1985), fashion designer and designer of Liberia's 2020 Olympic team uniforms
- Wilmot Collins (born 1963), mayor of Helena, Montana since 2018; refugee of the First Liberian Civil War
- Alvin Kamara, NFL running back
- Destroy Lonely, rapper
- Wayétu Moore (born 1985), author and Africana studies lecturer
- Kwity Paye (born 1998), Indianapolis Colts player
- Joe Ragland (born 1989), American-Liberian basketball player for Hapoel Holon of the Israeli Basketball Premier League
- Naquetta Ricks, member of the Colorado House of Representatives since 2021
- Timothy Weah, professional soccer player
- Ralph Yarl, American student wounded in a shooting on April 13, 2023
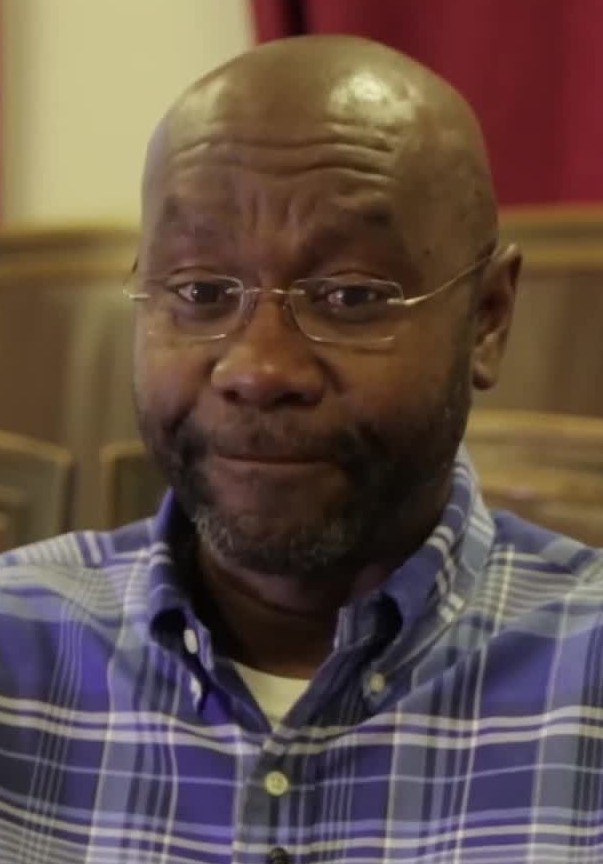
Wilmot Collins is a Liberian refugee who has served as mayor of Helena, Montana since 2018

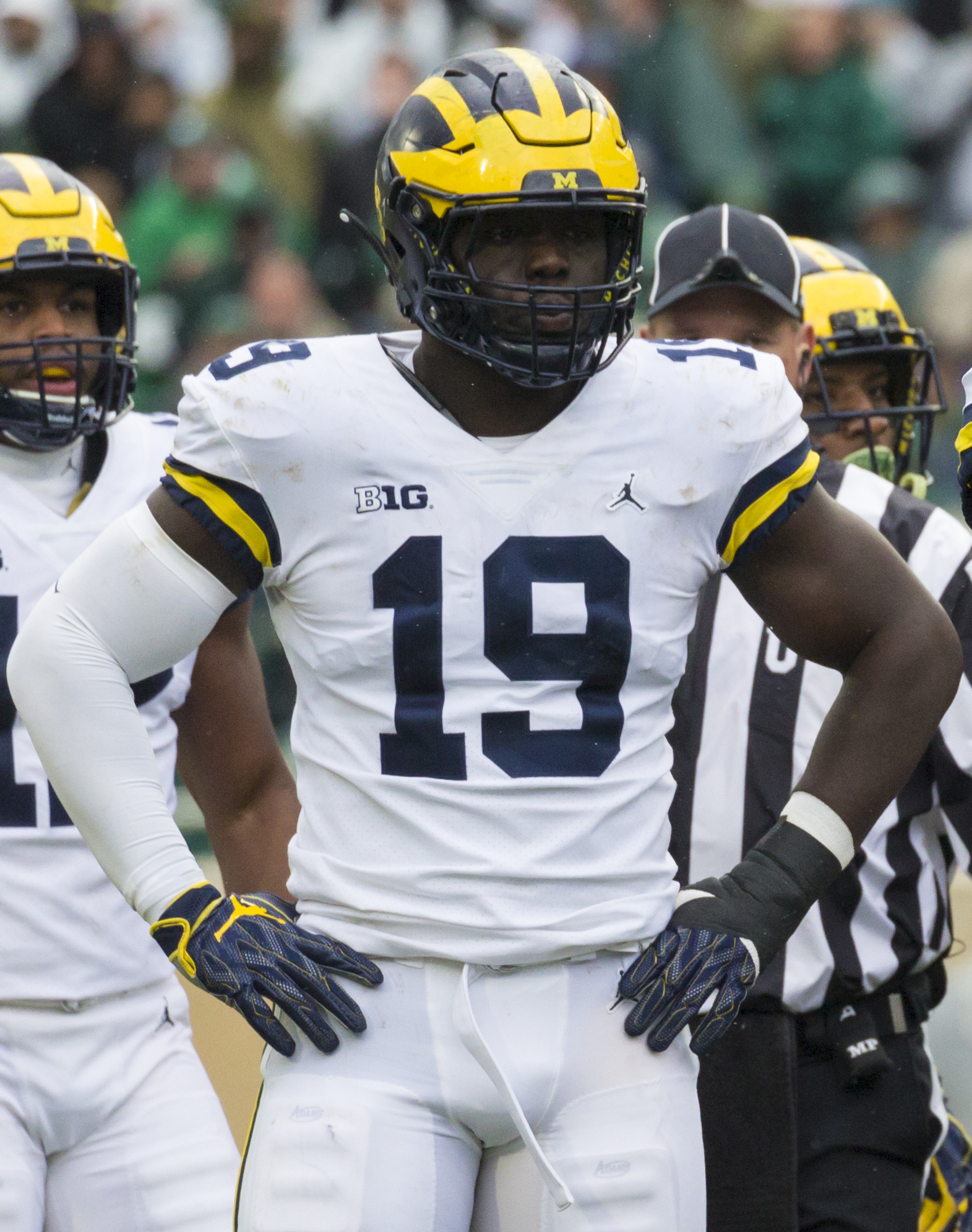
Kwity Paye is an Indianapolis Colts player born to a Liberian Krahn mother

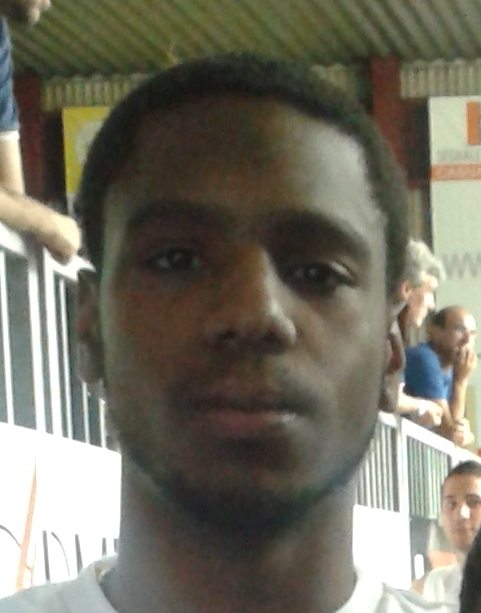
Joe Ragland is an American-Liberian basketball player for Hapoel Holon of the Israeli Basketball Premier League

== See also ==
- Little Liberia, Staten Island
- American Colonization Society
- Liberia–United States relations
