= Guinean Americans =

Americans of Guinean birth or descent

Total population
- 3,016 (ancestry or ethnic origin, 2000 US Census); 11,000 (Guinean born, 2008–2009 US Census)

Regions with significant populations
- Mainly Washington, D.C., New York City, Boston, Philadelphia, Georgia, Florida, Louisiana, Oklahoma, Texas, Ohio, Michigan, Illinois, Wisconsin, New Jersey, Connecticut and Rhode Island

Languages
- Main American English; French; Maninka (Malinke); Susu; Pular (Fulfulde or Fulani); Kissi; Kpelle

Religion
- Islam, Christianity, Traditional religions

Related ethnic groups
- African American, American groups of West Africa (Ivorian, Malian, Senegalese, Sierra Leonean, Liberian, etc.), French

Guinean Americans are an ethnic group of Americans of Guinean descent. According to estimates by 2000 US Census, there were 3,016 people who identified Guinean as one of their two top ancestry identities. (Note: People who filled out the long form could identify two ancestries. They could also identify only one, so if someone had four grandparents who had come from four countries they could not identify all four countries.) However, in November 2010 the New York Times estimated that as many 10,000 Guineans and Guinean Americans reside in New York City alone.

== History ==
The first Guineans who emigrated to the United States were bought as slaves in colonial times. Many of them came from peoples such as Baga and the Susu and hailed from places such as Fouta Djallon. So, many slaves of day-present Guinea were Muslims (case of the Fulbes and the Susu people). Many Guineans were bought in places as the Boké village and the Pongo River, since where were exported to places such as New York, The Carolinas or Louisiana. So, since Boké were sent many slaves to the plantations of The Carolinas to work in the rice fields of this territory. The Pongo River highlighted as slavery area in the 1800s after the trade was legally abolished.

In addition, in 1712 a boat arrived with slaves from the Guinean Coast to French Louisiana, and did so every year thereafter, when the Frenchman Antoine Crozat, who was the first owner of the private property of French Louisiana, obtained the monopoly of trade in Louisiana by the French government and was allowed to use slave labor with the permission of the Company of Guinea. So, in the early stages of the slave trade to Louisiana, most of the slaves were almost entirely from Senegal and Guinea, probably because those slaves could favor the rice plantations of this state already that they were familiar with rice plantations which was commonly grown in Senegambia and Guinea.

One of the earliest notable Muslims in the USA was Bilali "Ben Ali" Muhammad, a Fula man from Timbo's Guinean region, who emigrated at Sapelo Island, Georgia, during 1803. While enslaved, Ben Ali wrote the Bilali Document and served as the religious leader and Imam for eighty slavered Muslim men that lived on his plantation.

After slavery abolition (1865) and until 1990, few Guineans emigrated to the United States and, these were mostly scholars and professionals. On the late 1980s, Guineans began to immigrate to the U.S. as a way to escape poverty and the harsh military regime in their country - Guinea. So, they settled initially in New York City, Boston and Atlanta, forming important communities. Over time, Guineans were migrating to other parts of the U.S., such as Chicago (whose Guineans came also from New York). Like other African immigrant groups, Guineans work in a diverse professional sectors, particularly in the taxi industry and hairbraiding sector.

== Demography ==
The Guinean American communities with the most significant population are Washington, DC, New York City, Texas, Georgia, Indiana, Ohio, Rhode Island and Illinois. Guinean immigration into the U.S. has been increasing since the 1990s. Guinean Americans speak several African languages, being the most spoken the Pular (Fulfulde, Fulani, Fula or Peul), Maninka (Malinke), Susu, Kissi and Kpelle languages. They also speak French and English (as second language).

== Organizations ==
The Guinean community participates in Muslim and Christian festivals and "informal social events throughout the year". The Guineans have diverses associations in the USA, which are located in states such as New York, Illinois, Texas and Georgia, among others. These associations finance health care of the Guineans, among other things.

== Notable people ==
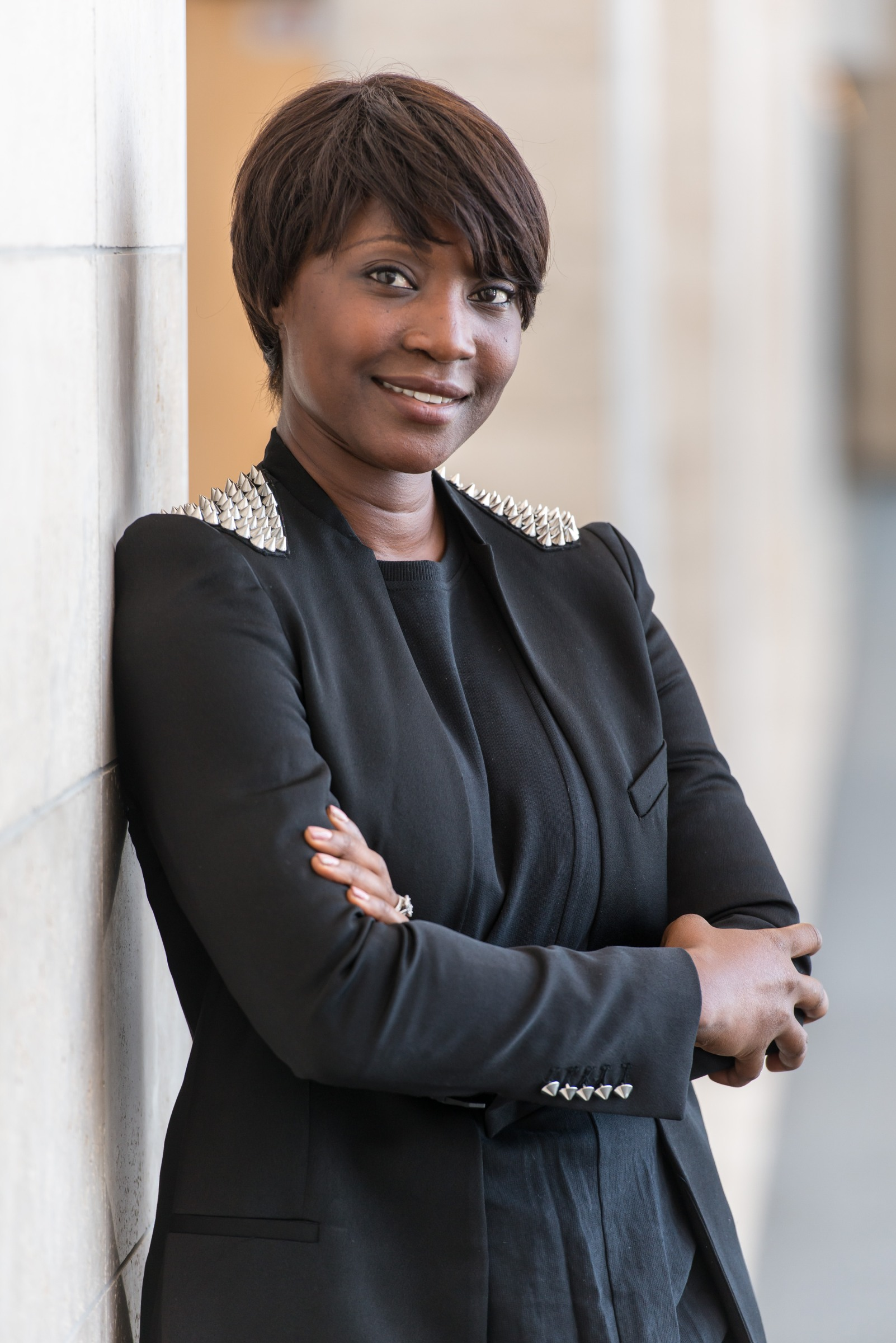
Ms. Tiguidanke Camara, Chairman & CEO Tigui Mining Group (TMG)

- Tigui Camara – former model and mining entrepreneur
- Bolokada Conde – master drummer
- Queen Aminata – professional wrestler
- Hamidou Diallo – NBA basketball player
- Bilali "Ben Ali" Muhammad – enslaved Muslim writer
- Jonathan Majors - actor
- Yarrow Mamout – formerly enslaved businessman
- Abdul Rahman Ibrahima Sori – enslaved prince and military commander
- Killing of Amadou Diallo

== See also ==
- Guinea–United States relations
