= Senegalese Americans =

Americans of Senegalese birth or descent

Total population
- 18,092 (2019 American Community Survey)

Regions with significant populations
- New York City (Harlem, Brooklyn, Bronx), Boston, Philadelphia, New Jersey, Chicago, Milwaukee, Washington, D.C., Atlanta, Miami, Minneapolis, New Orleans, Tulsa, Dallas, Houston, Denver, Seattle, Oakland, Anaheim

Languages
- American English; Wolof; French

Religion
- Muslims, Christians and Practitioners of traditional religion of Senegal.

Related ethnic groups
- African Americans, American groups of West Africa (Gambian, Ivorian, Malian, Guinean, Mauritanian, Bissau-Guinean, etc.), French

Senegalese Americans (French: Américains sénégalais) are an ethnic group of Americans of Senegalese descent. In the surveys of 2019, 18,091 people claimed to be of Senegalese origin or descent in the United States. However, many West Africans trafficked by enslavers to the United States were also of Senegalese origin (arriving together with Africans of other origins who came by way of Senegalese ports). Thus many African Americans may also have some ancestors of this country.

== History ==
=== Slavery ===
The first people whom Europeans trafficked and enslaved from present-day Senegal arrived in the modern United States from several ports of Senegal. The Senegambia area (moderns Senegal, Gambia and Guinea-Bissau) was a critical human-trafficking hub during the seventeenth, eighteenth and nineteenth centuries, both for the United States and Latin America, exporting many West and Central Africans to the Americas. Europeans trafficked most of the West Africans they would soon enslave in the USA through the Saint-Louis port, as well as from Goree Island (while, also are registered some West and Central Africans from Galam port in South Carolina). So, Goree Island, located a few miles off the coast of Senegal in the Atlantic Ocean, was the place from which the Europeans and Americans trafficked West and Central Africans to the former British colonies of North America, during the seventeenth and eighteenth centuries, and even after of the official abolition of slavery in the nineteenth century, displacing maybe 50,000 West and Central Africans from there (although according to the Slave House curator, 20 million West and Central Africans were exported from the Gorée island to the modern United States).

However, not all enslaved people collected from present-day Senegal were actually from there: many of them hailed from other African regions, having been trafficked through Senegal ports by the kings and aristocracies of other parts of Africa, as a consequence of war. Through these ports, Europeans trafficked them to the Americas. While, most West and Central Africans sold into slavery in the Senegal region would have departed from the mouths of the Senegal River to the north, and from the Gambia River to the south, coming from several places, among which highlighted Futa Tooro (Note: Futa Tooro was, in indeed, one of the main proslavery Kingdoms of West Africa during the colonial period of the Americas.) and Bundu.

Regarding specifically the people from present-day Senegal, most of them belonged to the Mandinga and Wolof ethnic groups, but also to a lesser extent, belonged to Djolas, Fula, Serer and Bambara peoples, at least.

During their stay in the modern United States, West Africans from Senegambia staged some prominent revolts. Thus, in 1765, while the brigantine Hope was bringing West Africans from the coast of Senegal and Gambia to Connecticut, the West Africans provoked a revolt aboard of the brigantine, leveraging the murder of the captain (who had murdered several of his crewmen) for some crewmen. In the revolt, the West Africans killed one crew member and wounded several others. On this day the revolt was suppressed through the murder of seven of them.

Most of the Senegalese whom Europeans trafficked to South Carolina, Georgia and the Gulf Coast (highlighting his number in Louisiana), followed mainly by Virginia and Maryland. These places imprisoned thousands of people from day-present Senegal in the American gulag, being a significant minority in the West and Central African population of there (although people from Gambia were more numerous) and the predominant West and Central African groups in Louisiana (with people from Guinea, in the early stages of the Maafa in this place, between 1712 and 1719) (Note: Many Senegambians of Louisiana were Wolof and Bambara people in the eighteenth century.) and North Carolina. Europeans trafficked Senegalese and Guineans to those places probably because those people had the agricultural expertise to make rice plantations flourish, due to the prevalence of rice cultivation in Senegambia and Guinea. (Note: Outside the five largest population centers of Senegalese trafficked by Europeans to the United States, Senegalese constituted less than 5% of African population in places such as New York or Pennsylvania (numbered in the hundreds of Senegambians). Although the Senegalese were the largest cohort of Africans in North Carolina, Europeans enslaved only 544 West and Central Africans there..)

=== Recent immigration ===
In the twentieth century voluntary Senegalese emigration to the United States rose again. Most immigrants settled in Manhattan, New York City. Many of them soon resettled, emigrating to Chicago and other areas. During the 1970s, many groups of students, employees and Senegalese street vendors arrived in the United States. These immigrants, in places as the aforementioned Chicago, often were traders. However many of Senegalese living in United States also have high professions, such as engineering and accounting.

According the Encyclopedia of Chicago, the number of Senegalese immigrants who arrived to the United States had a higher growth after "the implementation of the structural adjustment programs of the 1980s and the devaluation of the CFA currency in Senegal in 1990". However, the changing of migration occurred not only by the increase in numbers of Senegaleses arriving: Until the late 1990s, the majority of Senegalese who emigrated to the United States were young men, but since the end of the decade, women also began to immigrate, working as hairdressers, waitresses in restaurants and studying in universities.

== Demography ==
The Senegalese population in the United States is diverse, both linguistically and culturally, although the majority of Senegalese are Muslims. There are also Senegalese Christians and animists who still practice their African beliefs. The Senegalese tend to speak a variety of languages. They speak languages that are native to Senegal, especially the Wolof, but also French (the national language of Senegal) and English. Senegalese traders in Chicago have specialized in African art.

=== Senegalese in New York ===
In the United States, one of the largest concentrations of people of Senegalese origin is in the state of New York, where they form one of the four main Muslim groups from Africa, being the neighborhood Little Senegal, or Le Petit Senegal, one of its major enclaves, a neighborhood which varies linguistically. They form the majority group in a particular area of Harlem (116th Street between St. Nicholas Avenue and Frederick Douglass Boulevard). However, the majority of Senegalese living in this neighborhood grew up poor in small villages in Senegal, where they did not receive an education, so they do not usually go to schools in Harlem. The most educated Senegalese usually do not live in New York, preferring places like New Jersey. Due to the size of the Senegalese community in Little Senegal, there are also some Wolof interpreters who work as volunteers at the Harlem Hospital. The Wolof language extends throughout the neighborhood, including in the Senegalese restaurants, which use both English and Wolof. Most Senegalese are owners of shops, jewelry stores, taxis, travel agencies and professional companies. Senegalese people have successfully assimilated into the American culture while still maintaining their native language, Wolof. Preserving this language helps to unify and strengthen 'Little Senegal'.

According the Association of Senegalese in America, there are an estimated 18,000 Senegalese living in New York as of 2008.

== Media and Senegalese publications ==
Senegal conducted a relations program with the US Senegalese community, so many publications written in this country such as newspapers, magazines and brochures or restaurant menus from Senegal, are sent into the community via email. Most information comes through newsletters, but not there many bulletins of this type. The newsletters report about the events that occur in Senegal. However, there are also three Senegalese programs that are broadcast by radio stations; one is Voices of America. The programs are heard within an hour every Sunday and the radio announcers often speak Wolof. The newsletters are written mostly in French, although there is one written in Wolof. Many others people also are learning Wolof at Columbia University. There are organizations that support the recognition of Senegalese nationality or activism in the United States, as does the Association of Senegalese in America. ASA used to have an FM radio station, a broadcast that discusses the way in which the Senegalese of the US should cooperate in this community, and the kind of life that they have in the US.

== Organizations ==
A Muslim association created by Senegalese immigrants is Tuba Da'ira Chicago, in Rogers Park (Chicago). People who belong to this organization are the disciples of the Murid tariqa (Arabic: Muslim Sufi order). Most of the current members of Da'ira are people who have just arrived from New York to Chicago looking for better markets and better educational opportunities. The Da'ira has held numerous activities in Chicago. The murids usually meet every week to sing the litany of the wali (Arabic: the friend of God or holy leader) Cheikh Amadou Bamba Mbacké. The Da'ira holds an annual conference with the African American and Arab Muslim communities in Chicago. In 1997, the City of Chicago stated that on August 13, the Cheikh Amadou Bamba Day, The Da'ira allows the visit of a Murid marabout, a spiritual leader of Senegal, and a number of Islam. There also is a Senegalese association on Staten island newyorkolars. The Murid tariqa also develop an exchange program with American Islamic College in Chicago.

Launched in 2019, Tékkil is a nonprofit organization dedicated to connecting and advancing Senegalese-American professionals to be leaders in their careers and communities. The mission of Tékkil is to contribute to the success of Senegalese-American professionals through education, training, and community engagement in an effort to foster growth amongst the Senegalese-American community.

== Notable people ==
- Akon
- Ousmane Oumar Kane
- Ira Aldridge
- Ayuba Suleiman Diallo
- Anna Diop
- George Lewis
- Georges Niang
- Brock Peters
- Issa Rae
- Johnny Sekka
- Gabourey Sidibe
- Sheck Wes

== See also ==
- Senegal–United States relations
- French Senegal
- Senegalese people in France
- The Gateway to Africa
- Diol—Beye family murders, a Colorado family of 5 of Senegalese descent murdered by arson
