= Togolese Americans =

Americans of Togolese birth or descent

Total population
- 1,716 (2000 US census); 37,507 (Togolese-born. 2024 American Community Survey Briefs)

Regions with significant populations
- Montgomery County, Maryland, Bronx County, New York, Hennepin County, Minnesota, Marion County, Indiana and Douglas County, Nebraska

Languages
- American English; French; Togolese languages

Related ethnic groups
- African Americans

Togolese Americans (French: Américains togolais) are Americans of Togolese descent. According to answers provided to an open-ended question included in the 2000 census, 1,716 people said that their ancestry or ethnic origin was Togolese. An unofficial estimate in 2008 of the Togolese American population was more than 2,500.

== History ==
The first people from present-day Togo arrived in the United States enslaved. Most of these slaves shipped to the United States were disembarked at the Gulf Coast. The Gulf Coast includes the states of Louisiana, Mississippi, and Alabama. Most of the slaves belonged to the Ewe people which inhabit the south-eastern part of Ghana, Togo, Benin, and south-western Nigeria. This lasted until 1859, when Togolese-descended Cudjo Lewis arrived to Mobile from Dahomey. After the abolition of slavery, few Togolese came to the United States.

== Demography ==
Most Togolese who live in the United States are in the country legally and have received diversity immigrant visas, which require them to show that they were not likely to become public charges before receiving the visas. Many Togolese emigrated to the U.S. to further their education.

There is a Togolese community in Midwestern municipalities such as the Chicagoland metropolitan and the greater Twin-Cities metropolitan

== Notable people ==
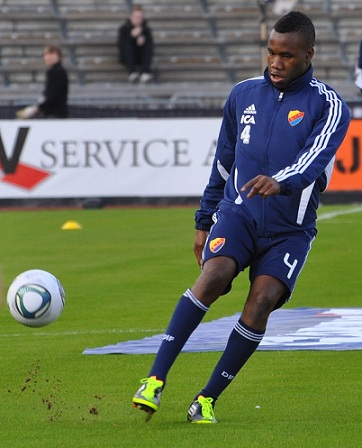
Gale Agbossoumonde

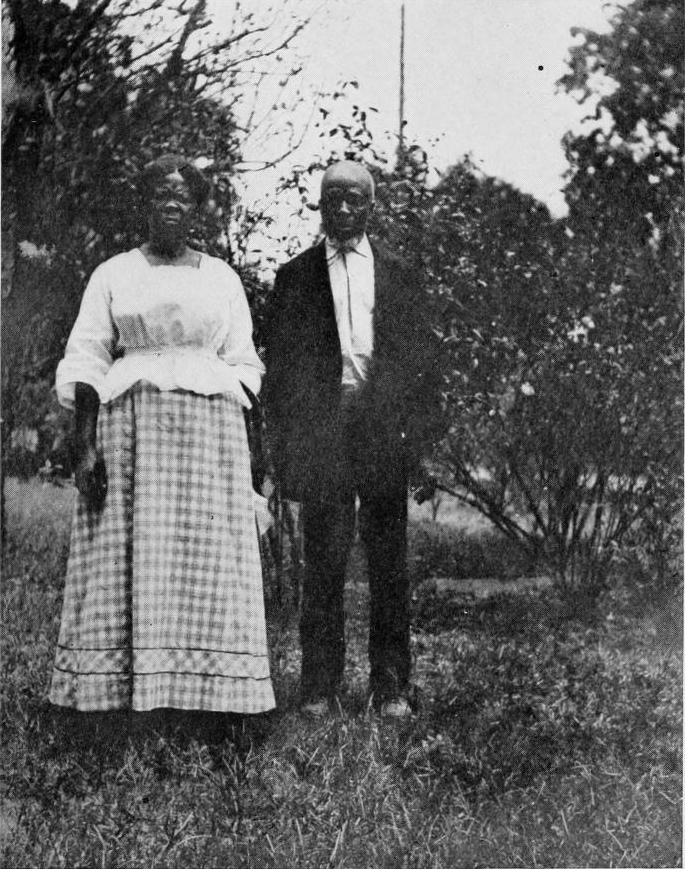
Cudjoe Lewis with his wife

- Gale Agbossoumonde, soccer player
- Tabi Bonney, rapper
- Bruce Djite, soccer player
- Jonte' Moaning, dancer
- Marie Thérèse Metoyer, businesswoman

== See also ==
- Togo–United States relations
