= Berber Americans =

Berber American
Total population
- 3,000

Languages
- American English · Berber · Arabic · French

Religion
- Sunni Islam

Related ethnic groups
- North Africans in the United States

Berber Americans, American Berbers, or Amazigh Americans are Americans of Berber (or Amazigh) descent. 1,327 people declared Berber ancestry in the 2000 US census. Berber Americans are part of the wider North African and Middle Eastern diaspora in the United States. In the USA, the Berber people have created several associations with the goal of maintaining and strengthening their language and culture, such as the Amazigh Cultural Association in America (ACAA), the United Amazigh Algerian (UAAA), the Amazigh American Association of Washington, D.C., and the Boston Amazigh Community. In New York City, the community has grown steadily over the decades, with a larger proportion of North Africans living in the New York City metropolitan area than in most areas in the United States.

== History and migration patterns ==
Berber Americans, primarily from Morocco, Algeria, Tunisia, are part of the broader North African and Middle Eastern migration population in the United States. Some of the North Africans first arrived in the United States as enslaved individuals in the 16th century, though little is documented about their numbers and communities.

The Amazigh people (Berbers) from northern Morocco were documented to have appeared in New York City in the early 1900s, primarily as performers part of the entertainment troupes organized by Moroccan-American Hassen Ben Ali. Between 1911 and 1913, Riffians (a Berber ethnic group) performed in productions such as The Garden of Allah and Fire and Sword, appearing at venues like Broadway theaters. They stayed temporarily in the city before returning to Morocco. Contemporary reports and ship manifests show that the performers retained elements of the Amazigh culture during their time in New York City.

In the 19th and early 20th centuries, larger waves of North African immigration began, with many North Africans seeking economic and professional opportunities, as well as religious escape. Immigration increased after World War II and especially following the Immigration and Nationality Act of 1965, which removed national origin quotas and allowed more North African immigrants to enter the United States. In the 1990s, families from Algeria, including Amazigh (Berbers), began settling in New York City, particularly in the neighborhood of Astoria, Queens.

In the period between 2018 and 2022, New York city hosted a significant share of the North Africans (many of Berber descent) and Middle Eastern immigrants with about 12 percent living in the metropolitan area.

== Organizations and initiatives ==
North African immigrants in New York City established small businesses, cultural spaces and religious institutions that mirrored their heritage. Prominent among these is the Al-Iman mosque in Astoria, which serves as one of the largest local congregational spaces where hundreds of North African and Middle Eastern Amazigh worshippers gather for prayer and communal worship.

Amazigh community members often faced pressures of cultural assimilation, with younger generations having difficulties with maintaining the Tamazight language and other cultural traditions while integrating into the American society.

The New York Forum of Amazigh Film (NYFAF) is one the main cultural initiatives representing the Amazigh community in New York City, founded in 2015 by Habiba Boumlik and Lucy R McNair. Established as an artistic and educational project, the festival presents featured films, documentaries by or about the Amazigh in North Africa and in the diaspora to promote understanding of the Amazigh culture, language and history in the United States. The festival emphasizes cross-cultural dialogue through screenings, exhibitions, musical performances and serves as a hub of community discovery where students, filmmakers, and local audience members exchange on themes like migration, Amazigh cultural resilience and indigeneity.

Another notable initiative within New York's Amazigh community is the presence of Kabyle dance and Folkloric performances group, documented as active in Brooklyn and surrounding neighborhoods. The group is a women's troupe that performs regularly in cultural celebrations such as Yennayer (the Amazigh new year). These groups preserve and share traditional Kabyle music and dance and offer community members a way to maintain cultural practices within the diaspora.

== Notable people ==
- Zehlia Babaci-Wilhite, Algerian-descent researcher and linguistics scholar, University of California, Berkeley
- Elias Zerhouni, Algerian-born radiologist and medical researcher
- Helene Hagan, American anthropologist and Amazigh activist
- Mohamed Mrabet, Moroccan-born author artist and storyteller of the Ait Ouriaghel tribe in the Rif region
- Zaida Ben-Yusuf, English-born Algerian American portrait photographer
- Malika Zarra, Moroccan-born, American/Moroccan singer, composer, and music producer now based in New York City
- Othmane Benafan, NASA scientist and co-inventor

== See also ==
- North Africans in the United States
- Arab Americans
- Algerian Americans
- Moroccan Americans
- Tunisian Americans
- Libyan Americans
- Egyptian Americans
- Canarian Americans
