= North Africans in the United States =

North African Americans
Total population
- 900,895 (2010 US census); 1,303,910 (North African-born, 2014)

Regions with significant populations
- New Jersey · New York · California · Washington, D.C. · Texas • Michigan

Languages
- Arabic · Berber · American English · French · Spanish

Religion
- Sunni Islam · Oriental Orthodoxy · Catholicism · Sephardic Judaism

Related ethnic groups
- Arab Americans, Berber Americans, Coptic Americans, Maghrebi Arabs, Maghrebi Jews, Moroccans, Algerians, Tunisians, Andalusians, Canarians, Libyans, Egyptians

North African Americans are Americans with origins in the region of North Africa. This group includes Americans of Algerian, Egyptian, Libyan, Moroccan, and Tunisian descent. Wider definitions also sometimes include those who trace their ancestry to Mauritania and Sudan.

Canarians are often also included as North Africans, because of the geographical location of the Canary Islands in North Africa, and the partly Maghrebi ancestry of the population (Canarians are generally of Iberian ancestry with some Berber extract). Canarians are politically and linguistically considered to be European-Hispanophones.

People from North Africa have been in the United States since the 16th century. Some of the early explorers who accompanied the Spanish on their expeditions in the Americas were North Africans, a group that also contributed to the settlement of some Spanish colonies in the United States. In 2008, the North African population in the U.S. exceeded 800,000 people.

In 2024, the Office of Management and Budget announced that the racial-ethnic categories used by the U.S. federal government would be updated; Americans of West Asian and North African origins will no longer be classified as White Americans in the upcoming 2030 United States census.

== History ==
The first centuries of North African presence in the United States are related to the Spanish colonial period in the southern regions of the present-day United States. Moroccan presence in the United States, for example, was rare until the mid-twentieth century. The first North African who came to the current United States was perhaps the Azemmouri or Estevanico, a Muslim Moroccan boat pilot of Berber origin, who participated in the Pánfilo de Narváez's ill-fated expedition to colonize Florida and the Gulf Coast in 1527. Only Azemmouri and three of his comrades survived during the eleven-year journey of 5,000 miles from present-day Florida, ending the tour in what is now Texas. In 1534, they crossed the geographic south of the United States until present-day Arizona, being also, later, one of four men who accompanied Marcos de Niza as a guide in search of the fabled Seven Cities of Cibola, preceding Coronado. He was also the first explorer who entered an Indigenous-American village.

Later, in 1566, forty years before Jamestown, the Spanish founded the colony of Santa Elena. The colony grew throughout the course of two decades, until it was invaded by the British in 1587. Many of the Santa Elena colonists were Moriscos and Jews. Ethnically, many of the Santa Elena colonists were Muslims (of Maghrebi and Iberian origin) and Maghrebi Jews, recruited by the Portuguese Captain Joao Pardo in the thick Galician mountains of northern Portugal in 1567 (i.e., less than one year before the climax of the Inquisition against Muslims). When Santa Elena fell, its inhabitants, including the converted Jews and Muslims, escaped into the mountains of North Carolina. They survived, often marrying Native Americans, and then joining a second group who arrived to American shores in 1587, the same year that Santa Elena fell.

Until the second half of the 20th century, the majority of North Africans who emigrated to the United States came from the Canary Islands (which belong to Spain). They came to some of the Spanish colonies in the present-day southern United States with the objectives to establish and repopulate regions for Spain. In 1539, Hernando de Soto recruited some expeditionaries in this archipelago to explore La Florida, and, in 1569, embarked another group of Canarian farmers (known in the Americas as Isleños) for this destination.

During the 18th century, other groups of Canarians arrived in what is now the southern United States, establishing themselves in several Spanish colonies. In 1731, 16 Canarian families arrived in San Antonio. Between 1757 and 1780, 984 additional Canarian families arrived in Florida. Although these groups promoted the agriculture of Florida, most of these settlers later emigrated to Cuba when Florida was sold to the British in 1763 (well as after being recovered by Spain). In 1819, the Florida territory was ceded to the United States. Between 1778 and 1783, approximately 2,000 Canarians emigrated to Louisiana. During the 18th century, more than 3,000 Canarians (who were subjects of Spain) emigrated to Spanish colonies in North America.

A small community of Moroccan expatriates existed in post-independence South Carolina (then referred to as "Moors", cf. the Moors Sundry Act of 1790).

Since the 1960s, continental North Africans have emigrated to the United States in significant numbers. Before then, very few continental North Africans arrived in the United States, numbering fewer than 100 people in the first half of the 19th century. During the first half of the 20th century, many North African emigrants in the United States were Moroccan Jews, and fellow Sephardic Jews from the northwestern Maghreb and Egypt. During the 1970s, many more Moroccans, Algerians, and Tunisians began to arrive in the United States. Sudanese did not start arriving in significant numbers until the 1980s, mostly to escape the civil war in their country.

The majority of North Africans in the United States have emigrated for economic, educational, political, and religious reasons.

== Demography ==
North Africans in the United States include Moroccan, Algerian, Tunisian, Libyan and Egyptian immigrants to the United States. The largest such communities live in New Jersey, New York, California, Washington, D.C., and Texas. In California, most North Africans live in around from Los Angeles, San Francisco and San Diego. In Texas, the communities are mainly in Dallas, Austin and Houston. There are also concentrated North African settlements in Michigan (especially in Detroit), Nebraska (Omaha), Florida (in cities such as Miami, Orlando or Jacksonville), Illinois (Chicago) and Virginia (in cities such as Alexandria). There are Isleño communities in Texas, Louisiana and in Florida. While in Texas and Louisiana, most of the Isleños are descended from Canarian settlers; in Florida are recent immigrants and their descendants.

The ancestries of North Africans in the United States are the following:

- Egyptian Americans: 256,070 (2016 American Community Survey)
- Moroccan Americans: 29,461 (2016 American Community Survey)
- Canarian Americans: 45,000 - 75,000 (2000 statistics)
- Libyan Americans: 9,000 (2010 Census)
- Algerian Americans: 8,752 (2000 Census)
- Tunisian Americans: 4,735 (2000 Census)
- Mauritanian Americans: 993 (2000 Census)

== Genetics ==
Most of these populations belong to the E1b1b paternal haplogroup, with Berber speakers having among the highest frequencies of this lineage. Additionally, genomic analysis has found that Berber and other Maghreb communities are defined by a shared ancestral component. This Maghrebi element peaks among Tunisian Berbers. It is related to the Coptic component, having diverged from these and other West Eurasian-affiliated components prior to the Holocene people with origins from Morocco, Algeria, Tunisia and Libya.

== Culture and language ==
Most of North Africans in the United States are Muslims (Majority Sunni, Minority Shia), Jews and Christians (Catholic, Protestant, Eastern Orthodox, Oriental Orthodox). Although there is also a small minority of people with the Berber culture that according to the census of 2000, they were 1327 people in the US. As well as also Jewish minorities originating mainly from Morocco. Most Muslims from North Africa are Sunnis.

Linguistically, the majority of North Africans in United States speak English, Arabic, Coptic (Egyptians), French (Algerians, Moroccans, and Tunisians), Berber languages, and Spanish (Canarian Spanish, Moroccans).

While the Arabic language is shared by most North African people – although in their particular dialects such as Moroccan Arabic or Tunisian Arabic, berber also is spoken mainly by many Moroccans (in fact, in Morocco, the people who speak Berber is, according various estimates, between 45% and 60% of the population) and Algerians (in Algeria represent between the 25% and the 45% of population) in United States. The majority of the Isleños speak English, but there still some people who speak a Canarian Spanish of the 18th century. The more recent Canarian immigrants; as they are Spanish, they speak Spanish.

== Organizations ==
Although some organizations created by North Africans in the United States are directed to the Muslim community general, there also associations directed specifically to the North African community of United States. This is the case of the Maghreb Association of North America (MANA), an organization created by Moroccan and Algerian Americans in Chicago with the goal of helping new immigrants from North Africa adapt to American life while maintaining the basic principles that consists of Islam, particularly of the Sunni branch. This organization is specifically directed to North African immigrants because they have not been associated closely with the Muslim people of Middle East.

The Amazigh Cultural Association in America (ACAA) is a non-profit organization established in the New Jersey state. This organization's goal is to promote the Amazigh (Berber) language and culture in the United States. The United Amazigh Algerian (UAAA), a nonreligious association based in the San Francisco bay area, also have a like goal of boosting the Berber culture in North America and beyond. Other Amazigh organizations are the Amazigh American Association of Washington, D.C. and the Boston Amazigh Community.

Many organizations are directed to specific ancestral groups like the Friends of Morocco and the Algerian American Association of Northern California.

== See also ==
- African Americans
- African immigration to the United States
- Amazigh Cultural Association in America
- Arab Americans
- Berber Americans
- Coptic Americans
- Little Maghreb
- Maghreb Association of North America
- Maghrebi Arabs
- North Africa
- North Africa American Cemetery and Memorial
