= Arab Americans =

Ethnic group

- Americans with Arab ancestry by state according to the US Census Bureau's American Community Survey in 2019

Total population
- 2,928,448; 2020 United States Census; 0.883% of the U.S. population

Regions with significant populations
- California; New York; Michigan; New Jersey; Florida; Texas; Massachusetts; Illinois; Pennsylvania; Virginia; Ohio; Tennessee

Languages
- Arabic · American English · French · Spanish · other languages in Arab countries

Religion
- Roman Catholic Church/Eastern Catholic – 35%, Orthodox – 18%, Protestant – 10%; Muslim: (Sunni, Shia, Druze) – 24%; Other religion/No affiliation – 13% (Zogby International Survey, 2002)

Arab Americans (Arabic: عَرَبٌ أَمْرِيكِا, romanized: ʻArab Amrīkā or Arabic: العرب الأمريكيون, romanized: al-ʻArab al-Amrīkīyūn) are Americans who trace ancestry to any of the various waves of immigrants from Arabic-speaking countries. In the United States census, Arabs are racially classified as White Americans which is defined as "A person having origins in any of the original peoples of Europe, the Middle East, or North Africa".

The 2020 U.S. census for the first time categorized Arab Americans as part of the Middle East and North Africa (MENA) group, which included both Arabic-speaking groups such as Lebanese and Egyptians and non-Arabic speaking such as Iranians and Israelis. As of 2020, 3.522 million people identified as MENA alone or in any combination with another group; within this population, over 2.5 million people reported MENA descent alone. Lebanese Americans were the largest community who were MENA alone or in any combination with another group, at 685,672 people; this was followed by Egyptian Americans with 396,854, Syrian Americans with 222,196 and Iraqi Americans with 212,875. Additionally, 238,921 defined themselves as simply "Arabs".

According to the 2010 United States census, there were 1,698,570 Arab Americans in the United States; 290,893 persons defined themselves as simply Arab, and a further 224,241 as Other Arab. Other groups on the 2010 census are listed by nation of origin, and some may or may not be Arabs, or regard themselves as Arabs. The largest subgroup was also by far Lebanese Americans, with 501,907, followed by Egyptian Americans (190,078), Syrian Americans (187,331,) and Iraqi Americans (105,981). Approximately one-fourth of all Arab Americans claimed two ancestries. A number of these ancestries are considered undercounted, given the nature of Ottoman immigration to the U.S. during the 19th and early 20th centuries.

A number of ethnic and ethnoreligious groups in West Asia and North Africa that lived in majority Arab countries and are now resident in the United States are not always classified as Arabs but some may claim an Arab identity or a dual Arab/non-Arab identity; they include Assyrians, Israelis, Jews (in particular Mizrahi Jews, some Sephardi Jews), Copts, Kurds, Iraqi Turkmens, Mandeans, Circassians, Shabaki, Armenians, Yazidis, Persians, Kawliya/Romani, Syrian Turkmens, Berbers, and Nubians.

== Population ==
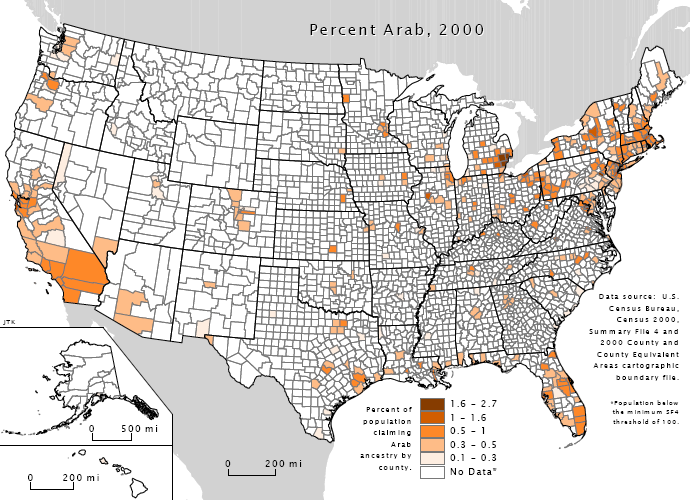
Map depicting Arabs in the United States, according to the 2000 census

The majority of Arab Americans, around 62%, originate from the region of the Levant, which includes Syria, Lebanon, Israel, Palestine, and Jordan, although overwhelmingly from Lebanon. The remainder are made up of those from Egypt, Morocco, Algeria, Iraq, Libya, the Gulf Cooperation Council, and other Arab nations.

There are nearly 3.5 million Arab Americans in the United States according to The Arab American Institute and more than 2.9 million according to the U.S. 2020 Census. Arab Americans live in all 50 states and in Washington, D.C., and 94% reside in the metropolitan areas of major cities. According to the 2010 US census, the city with the largest percentage of Arab Americans is Dearborn, Michigan, a southwestern suburb of Detroit, at nearly 40%. The Detroit metropolitan area is home to the largest concentration of Arab Americans (403,445), followed by the New York City Combined Statistical Area (371,233), Los Angeles (308,295), San Francisco Bay Area (250,000), Chicago (176,208), and the Washington, D.C., area (168,208). This information is reportedly based upon survey findings but is contradicted by information posted on the Arab American Institute website itself, which states that California as a whole only has 272,485, and Michigan as a whole only 191,607. The 2010 American Community Survey information, from the American Factfinder website, gives a figure of about 168,000 for Michigan.

According to the 2000 US census, 48% of the Arab American population, 576,000, reside in California, Michigan, New York, Florida, and New Jersey, respectively; these 5 states collectively account for 31% of the US population. Five other states – Illinois, Texas, Ohio, Massachusetts, and Pennsylvania – report Arab American populations of more than 40,000 each. Also, the counties with the greatest proportions of Arab Americans were in California, Michigan, New York, Florida, New Jersey, Ohio, Pennsylvania, and Virginia.

In 2016, the cities with 100,000 or more in population with the highest percentages of Arabs are Sterling Heights, Michigan 3.69%; Jersey City, New Jersey 2.81%; Warren, Michigan 2.51%; Allentown, Pennsylvania 2.45%; Burbank, California 2.39% and nearby Glendale, California 2.07%; Livonia, Michigan 1.94%; Arlington County, Virginia 1.77%; Paterson, New Jersey 1.77%; and Daly City, California 1.69%.

Bayonne, New Jersey, a city of 73,000, reported an Arab American population of 17.0% in the 2020 US census.

=== Arab American ethnic groups ===
Arab Americans in the 2000 – 2010 US census (Note: In this list are not included Sudanese since, in 2000 and 2010, Sudan and South Sudan were yet one country and yet we only have quantitative data from these groups together. Only the people of Northern Sudan are Arabs, but most Sudanese Americans hailed from the South Sudan. The 2000 – 2010 US Census indicate not the number of Americans of Sudanese (excluding South Sudanese) origin or descent.) – 2020 US census
Ancestry	2000	2000 (% of US population)	2010	2010 (% of US population)	2020 (alone or in any combination)	2020 (% of US population)
Lebanese	440,279	0.2%	501,988	%	685,672	%
Syrian	142,897	0.1%	148,214	%	222,193	%
Egyptian	142,832	0.1%	181,762	%	396,854	%
Palestinians	unsurveyed	%	85,186	%	174,887	%
Jordanian	39,734	0.03%	61,664	%	121,917	%
Moroccan	38,923	0.03%	82,073	%	147,528	%
Iraqi	37,714	0.01%	105,981	%	212,875	%
Yemeni	11,654	0.005%	29,358	%	91,288	%
Algerian	8,752	%	14,716	%	38,186	%
Saudi	7,419	%		%	30,563	%
Tunisian	4,735	%		%	15,270	%
Kuwaiti	3,162	%		%	6,923	%
Libyan	2,979	%		%	13,681	%
Emirati	459	%		%	2,480	%
Omani	351	%		%	1,336	%
Bahraini	Unknown (less than 300)	%		%	973	%
Qatari	Unknown (less than 300)	%		%	650	%
"North African"	3,217	%		%		%
"Arabs"	85,151	%	290,893	%	238,921	%
"Arabic"	120,665	%		%		%
Other Arabs		%	224,241	%	292,612	%
Total	1,160,729	0.4%	1,697,570	0.6%	2,928,448	%

=== Arab population by state (2010) ===
The US Census Bureau calculates the number of Arab Americans based on the number of people who claimed at least one Arab ancestry as one of their two ancestries. The Arab American Institute surveys the number of people of Arab descent in the US, regardless of the number of people who claimed Arab descent in the census.

State/territory	2010 American Census	Percentage	Arab American Institute (AAI)	Percentage
Alabama	9,057	0.189	34,308	No data
Alaska	1,356	0.191	4,464	No data
Arizona	29,474	0.461	95,427	No data
Arkansas	5,019	0.172	14,472	No data
California	269,917	0.616	817,455	No data
Colorado	27,526	0.074	51,149	No data
Connecticut	17,917	0.501	57,747	No data
Delaware	1,092	0.122	9,000	No data
District of Columbia	4,810	0.799	10,821	No data
Florida	114,791	0.610	301,881	No data
Georgia	25,504	0.263	81,171	No data
Hawaii	1,661	0.122	4,983	No data
Idaho	1,200	0.077	7,617	No data
Illinois	87,936	0.685	256,395	No data
Indiana	19,049	0.294	46,122	No data
Iowa	6,426	0.211	17,436	No data
Kansas	8,099	0.281	23,868	No data
Kentucky	10,199	0.235	28,542	No data
Louisiana	11,996	0.265	50,031	No data
Maine	3,103	0.234	13,224	No data
Maryland	28,623	0.496	76,446	No data
Massachusetts	67,643	1.033	195,450	No data
Michigan	153,713	1.555	500,000	No data
Minnesota	11,138	0.196	32,406	No data
Mississippi	6,823	0.230	20,469	No data
Missouri	18,198	0.304	51,869	No data
Montana	1,771	0.179	5,313	No data
Nebraska	6,093	0.334	25,227	No data
Nevada	10,920	0.404	37,554	No data
New Hampshire	6,958	0.529	25,068	No data
New Jersey	84,558	0.962	257,868	No data
New Mexico	7,716	0.375	13,632	No data
New York	160,848	0.830	449,187	No data
North Carolina	33,230	0.348	91,788	No data
North Dakota	1,470	0.186	4,410	No data
Ohio	65,011	0.564	197,439	No data
Oklahoma	9,342	0.249	No data	No data
Oregon	13,055	0.341	41,613	No data
Pennsylvania	63,288	0.498	182,610	No data
Rhode Island	7,566	0.719	26,541	No data
South Carolina	9,106	0.197	32,223	No data
South Dakota	2,034	0.250	6,102	No data
Tennessee	24,447	0.385	71,025	No data
Texas	102,367	0.407	274,701	No data
Utah	5,539	0.200	17,556	No data
Vermont	2,583	0.413	7,749	No data
Virginia	59,348	0.742	169,587	No data
Washington	26,666	0.397	8,850	No data
West Virginia	6,329	0.342	16,581	No data
Wisconsin	22,478	0.424	60,663	No data
Wyoming	397	0.070	1,191	No data
USA	1,646,371	0.533	3,700,000	No data

== Religious background ==
The religious affiliations of Arab Americans as of 2002
1. Catholic (35.0%)
2. Orthodox (18.0%)
3. Protestant (10.0%)
4. Muslim (24.0%)
5. Other (13.0%)

According to the Arab American Institute based on the Zogby International Survey in 2002, the breakdown of religious affiliation among persons originating from Arab countries is as follows:

- 63% Christian
  - 35% Latin/Eastern Catholic
  - 18% Orthodox, including Antiochian, Syrian, Greek, and Coptic
  - 10% Protestant
- 24% Muslim, including Sunni, Shia, and Druze
- 13% other or no affiliation

The percentage of Arab Americans who are Muslim has increased in recent years because most new Arab immigrants tend to be Muslim. In the past 10 years, most Arab immigrants were Muslim as compared to 15 to 30 years ago when they were mostly Christian. This stands in contrast to the first wave of Arab immigration to the US between the late 19th and early 20th centuries when almost all immigrants were Christians. Those Arabs were often Eastern Orthodox, otherwise Catholic and a few Episcopalians. A small number are Protestant adherents, either having joined a Protestant denomination after immigrating to the US or being from a family that converted to Protestantism while still living in the Eastern Mediterranean (European and American Protestant missionaries were fairly commonplace in the Levant in the late 19th and early 20th centuries).

Arab Christians, especially from Lebanon, Iraq, Palestine, Jordan, Syria, and Egypt, continued to immigrate to the US in the 2000s and form new enclaves and communities across the country.

The US is the second largest home of Druze communities outside the Middle East after Venezuela (60,000). According to some estimates there are about 30,000 to 50,000 Druzes in the US, with the largest concentration in Southern California. Most Druze immigrated to the US from Lebanon and Syria.

The New York City metropolitan area has a large population of Arab Jews and Mizrahi Jews. New York City and its suburbs in New Jersey have sizable Syrian Sephardi populations. Syrian Jews and other Jews from Arab countries may or may not identify as Arab Americans. When Syrian Jews first began to arrive in New York City during the late 1800s and early 1900s, Eastern European Ashkenazi Jews on the Lower East Side sometimes disdained their Syrian co-coreligionists as Arabische Yidden, Yiddish for "Arab Jews". Some Ashkenazim doubted whether Sephardi or Mizrahi Jews from the Middle East were Jewish at all. In response, some Syrian Jews who were deeply proud of their ancient Jewish heritage, derogatorily dubbed Ashkenazi Jews as "J-Dubs", a reference to the first and third letters of the English word "Jew". In the 1990 US census, there were 11,610 Arab Jews in New York City, comprising 23 percent of the total Arab population of the city. Arab Jews in the city sometimes face anti-Arab racism. After the September 11 attacks, some Arab Jews in New York City were subjected to arrest and detention because they were suspected to be Islamist terrorists.

== Arab American identity ==
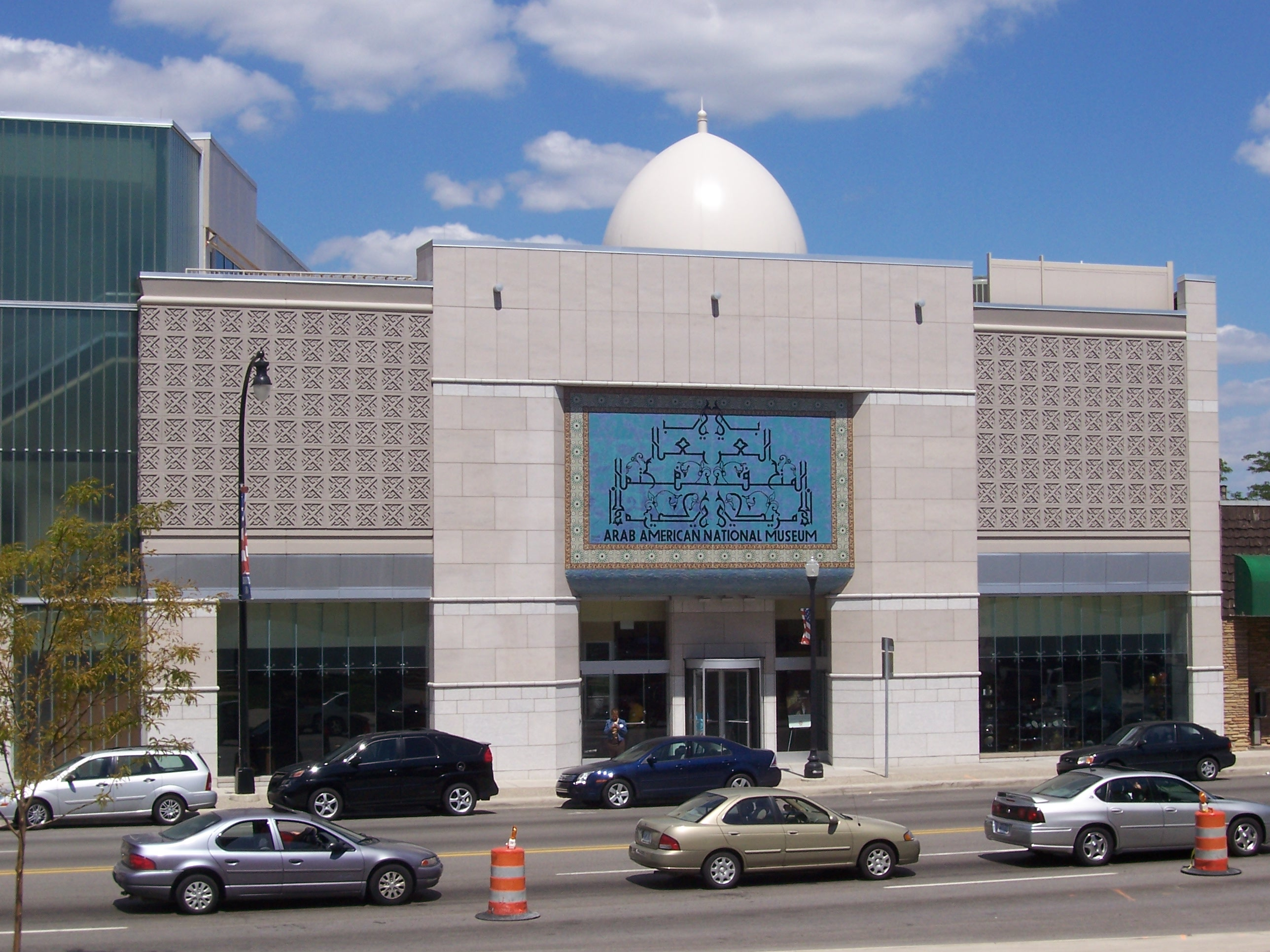
The Arab American National Museum in Dearborn, Michigan, celebrates the history of Arab Americans.

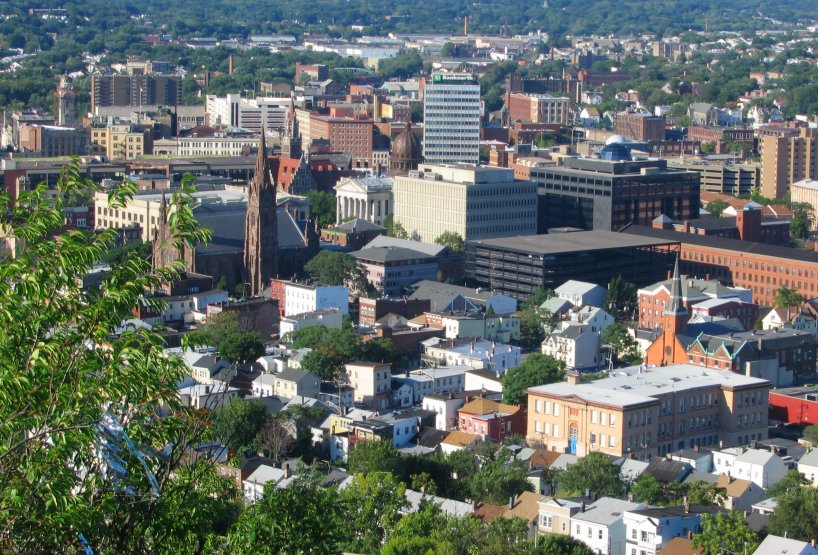
Paterson, New Jersey, has been nicknamed Little Ramallah and contains a neighborhood with the same name, with an Arab American population estimated as high as 20,000 in 2015.

In 2012, prompted in part by post-9/11 discrimination, the American-Arab Anti-Discrimination Committee petitioned the Department of Commerce's Minority Business Development Agency to designate the MENA populations as a minority/disadvantaged community. Following consultations with MENA organizations, the Census Bureau announced in 2014 that it would establish a new MENA ethnic category for populations from West Asia, North Africa or the Arab world, separate from the white classification that these populations had previously sought in 1909. The expert groups, including some Jewish organizations, felt that the earlier white designation no longer accurately represents MENA identity, so they lobbied for a distinct categorization. The 2020 census did not include a separate MENA race category and collected detailed ethnicity information.

In the 2015 National Content Test (NCT) for the 2020 Census, the sampling strata for the new MENA category includes the Census Bureau's working classification of 19 MENA groups, as well as Sudanese, Djiboutian, Somali, Mauritanian, Armenian, Cypriot, Afghan, Iranian, Azerbaijani, and Georgian groups.

On 28 March 2024, the Office of Management and Budget published revisions to Statistical Policy Directive No. 15: Standards for Maintaining, Collecting, and Presenting Federal Data on Race and Ethnicity that included the addition of "Middle Eastern or North African" to the race and/or ethnicity categories.

The Arab American Institute and other groups have noted that there was a rise in hate crimes targeting the Arab American community as well as people perceived as Arab/Muslim after the September 11 attacks and the US-led 2003 invasion of Iraq.

A new Zogby Poll International found that there are 3.5 million Americans who were identified as "Arab-Americans", or Americans of ancestry belonging to one of the 23 UN member countries of the Arab World (these are not necessarily therefore Arabs). Poll finds that, overall, a majority of those identifying as Arab Americans are Lebanese Americans (largely as a result of being the most numerous group). The Paterson, New Jersey-based Arab American Civic Association runs an Arabic language program in the Paterson school district. Paterson, New Jersey has been nicknamed Little Ramallah and contains a neighborhood with the same name, with an Arab American population estimated as high as 20,000 in 2015. Neighboring Clifton, New Jersey, is following in Paterson's footsteps, with rapidly growing Arab, Muslim, and Palestinian American populations.

== Politics ==
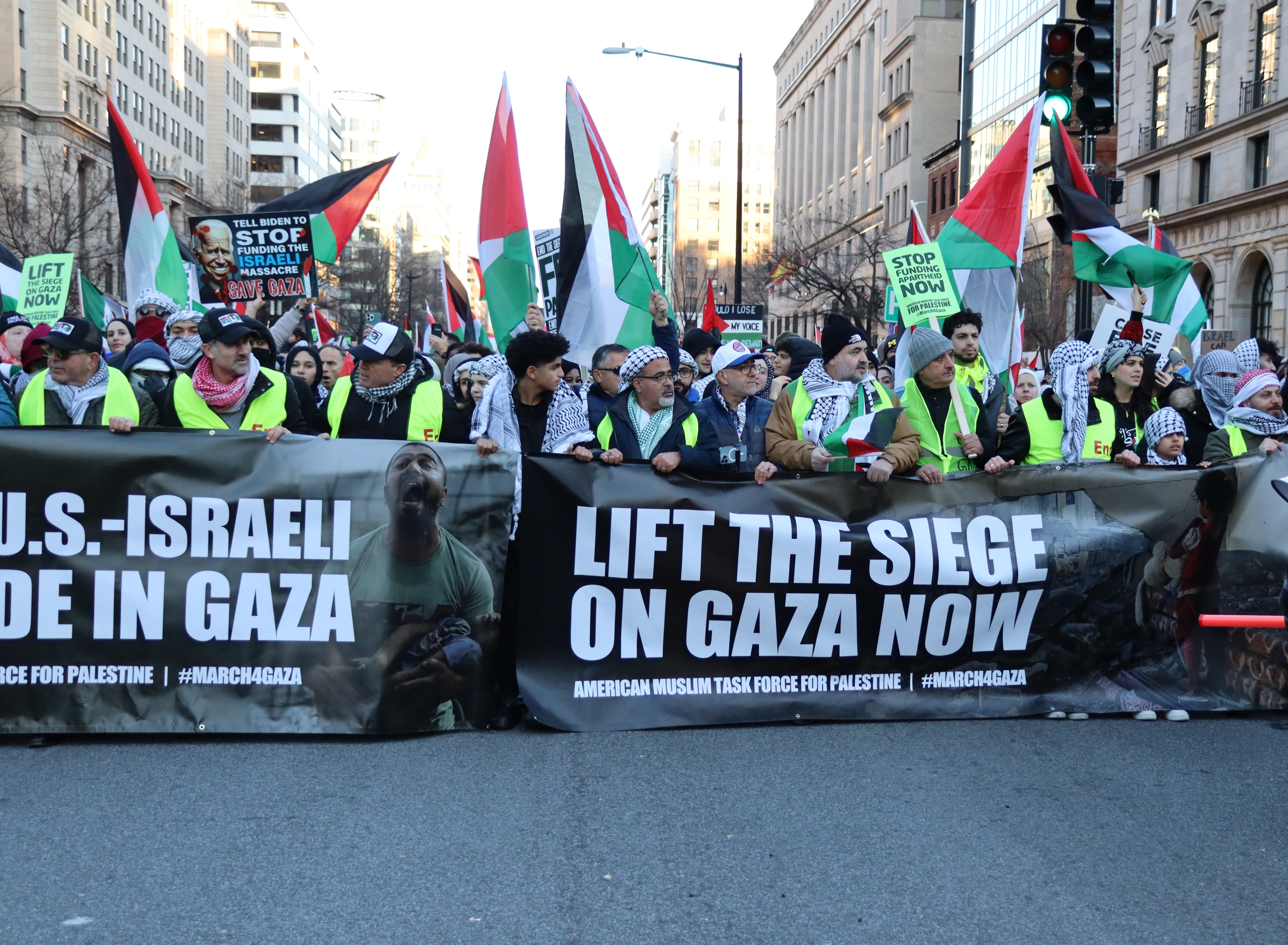
March on Washington for Gaza in January 2024

In a 2007 Zogby poll, 62% of Arab Americans voted Democratic, while only 25% voted Republican. The percentage of Arabs voting Democratic increased sharply during the Iraq War. However, a number of prominent Arab American politicians are Republicans, including former Oregon Governor Victor Atiyeh, former New Hampshire Senator John E. Sununu, and California Congressman Darrell Issa, who was the driving force behind the state's 2003 recall election that removed Democratic Governor Gray Davis from office. The first woman Supreme Court Chief Justice in Florida, Rosemary Barkett, who is of Syrian descent, is known for her dedication to progressive values.

Arab Americans gave George W. Bush a majority of their votes in 2000. However, they backed John Kerry in 2004 and Barack Obama in both 2008 and 2012. They also backed Hillary Clinton in 2016 and Joe Biden in 2020.

According to a 2000 Zogby poll, 52% of Arab Americans were anti-abortion, 74% support the death penalty, 76% were in favor of stricter gun control, and 86% wanted to see an independent Palestinian state.

In a study, first-generation Arab Americans living in Detroit were found to have values more similar to that of the Arab world than those of the general population living in Detroit, on average, being more closely aligned to the strong traditional values and survival values. This was less the case when participants were secular or belonged to second and subsequent generations.

An 30 October 2023 poll by the Arab American Institute found that support for Biden among Arab Americans dropped from 59% in 2020 to 17%. The drop in support has been attributed to the administration's handling of the 2023 Israel-Gaza War and Gaza genocide.

== Non-Arab Americans from Arab countries ==
There are many US immigrants from the Arab world who are not always classified as Arabs because through much of the Arabized world, Arabs were considered a colonizing force and many ethnic groups maintained their ethnic cultural and religious heritage, oftentimes through syncretism. Among these are Armenian Americans, Assyrian Americans, Kurdish Americans, Jewish Americans of Mizrahi origin. Some of these groups, such as Assyrians, are Semitic language speakers, while the vast majority of the rest are not Semitic language speakers. It is very difficult to estimate the size of these communities. For example, some Armenians immigrated to the US from Lebanon, Syria, or Iraq. Estimates place these communities at least in the tens of thousands. Other smaller communities include Assyrians, Amazigh/Berber, Turks, Mandeans, Circassians, Shabaks, Georgians, Yazidis, Balochs, Iranians, Azerbaijanis, and Kawliya/Roma.

Most of these ethnic groups speak their own native languages (usually another Semitic language related to Arabic) and have their own customs, along with the Arabic dialect from the Arab country they originate from.

== Culture ==
=== Arab American Heritage Month ===
In 2014, Montgomery County, Maryland, designated April as Arab American Heritage Month in recognition of the contributions that Arab Americans have made to the nation. Arab America and the Arab America Foundation launched the National Arab American Heritage Month initiative in 2017, with just a handful of states recognizing the initiative. Each year, the Arab America Foundation activates a grass-roots network of over 250 Arab American volunteers in 26 states. It gathers hundreds of proclamations from state governments, counties, municipalities, and local school districts. The first documentary on Arab Americans premiered on PBS in August 2017, "The Arab Americans" features the Arab American immigrant story as told through the lens of American History and the stories of prominent Arab Americans such as actor Jamie Farr, Ralph Nader, Senator George Mitchell, White House Reporter Helen Thomas, Pulitzer Prize-winning journalist Anthony Shadid, Danny Thomas actor and Founder of St. Jude Children's Research Hospital, pollster and author John Zogby, Congressman Nick Rahall, racing legend Bobby Rahal. The documentary is produced and directed by Abe Kasbo.

The US Department of State has recognized April as the National Arab American Heritage Month, making it the highest level of federal recognition, yet. Stating in a public announcement on 1 April 2021, through their official social media channels: "Americans of Arab heritage are very much a part of the fabric of this nation, and Arab Americans have contributed in every field and profession."

The recognition of the month of April as the National Arab American Heritage Month by the US Department of State was mainly influenced by independent advocate efforts across the United States calling for inclusivity. Most notably the petition and social change campaign by Pierre Subeh, who is a Middle-Eastern American business expert, executive producer, and author. He orchestrated a self-funded social awareness campaign with over 250 billboards across the country asking the Federal government to recognize the month of April as the National Arab American Heritage Month and issue an official proclamation. His social change campaign called the recognition to be critical as it celebrates Middle Eastern heritage in combating post-9/11 anti-Arab sentiments and recognizing the social difficulties that Arab Americans face every day in their communities.

In 2023, President Joe Biden issued an official proclamation on the Arab American Heritage Month.

=== Cuisine ===
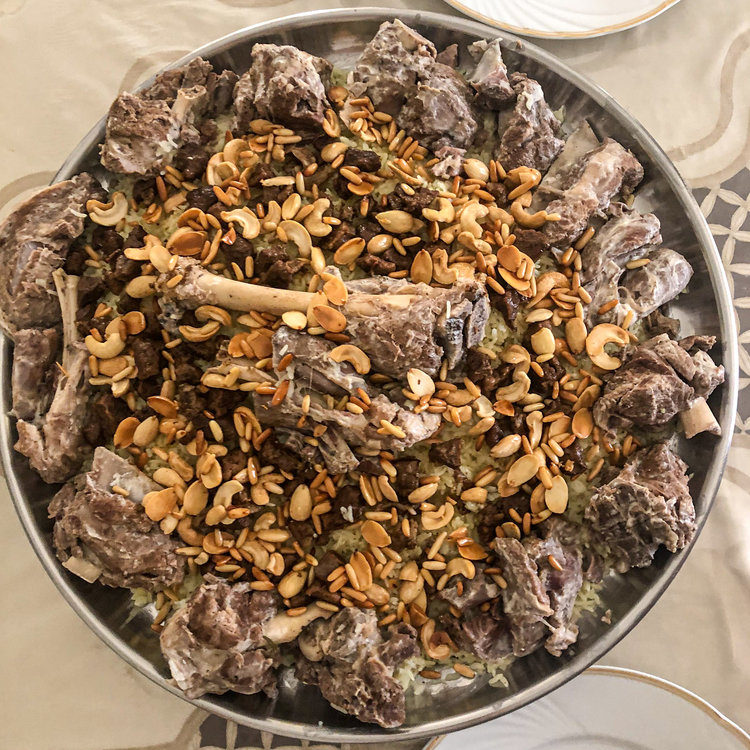
Mansaf, a popular Arab lamb dish

A variety of traditional Arab dishes are eaten by Arab Americans, often by substituting out traditional ingredients for modern or Western elements.

== Festivals ==
While the spectrum of Arab heritage includes 22 countries, their combined heritage is often celebrated in cultural festivals around the United States.

New York City

The Annual Arab-American & North African Street Festival was founded in 2002 by the Network of Arab-American Professionals of NY (NAAP-NY). Located in downtown Manhattan, on Great Jones Street between Lafayette & Broadway, the Festival attracts an estimated 15,000 people, in addition to over 30 Arab and North African vendors along with an all-day live cultural performance program representing performers from across the Arab world.

The New York Arab American Comedy Festival was founded in 2003 by comedian Dean Obeidallah and comedian Maysoon Zayid. Held annually each fall, the festival showcases the talents of Arab American actors, comics, playwrights, and filmmakers, and challenges as well as inspires fellow Arab Americans to create outstanding works of comedy. Participants include actors, directors, writers and comedians.

Seattle

Of particular note is ArabFest in Seattle, begun in 1999. The festival includes all 22 of the Arab countries, with a souk marketplace, traditional and modern music, an authentic Arab coffeehouse, an Arabic spelling bee, and a fashion show. Lectures and workshops explore the rich culture and history of the Arab peoples, one of the world's oldest civilizations. Also of new interest is the Arabic rap concert, including the NW group Sons of Hagar, showcasing the political and creative struggle of Arabic youth.

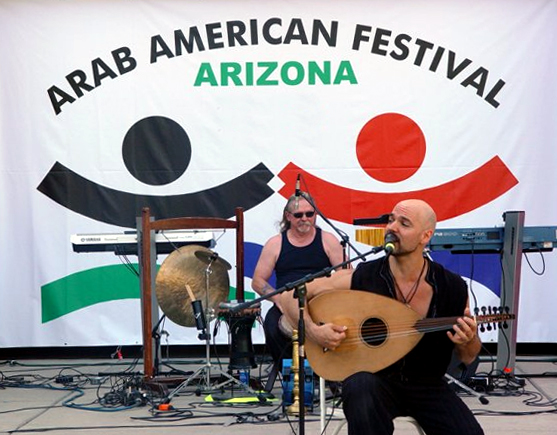
Arab American Festival – Arizona

Phoenix

In 2008, the first annual Arab American Festival in Arizona was held on 1 and 2 November in Glendale, Arizona. There were more than 40,000 attendees over the two-day event; more than 35 international singers, dancers, and musicians from all over the Arab World performed 20 hours of live entertainment on stage. Activities included folklore shows, an international food court, hookah lounge, kids rides and booth vendors, open to the public, and admission was free.

California

The Annual Arab American Day Festival is a three-day cultural and entertainment event held in Orange County. Activities include book and folk art exhibitions, speeches from community leaders in the county, as well as music and poetry, dancing singing, traditional food, hookah and much more.

Wisconsin

Since 1996, Milwaukee's Arab World Fest has been part of the summer festival season. It is held on the second weekend of August. This three-day event hosts music, culture, and food celebrating the 22 Arab countries. The festival features live entertainment, belly dancing, hookah rental, camel rides, cooking demonstrations, a children's area, and Arab cuisine. It is a family-friendly festival on Milwaukee's lakefront.

== Notable people ==
Saint Levant (born 2000): Singer, song-writer, and rapper

DJ Khaled (born 1975) : DJ and record producer

George A. Kasem (1919–2002) : Politician, First Arab Congressman

James Abourezk (1931–2023) : Politician, First Arab Senator and founder of the American-Arab Anti-Discrimination Committee

Ray LaHood (born 1945) : Politician, 16th Secretary of Transportation

Ralph Nader (born 1934): Political activist, author of Unsafe at Any Speed

Spencer Abraham (born 1952): Politician, 10th Secretary of Energy and senator from Michigan

== See also ==
- American-Arab Anti-Discrimination Committee
- Arab American Institute
- Arab American Political Action Committee
- Arab Community Center for Economic and Social Services
- Arab American literature
- Arab diaspora
- Arab immigration to the United States
- Arab lobby in the United States
- Arabs in Europe
- Diaspora politics in the United States
- History of the Middle Eastern people in Metro Detroit
- Hyphenated American
- Iraqi diaspora
- Islam in the United States
- Islam in Europe
- List of American Muslims
- Refugees of Iraq
