= Tunisian Community Center =

- Founded: 1999
- Key people: Ali Khemili (founder, executive director); Sami Guedoir (advisory board chairman)
- Focus: The Tunisian American community, outreach to Tunisia and strengthening Tunisian-American relations
- Website: TunisianCommunity.org

Tunisian Community Center (Arabic: المركز التّونسيّ الأمريكيّ), also known as the Tunisian American Center, is a US-based non-profit organization founded in 1999 dedicated to community building and cultural outreach for Tunisian Americans and strengthening their relations. It organizes multiple programs and events throughout the nation.

== Recognition ==
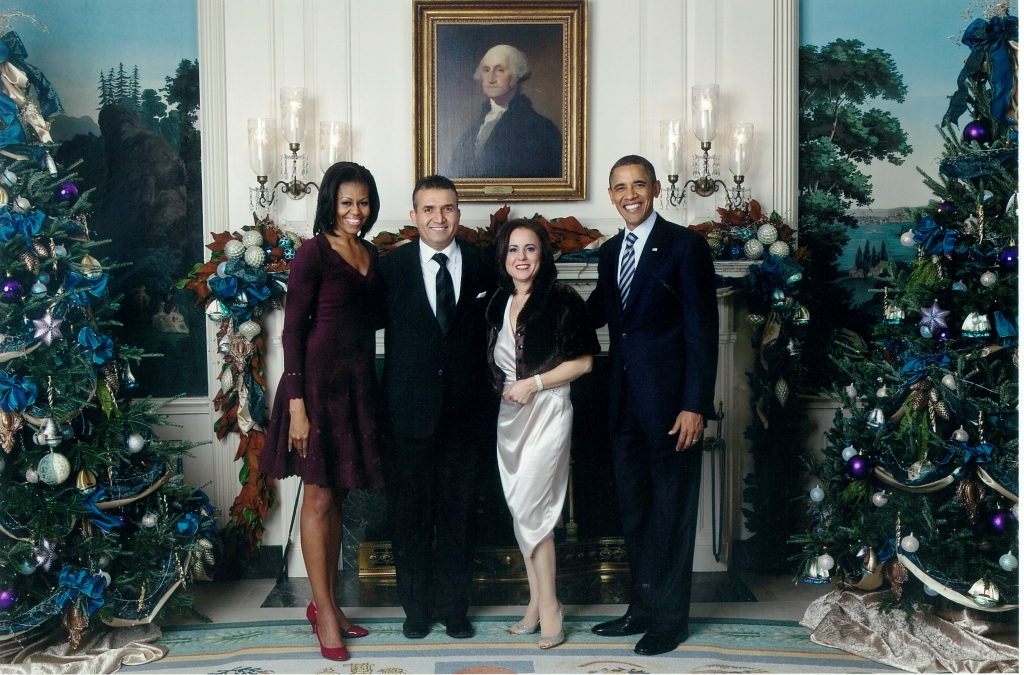
TCC Chairman at the White House

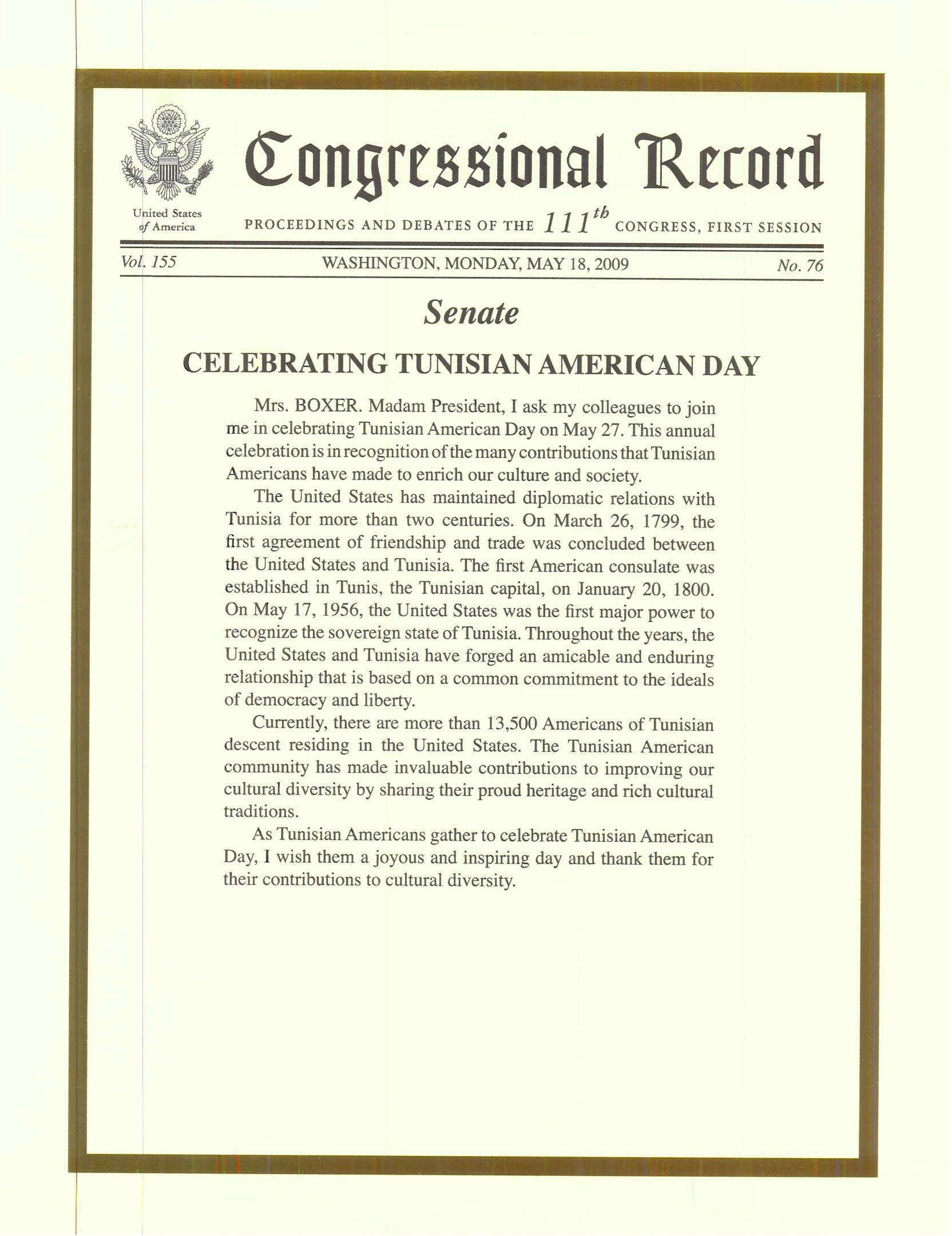
Congressional statement

The US Senate has recognized Tunisian American's contributions in the United States, confirming the long-term American-Tunisian relationship for over two decades. In 2009 the Tunisian American Day received official endorsement from the United States Congress.

In December 2011, President Barack Obama honored the Tunisian American Center by inviting the Organization's Chairman Sami Guedoir, and his wife Nadia, to the White House for a dinner reception.

== Activities ==
The Tunisian American Center has organized multiple programs and events. In their support for the Tunisian Revolution's aims toward freedom and democracy, the organization wrote to the US Senator of California Barbara Boxer, requesting to freeze the overthrown President Zine El Abidine Ben Ali's assets.

=== Tunisian American Day ===
In 2005, The Tunisian American Center established the May 27 Tunisian American Day tradition. It represents a recurring opportunity to celebrate its community and its heritage, as well as the enduring Tunisian-American friendship.

Organized in a different US city every year, it is commemorated during a celebration (Arabic: hafla) that coincides with the birthday anniversary of the organization's cultural symbol, Ibn Khaldun. The event includes the Ibn Khaldun Award presentation ceremony, as well as live Tunisian music entertainment and catered Tunisian dinner.

=== Community Gazette ===
The Community Gazette is a monthly electronic newsletter, containing news and highlights of interest to the Tunisian American community.

=== Ibn Khaldun Institute ===
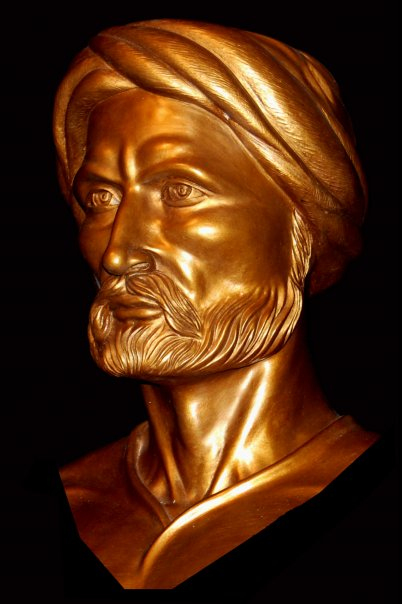
Life-size bronze bust sculpture of Ibn Khaldun that is part of the collection at the Arab American National Museum (Catalog Number 2010.02). It was commissioned by the Tunisian American Center and created by Patrick Morelli of Albany, New York in 2009.

The Ibn Khaldun Institute, an affiliate of the Tunisian American Center, is a non-partisan, non-profit and secular advocacy type of think tank. Its focus is on the socio-economic development of Tunisia.

It is composed of Tunisian and Tunisian-American professionals in all disciplines, dedicated to promoting business as well as cultural and professional exchanges between the United States and Tunisia. It also connects Tunisian-American professionals with decision-makers in both countries.

The Ibn Khaldun Institute is also an online clearinghouse for information on activities in the United States that aim to promote the development of Tunisia.

The Ibn Khaldun Institute launched the annual Ibn Khaldun Award in 2004, recognizing high achievers who rendered a service to the Tunisian American community. It also launched the Aboulkacem Chebbi Student of the Year award, recognizing future leaders who made their mark through academic achievements and a commitment to excellence, and who demonstrated a high level of effort to promote the Tunisian culture at campuses across America.

=== Tunisian Student Federation ===
The Tunisian Student Federation (TSF) is a Tunisian American Center entity that federates Tunisian Student Clubs (TSC) at American university campuses. Its specific mission is to represent the interests of Tunisian students in the United States and serve their needs, while contributing to the overall mission of the organization.

=== Club Hannibal-USA ===
The Hannibal-USA Society, an entity within the Tunisian American Center, is a non-partisan, non-profit and secular Advocacy type project. It aims to be a forum for American friends of Tunisia who share their commitment to making Tunisia better known on the American political scene.

The society was named after the legendary Carthaginian general and lawmaker Hannibal Barca, whose genius earned him the title of "father of strategy" and whose vision of world trade inspired generations throughout history. By dispatching its members throughout the United States, the society aims to expand on Barca's vision of world trade and promote Tunisian-American friendship.
