= Arab immigration to the United States =

Arab immigration to the United States began before the United States achieved independence in 1776. Since the first major wave of Arab immigration in the late 19th century, the majority of Arab immigrants have settled in or near large cities. Roughly 94 percent of all Arab immigrants live in metropolitan areas, While most Arabic-speaking Americans have similarly settled in just a handful of major American cities, they form a fairly diverse population representing nearly every country and religion from the Arab world. These figures aside, recent demographics suggest a shift in immigration trends. While the earliest waves of Arab immigrants were predominantly Christian, since the late 1960s an increasing proportion of Arab immigrants are Muslim. Arab immigration has, historically, come in waves. Many came for entrepreneurial reasons, and during the latter waves some came as a result of struggles and hardships stemming from specific periods of war or discrimination in their respective mother countries.

== Colonial North America ==
Historians have uncovered some information about Arab Americans during the American Revolutionary War, which estimates around four Arab Americans served in the Continental Army. The first Arab American to die for America was Private Nathan Badeen, a Syrian immigrant who died on May 23, 1776, just a month and a half before American independence.

During the American Revolutionary War, horses exported from the Ottoman Empire replenished the American cavalry. Morocco was the first country to officially recognize the independence of the United States in 1787 in what is known as the Moroccan–American Treaty of Friendship.

== 1870s–1920s ==
While Arabs have been immigrating individually to North America since before the United States became a nation, the first significant period of Arab immigration began in the 1870s and lasted until 1924, when the Johnson-Reed Quota Act was passed, nearly ending immigration from this region for the time being. During this period, an estimated 110,000 immigrants entered the United States predominantly from the Ottoman province of Syria, which currently encompasses the countries of Syria, Lebanon, Jordan, and Palestine.

Arabs immigrating prior to that decade from modern-day Lebanon were regarded as "Syrians" and were a predominantly Christian population. These early immigrants were variously classified as Turk, Armenian, and/or Arab, until 1899, when the Immigration and Naturalization Service created a Syrian category. In the 1920s, with the Lebanese nationalist movement and the establishment of Lebanon as an independent nation state, immigrants from what is now modern Lebanon started adopting a Lebanese national identity.

During this period, there was also a small percentage of Arab Muslim and Druze immigrants, though the size of these groups is hard to determine. Arab Christians historically had a much easier time immigrating to the United States than did Muslims. During this first wave of immigration, greater Syria was still under Ottoman control, but tensions existed between the Arab Muslims and Christians. Out of this environment, many "Syrians" seized this opportunity to emigrate in hopes of a better life, and many came to the United States. Many of the early Arab immigrants thought of themselves as sojourners or al-Nizaleh, and established themselves as peddlers.

=== Statistics ===
- New York and Ellis Island were the gateways for a large number of immigrants coming from the Middle East. By 1900, more than half of all Arabs in America resided in New York while a great many others lived across the Hudson River in New Jersey. Many of the first immigrants from this region became involved in the New York and New Jersey garment industry. By 1924, there were 25 Arab-owned and -operated silk factories in Paterson and West Hoboken, New Jersey alone.
- During the first wave of immigration, Arab men outnumbered Arab women at least four to one, causing a very high intermarriage rate over time. In fact, the 1990 census showed that more than 80 percent US-born Arab Americans had non-Arab spouses.
- Although only accounting for less than 10 percent of the total number of Arab immigrants to the United States, they had relatively large numbers in certain Midwestern towns. The majority were "attracted to the great booming midwestern factories of steel, tin automobiles, and trains in cities such as Pittsburgh, New Castle (Pennsylvania), Detroit, and Michigan City."

== 1920s–1960s ==
The end of the first wave of Arab immigration is often marked by the end of World War I and the restrictive immigration policies put in place by the United States in the interwar period, including the Immigration Act of 1917 (or Asiatic Barred Zone), Emergency Quota Act in 1921, and the Immigration Act of 1924 (or Johnson-Reed Act). Though the Greater Syria region was not impacted by the Asiatic Barred Zone, Arab immigration slowed greatly due to these restrictive quotas and the Great Depression from the late 1920s to the end of the 1940s, reducing immigration to the United States to less than 1,000 persons per year.

During this period, many Arabs in the United States focused on establishing businesses, especially dry good stores, grocery stores, and began entering manufacturing. Similarly, there was an increase in civic participation, community mobilization, and political activism.

In 1948, war had broken out between Arab states and Yishuv forces. The 1948 Arab–Israeli War sparked a mass migration of Arabs, primarily Palestinians. The war, which ended in 1949, displaced over 750,000 Palestinians, from a population of only 1.3 million, from their homeland. From 1948 until 1966, only 80,000 Arabs officially immigrated to the United States. Of these 80,000, the majority were ethnic Palestinians while the second largest group was made up of Egyptians. Many of the Arabs that immigrated between 1950 and 1965 were members of the established elite in countries like Egypt, Syria, and Iraq who fled due to popular revolutions and the new regimes that came with them. Moreover, whereas first-wave immigrants tended to go directly to the United States from their country of origin, for second-wave immigrants, the United States was often the second or third destination. Palestinian immigrants during this time commonly went to Jordan, Lebanon, Syria, or Egypt before making the journey to the United States.

== 1960s–2010s ==
The number of immigrants remained relatively small during the second wave of Arab immigration, primarily due to the restrictive immigration policies of the US. However, in 1965, the United States passed new immigration reforms, including the Immigration and Nationality Act of 1965, allowing a new wave of Arabs to immigrate. This new group of Arab immigrants was demographically similar to those that immigrated during the past 20 years; however, this wave differed largely in its scope and in their reasons for immigrating. In particular, Arab immigrants during this period were largely well-educated Muslims and children of previous immigrants. Between 1967 and 2003 some 757,626 Arabs came to the United States, nearly eleven times the number of immigrants during the second wave. Moreover, during this time, in addition to increasingly regular conflict between Israel and its Arab neighbors, this era was marked by widespread "intra-Arab warfare" and a general increase in religious, ethnic and sectarian tensions in the region. Also, the rise of Islamism in the Middle East during the past few decades helped further drain the region of its native Christian populations. Just as with the previous influx of Arab immigrants, the third major Arab immigration trend consisted of more Palestinians than any other group. The actual number of Palestinians who immigrated to the US during this time is not known because often the United States was not their first destination. Perhaps as many as a quarter of the nearly 800,000 Arabs that period were of Palestinian descent. The massive Palestinian exodus was further motivated by the 1967 Six-Day War. Further spurring Palestinian immigration were the intifada uprisings of 1987–1993 and 2000–2005.

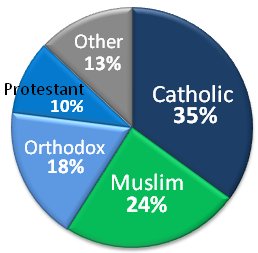
Arab American religions from 2002 Zogby International Institute Survey

Aside from Palestinians, Lebanese made up the next biggest group of immigrants during this time. From 1965 to 2005, around 135,000 Lebanese came to the United States. The overwhelming majority, roughly 120,000, came after the commencement of the Lebanese Civil War in 1975. Furthering the emigration from Lebanon was Israel's 1982 invasion. Egyptians and Iraqis also immigrated to the United States in large numbers during this period. From 1967 to 2003 more than 120,000 Egyptians have immigrated to the US. Of this population, around 50,000 were Coptic Christians. Also, since 1967, 108,000 Iraqis have come to the US. Many fled during the country's drawn-out war with Iran lasting from 1980 to 1988. Again, in keeping with the "brain-drain" trend of the region, a large portion of these immigrants were educated professionals not willing to serve in the army. Harsh United Nations sanctions following the Iraqi invasion of Kuwait further deteriorated Iraq's economy, increasing emigration. Between the first and second US invasions of Iraq roughly 53,000 Iraqis immigrated to the United States. Large numbers of Syrians and Yemenis immigrated to the United States during this wave as well. Since 1967, some 36,000 Syrians have immigrated to the US.

== Demographics ==
- Arab American Community by National Origin according to the 2000 US census.

Nationality	Arab American Population (%)
Lebanese	35
Egyptian	11
Syrian	11
Palestinian	6
Iraqi*	3
Moroccan	3
Jordanian	3
Arab	15
Other Arab**	17

*Excludes those who identify as Assyrians in Iraq.

**Includes those from Algeria, Bahrain, Comoro Islands, Djibouti, Kuwait, Libya, Oman, Qatar, Saudi Arabia, Tunisia, the United Arab Emirates, and Yemen. Does not include persons from Sudan, Somalia, or Mauritania.

- Today, Arabs make up roughly 1.2 percent of the overall US population.
- Between 1990 and 2000 the Arab American population increased by an estimated 30 percent.
- Lebanese are the largest group of Arab Americans in every state except for New Jersey, where Egyptians make up the largest nationality.
- 80 percent of Arabs living in the United States are citizens.
- As of the 2000 census, 40 percent of Arab Americans are first generation, a quarter of them having come since 1990.
- According to the 2000 census, 88 percent of Arab Americans work in the private sector. Specifically, 73 percent work in managerial, professional, technical, sales, or administrative fields.

== See also ==
- Arab Americans
