= We Are All Moors =

We Are All Moors: Ending Centuries of Crusades against Muslims and Other Minorities is a book by Anouar Majid, published by the University of Minnesota Press.

Published in 2009, it is in over 200 libraries and has been reviewed by the academic journal DISSENT, published by the University of Pennsylvania Press.

Majid is a Moroccan-American professor of English at the University of New England in Maine.
