= Amazigh Cultural Association in America =

Non-profit organization in the United States

- Tiddukla Tadelsant Tamaziɣt deg Marikan
- Abbreviation: ACAA (English); TTTM (Tamazight)
- Established: 1992
- Founded at: New Jersey, United States
- Type: Nonprofit, NGO
- Headquarters: New Jersey, United States
- Region served: United States
- Official language: English, Berber languages
- Website: tamazgha.org

The Amazigh Cultural Association in America (ACAA) is a non-profit organization established in New Jersey. This organization's goal is to promote the Amazigh (Berber) languages and culture in the world, based on the fact that, due to the North African emigration, today there are people of Amazigh origin worldwide. However, the partnership focuses mainly on North Africa and the United States, where it is headquartered.

The partnership aims to strengthen and revive the Berber culture. The association works with other associations, universities and scholars, and promotes information about Berber culture and language in the world.

== See also ==
- Berber Americans
- Maghreb Association of North America
- North Africa
- North Africans in the United States
