= Driss Temsamani =

American banker (born 1966)

Driss R. Temsamani
- إدريس التمسماني
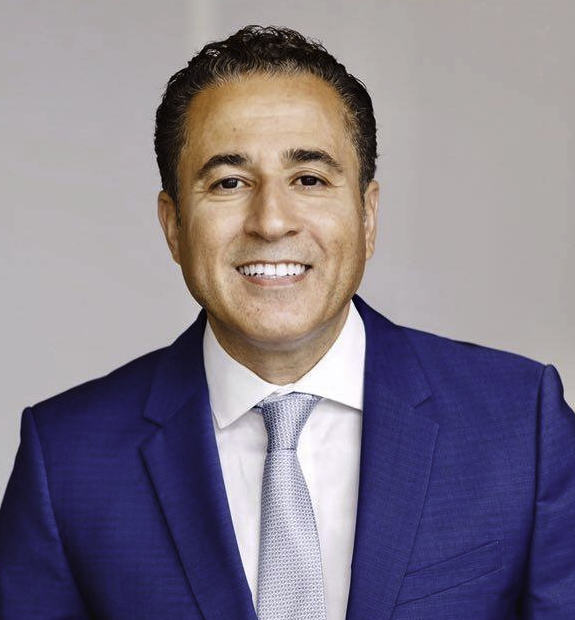
- Born: 1966 (age 59–60); Tangier, Morocco
- Citizenship: American
- Education: Columbus State University, IAE Universidad Austral, Harvard Business School
- Occupation: Managing Director at Citigroup
- Employer: Citigroup
- Known for: e-banking, digital transformation, Diaspora politics

Driss R. Temsamani (Arabic: إدريس التمسماني; born 1966) is a Moroccan-born American banker and writer. He is a managing director at Citigroup, where he heads digital banking for the Americas.

Temsamani has worked with Moroccan diaspora organizations and served as a delegate for the U.S. State Department's Global Entrepreneurship Program on President Barack Obama’s socioeconomic development initiatives in the Maghreb.

== Banking career ==
Temsamani joined Citigroup in 1995 as a senior consultant. Before that he was operations director at Telemundo from 1993 to 1995, and earlier worked at Globe Magazine and Worldcare International Insurance.

At Citigroup, Temsamani has led e-business (2000–2002), marketing and market management (2008–2012), the innovation group (2012–2017), and commercial banking for Latin America (2017–2021). He led the launch of Citi's digital account in Latin America and has worked with central banks and regulators on digital policy, financial inclusion, digital assets, blockchain, and artificial intelligence in the financial system.

== Diaspora advocacy ==
Temsamani has worked in different nonprofit organizations and policy-oriented projects to advance the social, political, and economic representation of Moroccan Americans, particularly in international forums. In 2002, He launched ElKarya, the first social platform in Moroccan Arabic (Darija), designed to connect Moroccan expatriates, particularly in North America. He is also the Founder and President of the 361 Degrees Institute, a Moroccan American think-tank for demographic research and development based in the US. In 2012, Temsamani founded the Maghreb Growth Foundation.

His advocacy focuses on initiatives related to education, civic engagement, and economic development that concern the Moroccan diaspora communities in the United States. Temsamani has been president and Board Director of the Moroccan American Coalition since 2008 and is on the Board of Directors of Junior Achievement Americas.

Temsamani was a partner in the Aspen Institute's Partners for a New Beginning, an initiative focused on strengthening economic and social collaboration between the United States and North African countries. He was selected by the U.S. State Department’s Global Entrepreneurship Program as a delegate for President Barack Obama’s socioeconomic development initiatives in the Maghreb. He was later invited to speak at the White House, where he addressed issues related to diaspora engagement and their economic empowerment.

== Writing and media ==
Temsamani writes on topics related to diaspora issues, finance, digital transformation, blockchain, AI, and financial inclusion. In 2005, he published an autobiographical work titled Rewind. It was a drama story of the human spirit's struggle to find happiness while away from home.

In the early 2000s, Temsamani lectured on marketing strategy and digital engagement, presenting on DNA Marketing and The Art of Marketing, which focused on branding, customer engagement, and digital strategy. During this period, he also spoke at COMDEX, where he discussed the Second Wave of the Internet and its impact on financial and digital transformation.

In recent years, he has spoken at various industry conferences covering topics such as the role of AI in treasury and finance, Blockchain and digital assets in banking, the impact of cryptocurrency on financial inclusion and the regulatory trends in financial technology. Temsamani has also been featured in print and television interviews, discussing digital transformation and financial innovation. He has appeared on CNN, where he spoke about the future of digital payments and financial inclusion. He has been interviewed by the Peruvian El Comercio, where he discussed tokenization and the transition of physical assets into the digital economy. In the Costa Rican La República, he discussed the impact of FinTech on financial markets, while in El Dinero, he elaborated on Citigroup's advancements toward fully digital corporate banking. In 2023, Temsamani participated in a Bloomberg-moderated panel discussion on cryptocurrencies, exploring the role of blockchain, digital assets, and financial regulation in the evolving financial landscape. He has also presented at the America Digital Congress where he discussed the tokenization of assets and digital transformation in the banking sector.

In 2025, he published The Agentic Bank: How AI and Intelligent Systems Are Redefining Finance. The book argues that AI and blockchain are transforming financial institutions into what he calls "agentic institutions," capable of thinking, acting, and adapting autonomously. It uses hypothetical case studies to argue that agentic systems will make banking more continuous and automated. He also argues that financial inclusion in Africa won't come from banks or any single fintech organization working independently. According to him, it requires a connected system that brings technology platforms, financial institutions, and regulators together.

== Awards ==
Temsamani received the Jerry Goldenberg first-place award for direct marketing in 2002, the Strathmore Who's Who Leadership Millennium Award in 2000, and was named Visionary of the Year by Compaq in 1999.

After joining Citibank as a digital leader, Citi received several awards, including being named the World's Best Digital Bank by Global Finance Magazine in 2022 for the 22nd consecutive year, awards from The Banker's Innovation in Digital Banking Awards and Technology Projects of the Year Awards in 2023, and being named the World's Best Digital Bank by Euromoney in 2024. In March 2025, he received the Golden Prize (Premio de Oro) in the category "Blockchain and Cryptocurrencies" as Americas head of digital at Citi Treasury and Trade Solutions.

== Personal life ==
Temsamani was born in Tangier, Morocco and is currently based in Miami, Florida. Before migrating to the US, he faced academic challenges and was nearly sent to a military academy. Seeing military school as an undesirable option, he decided to leave the country in 1986 at the age of 17 and immigrated to the United States with $200 in his pockets and without a strong command of the English language. While working, he took night classes to learn English and later enrolled in electronics courses, where he was first introduced to computers. In the following years, Temsamani enrolled himself in business studies. He is a holder of an MBA from Ohio State University, an Executive MBA in Industrial marketing from IAE Universidad Austral in Buenos Aires, Argentina and an Executive Leadership from Harvard.
