= Libyan Canadians =

Canadians of Libyan descent

Total population
- 3,570 - 7,945

Regions with significant populations
- Toronto, Montreal, Vancouver, Calgary, Edmonton, Ottawa, Winnipeg, Quebec City, Mississauga

Languages
- Libyan Arabic, English, French

Religion
- Islam

Libyan Canadians (Arabic: الليبيون الكنديون) are Canadians of Libyan descent.

Most Libyan Canadians speak Arabic, English or French. According to the 2020 "Canada national", there were 3,570 Canadians who claimed Libyan ancestry.

== Notable Libyan Canadians ==
- Arwa Abouon - photographer
- Muftah Ageli - CFL player
- Alaa Murabit - physician
- Michael Zehaf-Bibeau - perpetrator of the 2014 Parliament Hill shootings

== See also ==
- Arab Canadians
- Libyan Americans
