= Arwa Abouon =

Libyan-Canadian photographer

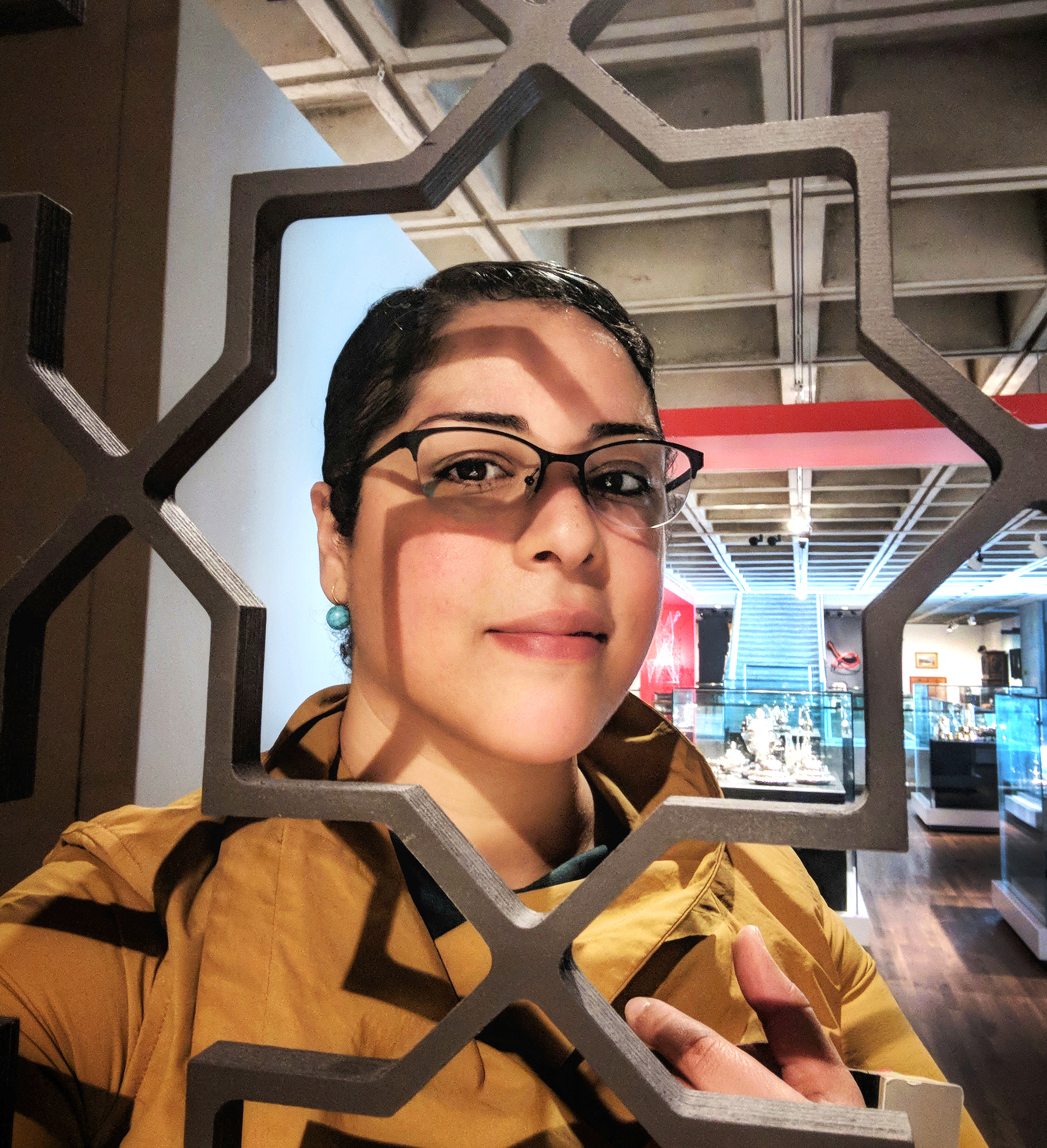
- Born: 1982; Tripoli, Libya
- Died: June 9, 2020
- Education: Bachelors of Fine Arts, Concordia University
- Known for: Photographer
- Website: arwaabouon.com

Arwa Abouon (1982 – 2020) was a Libyan-Canadian photographer.

== Biography ==
Abouon was born in Tripoli, Libya in 1982 and is of Amazigh descent. She immigrated to Canada with her family in 1983 in response to recruitment of young men by the Muammar Gaddafi regime. Her father, Mustafa Muhammad Abouon (1940–2013), feared for the safety of his sons.

Abouon studied at Concordia University in Montreal, Quebec, where she majored in design art and obtained a bachelor of fine arts, with distinction, in 2007. Her work draws heavily on her experience as an Islamic woman living in the West and it often incorporates traditional Islamic customs, clothing and icons alongside symbols of Western cultural. She explains that the goal of her work "is to sculpt a finer appreciation of the Islamic culture by shifting the focus from political issues to a poetic celebration of the faith's foundations."

Abouon's work has been displayed internationally at galleries in Canada, the United States, Europe, Asia, and Middle East. Her diptych Mirror Mirror, Allah Allah won second prize at the 26th annual Alexandra Biennale for Mediterranean Countries Award in 2014. Art critic Valerie Behiery noted that the piece, which shows reflections of Abouon dressed in a veil and without, provides commentary with "deliberate visual simplicity and humour". She died in Montreal on June 9, 2020.

== Major exhibitions ==
- 2012 - Learning by Heart - The Third Line Gallery, Dubai
- 2014 - Honolulu - Sultan Gallery, Kuwait
- 2015 - Birthmark Theory - London Print Studio, London, UK
- 2017 - Sanctuary - FOR-SITE Foundation, Fort Mason Chapel, San Francisco, California https://www.for-site.org/project/sanctuary/
- 2018 - Connections: Our Artistic Diversity Dialogues with Our Collections, Montreal Museum of Fine Arts
