= Libyan Americans =

Americans of Libyan birth or descent

Total population
- By ancestry or ethnic origin (2020 US Census); 13,681

Regions with significant populations
- California

Languages
- Arabic (Libyan Arabic), American English, Amazigh languages, Hebrew (Jewish population)

Religion
- Sunni Islam, Judaism

Libyan Americans (Arabic: الليبيون الأمريكيون, romanized: al-Lībīyūn al-Amirīkīyūn) are United States citizens of Libyan descent or Libyan citizens who also have United States (US) citizenship.

Most Libyan Americans speak Arabic and English. According to the 2020 Census there were 13,681 Americans who claimed Libyan ancestry.

Some Libyan American associations are the Libyan American Organization, Libyan American Friendship Association (LAFA), Libyan American Association in Southern California and Libyan American Association of Georgia.

The Libyan American Organization have as goal the Libya defense, promote political awareness among its members and integrate to all community in the association. In addition, the organization wants to improve education, health care and infrastructure of Libya. The association hopes to have the community support in order to "rebuilding our beloved country".

Libyan American Friendship Association (LAFA) have as goal promote friendship between the Libyan and U.S., making dialogue the two peoples by holding international meetings and symposia, for the creation of programs and projects that help both peoples to establish ties. The organization celebrates coordinate visits between institutions of "economic, social, scientific and national / civil joint".

== Notable people ==
- Saddeka Arebi (d. 2007), social anthropologist, author
- Don Coscarelli (b. 1954), film director, producer, screenwriter
- Sadeg Faris, engineer, entrepreneur
- Fadwa El Gallal, journalist
- Mohamed Hrezi (b. 1991), marathon runner
- Khaled Mattawa (b. 1964), poet
- Esam Omeish (b. 1967), surgeon
- Noor Tagouri (b. 1993), journalist, activist, motivational speaker
- Khalifa Haftar (b. 1943), general, commander of the Libyan National Army

== See also ==
- Libya–United States relations
- Arab Americans
- Berber Americans
- North Africans in the United States
- Libyan Canadians
