= Moroccan Americans =

Americans of Moroccan birth or descent

Total population
- By ancestry or ethnic origin (2020 US Census): 147,528

Regions with significant populations
- New York City, Washington D.C., Boston, Florida (Jacksonville, Miami), Texas, California, Virginia

Languages
- Moroccan Arabic; Berber; American English; French; Spanish

Religion
- Majority: Sunni Islam, Judaism, Christianity (Protestantism, Catholicism, Atheism, Irreligion and other denominations).

Related ethnic groups
- Americans, Canadians

Moroccan Americans (Arabic: المغاربة في الولايات المتحدة, romanized: al-Maghāribah fī al-Wilāyāt al-Muttaḥidah) are Americans citizens who are of Moroccan descent, either fully or partially. It is also applied to Americans who hold dual citizenship in the United States and Morocco.

== History of immigration ==
Moroccan presence in the United States was rare until the mid-twentieth century. The first North African who came to the current United States was probably Estebanico Al Azemmouri (also called Estevanico), a Muslim Moroccan of Gnawa descent, who participated in Pánfilo de Narváez's ill-fated expedition to colonize Florida and the Gulf Coast in 1527. Only Azemmouri and three of his comrades survived during the eleven year, 5,000 mile journey from Florida to Texas. In 1534, Azemmouri crossed the southern United States to Arizona, accompanying Marcos de Niza as a guide in his search of the fabled Seven Cities of Cibola ahead of Coronado. Azemmouri was the first explorer to enter a Native American village.

The first American Jew to serve in the Senate was David Levy Yulee, who was of Moroccan descent and served as Florida's first Senator from 1845 to 1851 and again 1855–1861.

It is also possible that some South American descendants of Moroccan Jews emigrated to the U.S. in the early twentieth century, after the decline of the rubber industry in South America in 1910, to which their families had been dedicated for generations. After World War II, some groups of Jews from Morocco emigrated to the United States, fleeing poverty in North Africa. Most of them settled in previously established Sephardic Jewish communities from Spain, Turkey, or the Balkans. After Moroccan independence in 1956, many of their best young researchers left to study at American universities, joining scientific faculties. Muslim Moroccans, however, did not arrive to the United States in significant numbers until the late 1970s.

During the 1980s and 1990s, many Moroccans entered the United States to attend colleges, universities, graduate schools, and medical schools. Some Moroccans emigrated to United States seeking work, opening small retail stores and restaurants.

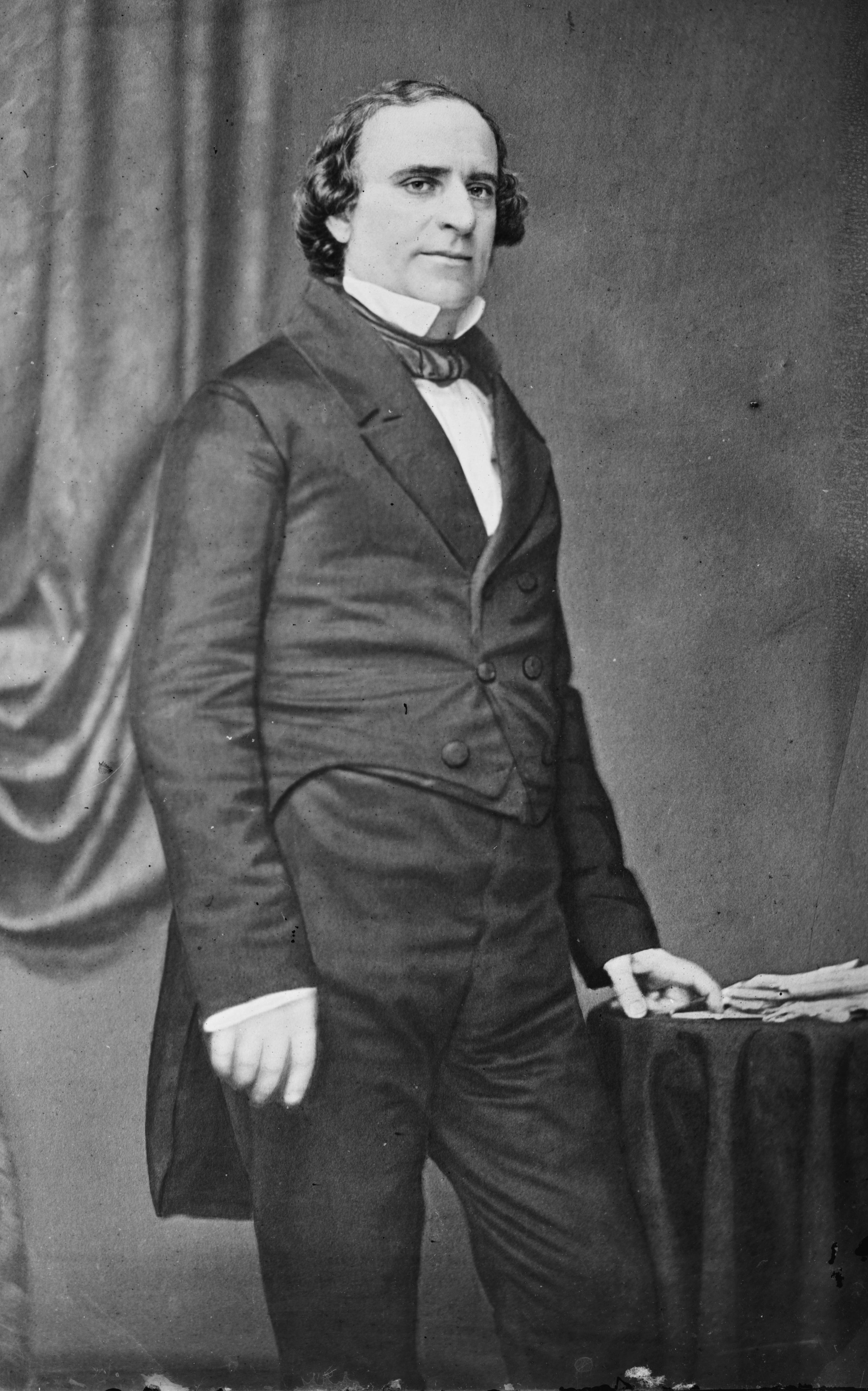
David Levy Yulee, US Senator of Moroccan-Jewish descent

In 1990 there were about 15,000 Moroccan Americans, with most of them being in New York City.

== Statistics ==
As of the 2000 U.S. census 38,923 Americans stated they were of Moroccan descent. About half of Moroccan immigrants arrived during or after 2000, a higher proportion than is found among U.S. immigrants overall, and the majority are U.S. citizens. As of 2009, 27,000 Moroccans (about 70% of the entire Moroccan American community) had immigrated between 1992 and 2002, with most of the Moroccan Americans living in large urban areas. By 2015, there were approximately 84,000 Moroccan immigrants and their children (first and second generations) living in the United States. These numbers, however, are very approximate: surveys and censuses regularly leave out representatives of ethnic and/religious minorities who, for various reasons, prefer not to be identified with the country of their origin.

By state, most Moroccan immigrants reside in New York, Florida, and Massachusetts. Each of these states have between 5,000 and 10,000 Moroccan immigrant residents. The New York City metro area has the largest population of Moroccan immigrants, with approximately 11,000. Other metro areas with large Moroccan immigrant populations are Boston, Washington DC, Los Angeles, Miami, Orlando, Chicago, Philadelphia, Houston, and Tampa.

== Religion ==
The vast majority of Moroccan Americans practice Islam. Most Moroccans are Sunni Muslims of the Maliki madh'hab.

Moroccans in New York City established the Islamic Mission of America for the Propagation of Islam and Defense of the Faith and the Faithful, the second mosque in New York.

A large minority of Moroccans identify with Judaism, specifically Sephardic Judaism.

== Media of Moroccan Americans ==
Tingis is a Moroccan American magazine which highlights cultural concerns, ideas, and issues of Moroccan Americans. It works against prejudice and cultural divisions, building and expanding bridges between the U.S. and Morocco.

== Organizations ==
There are some important organizations created mainly by Moroccans (and Algerians) Americans in Chicago, whose function is to help newly arrived immigrants to the United States. These arose in the 1990s. Of these organizations must be emphasized the Assembly of the Maghreb. This assembly has tried to help new immigrants from North Africa to adapt to American life and maintain, in turn, the principles of Sunni Islam. Because most North African immigrants in Chicago have not been associated closely with the Muslim Middle East, the North Africans come together as a common community. Often, in relation to the area of the mosque, the organization has taught job skills, English language, the importance of Sirat al-Mustaqim and moderation, among other things. Have been trained women to balance paid work with traditional household chores. Religious activities, such as collective prayer and the feasts of Ramadan, have been important in unifying Moroccans and other North African Muslim groups in Chicago.

Other Moroccan American associations are: the Moroccan American Community Organization (that establishes respect and knowledge of Moroccan culture), The Moroccan American House Association, Association of Moroccan Professionals in America (AMPA), Moroccan American Association of Northern California (MAANC, a non-profit organization that helps families of Moroccan origin living in Southern California in the areas economical, psychological and cultural adjustment, improving the quality of services to Moroccan immigrants, fast integration, and establish educational and cultural programs to try to keep the Moroccan culture in the community), Washington Moroccan Association (WAMA, localized in Seattle - Tacoma Metropolitan are establishing ties between Morocco and the United States, increased understanding of Moroccan culture and history of the community, charitable, educational and civic organizations on behalf of their members and build relationships with other organizations with similar functions, in the Arab community of Washington state) and Moroccan Society of Houston (Moroccan USA association NGO- its main goal is coordina social, cultural, and sport activities to maintain and strengthen the community's cultural heritage, and to "enhance mutual understanding" with other communities. In addition, they have a scholarship fund to help students with their college education expenses).

== Notable people ==
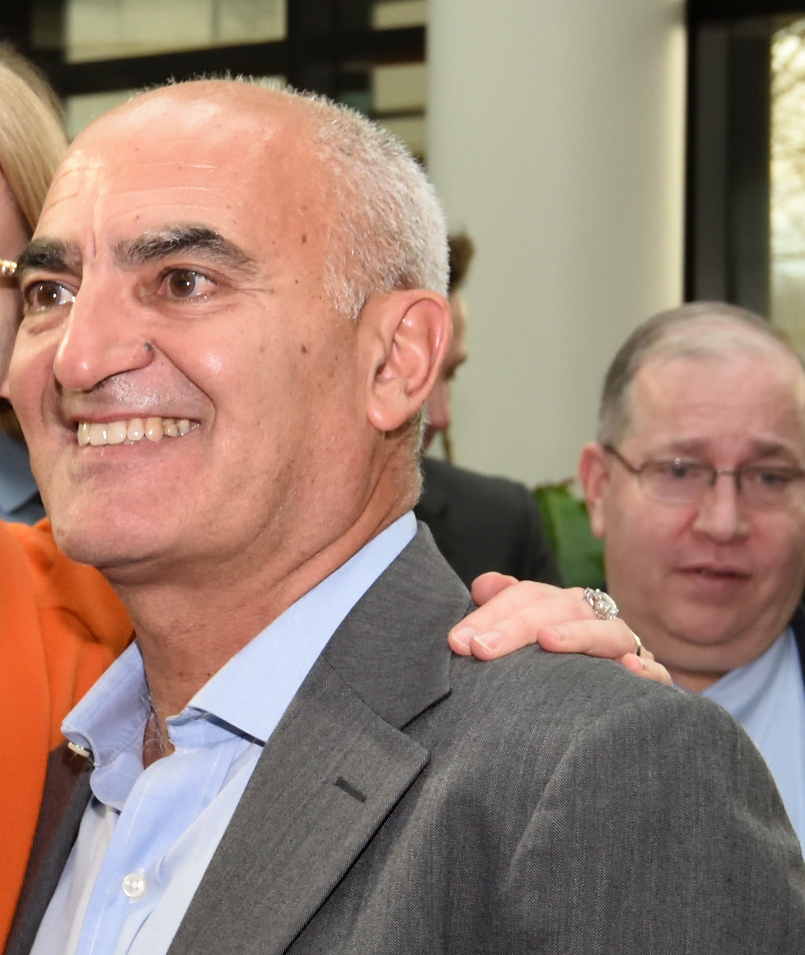
Moncef Slaoui, American researcher and former head of GlaxoSmithKline's vaccines department.

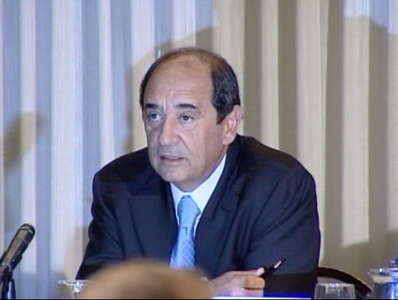
Alain J. P. Belda, Moroccan-born American businessman

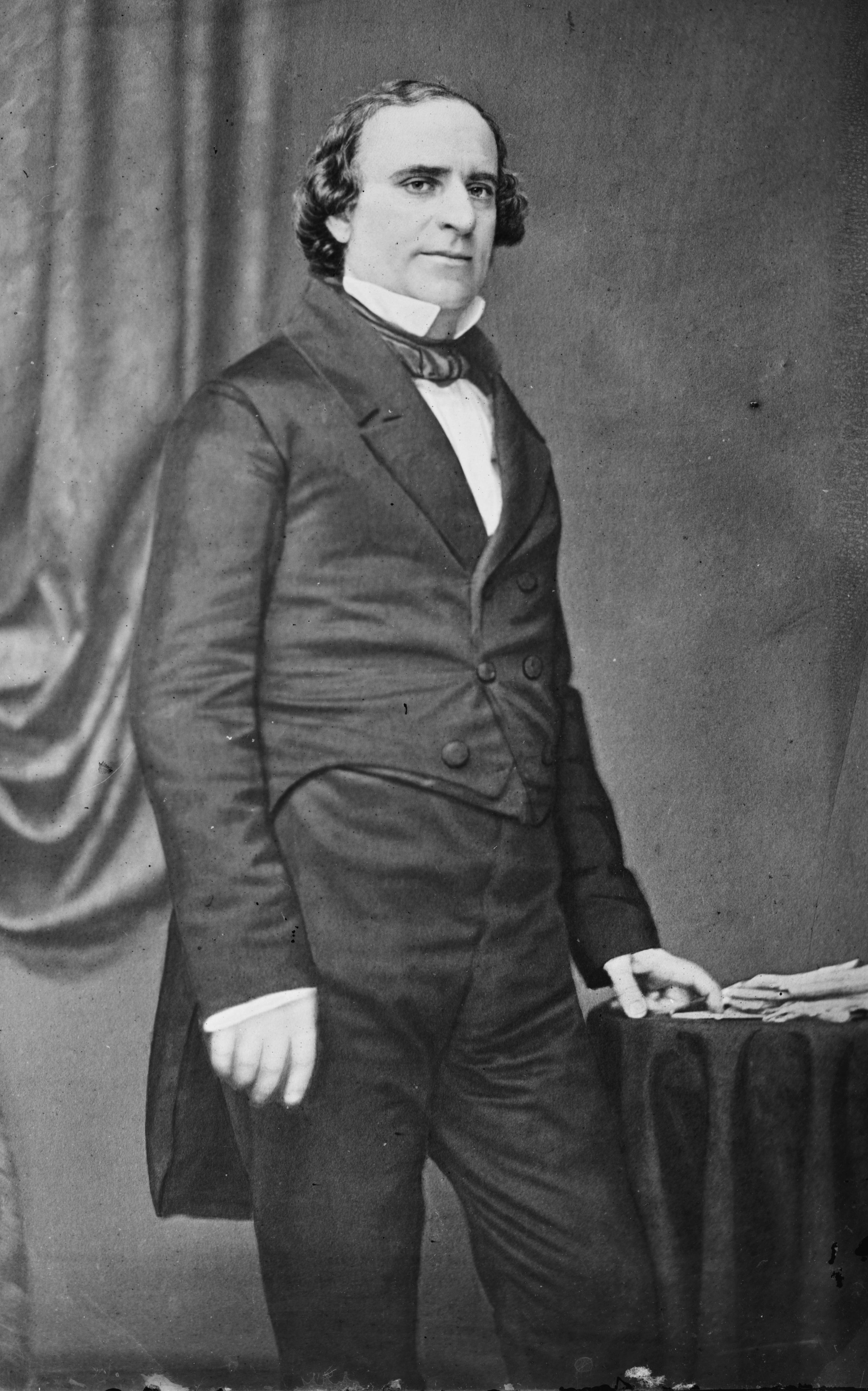
David Levy Yulee, The first American Jew to serve in the Senate was David Levy Yulee, who was Florida's first Senator, serving 1845–1851 and again 1855–1861.

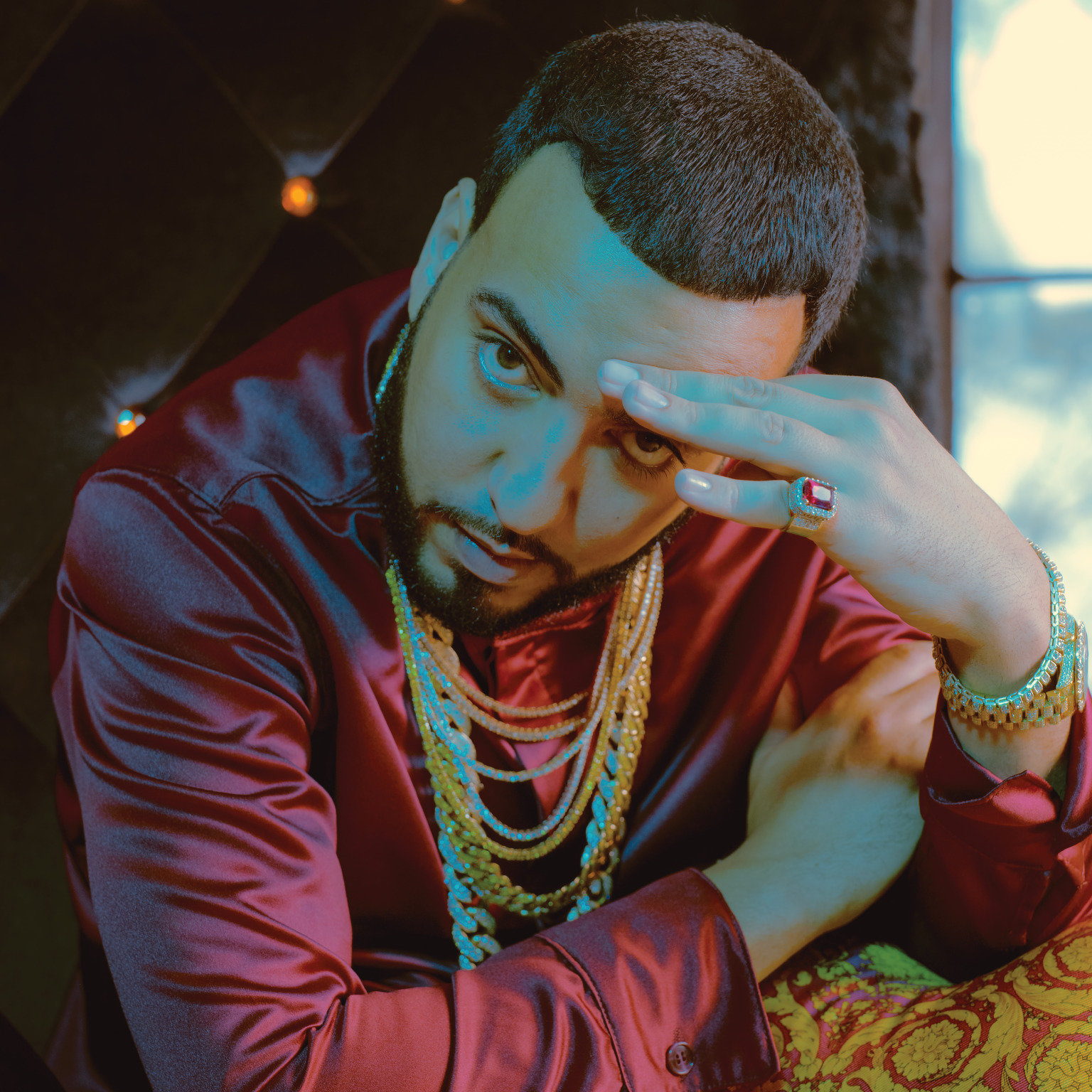
French Montana, Moroccan-born American rapper

- Moncef Slaoui, American-Moroccan researcher and former head of GlaxoSmithKline's vaccines department
- Noah Schnapp, Canadian-American actor of Moroccan Jewish descent
- Madison Beer, American singer-songwriter, her mother is of Moroccan Jewish descent
- Alain J. P. Belda, American businessman that has been a Managing Director of Warburg Pincus since 2009. Previously he was the Chairman of the Board of Alcoa from January 2001; he was Chief Executive Officer from January 2001 until May 2008
- Bibi Bourelly, singer-songwriter (Half Moroccan through maternal side)
- Paul Marciano, American fashion designer, businessman, investor, and philanthropist, co-founder of Guess Inc
- Sanaa Hamri, Moroccan-American film, television, and music video director
- Kenza Tazi, Moroccan alpine skier
- John Fritchey, former Democratic Cook County Commissioner of the Cook County Board of Commissioners who represented the 12th district in Chicago from 2010 until 2018 and was a Democratic State Representative in the Illinois House of Representatives.
- Baruj Benacerraf, American immunologist, of Moroccan Jewish descent who shared the 1980 Nobel Prize in Physiology or Medicine for the "discovery of the major histocompatibility complex genes.
- Marc Lasry, American of Moroccan descent and hedge fund manager of Avenue Capital Group
- Sonia Gardner, American of Moroccan descent and co-founder of Avenue Capital Group
- Driss R. Temsamani, Moroccan-American banker. He is the Head of Digital for the Americas at Citigroup. He is also a public speaker in Fintech, author, and diaspora advocate.
- Dalya Attar, American politician who currently serves in the Maryland House of Delegates; represents the 41st Legislative District of the state of Maryland, which is located in northwest Baltimore City
- Modar Alaoui, Moroccan-American serial entrepreneur mostly known for his work in the field of Artificial Intelligence and Computer Vision-based face analytics and emotion recognition technologies; founder and CEO of Eyeris Technologies, Inc.
- Shiri Appleby, American actress and director of Moroccan Jewish descent on her mother's side
- Aicha Elbasri, writer and former United Nations official. She is the author of L’Imaginaire carcéral de Jean Genet, a book on Jean Genet, a prominent, controversial French writer and later political activist. She was previously the Spokesperson for the African Union – United Nations hybrid peacekeeping mission in Darfur, UNAMID.
- Joseph Chetrit, American of Moroccan descent and real estate investor and developer
- Moses Bensusan, Canadian-American real estate developer, he is the CEO of Liberty Grande, LLC a real estate development company and CEO/President of Logictech Construction Group
- RedOne, American Moroccan music producer
- Hassan Hakmoun, American Moroccan Gnawa master musician
- David Levy Yulee, American politician of Moroccan Sephardi descent
- French Montana, Moroccan-American rapper born in Morocco
- Richard Wolffe, British-American journalist, MSNBC commentator, and author
- Frank Mir, MMA fighter, former UFC Heavyweight Champion. Born to a Cuban-born father of Moroccan heritage
- Layla El, English American dancer, model, and WWE professional wrestler, of Moroccan descent
- Emmanuelle Chriqui, Canadian American actress of Moroccan Jewish descent
- Ismail Elfath, Moroccan born, MLS and FIFA-listed football referee. Naturalized as U.S. citizen in 2022.
- Driss Sekkat, television producer
- Youssef Zalal, MMA fighter, Moroccan born, moved to the United States as a teen, based out of Colorado

== See also ==
- North Africans in the United States
- Berber Americans
- Arab Americans
- Morocco–United States relations
