= Algerian Americans =

Total population
- By ancestry or ethnic origin (2020 US Census); 38,186

Regions with significant populations
- New York, Boston, Chicago, Dallas, Los Angeles, Atlanta

Languages
- Berber; American English; French; Algerian Arabic

Religion
- Majority: Islam; Minority: Judaism, Christianity

Algerian Americans (Arabic: أمريكيون جزائريون) are Americans who are of Algerian descent or Algerians who have American citizenship. According to the 2020 United States census, there are over 38,000 Americans of Algerian descent.

Algerian communities are established in major cities such as New York, Washington, D.C., Los Angeles and Chicago. Algerians in Chicago commemorate the anniversary of the start of the war between Algeria and France that led to their country's independence every November 1.

== See also ==
- North Africans in the United States
- Arab Americans
- Algeria–United States relations
- Mohamed Bahi (born 1983/1984), American-Algerian former Chief Liaison of New York City Mayor Eric Adams to the Muslim community.
