= Egyptian Americans =

Americans of Egyptian birth or descent

الأمريكان المصريين
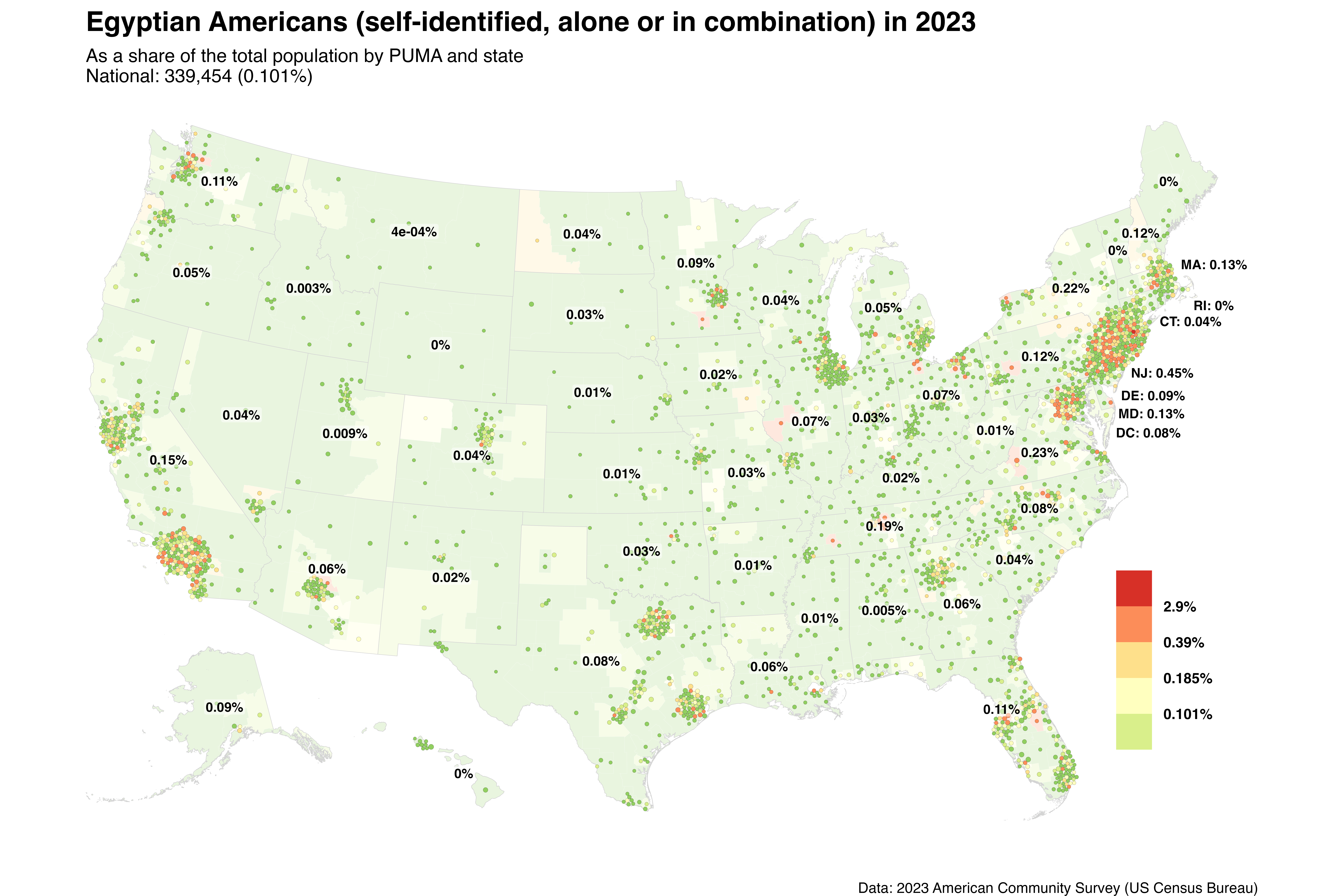

Total population
- 1,000,000-1,500,000

Regions with significant populations
- Northern New Jersey and the New York metropolitan area; as well as California (especially in Los Angeles, Riverside and San Francisco), Minnesota, Washington, Colorado, Massachusetts, Pennsylvania, Connecticut, Rhode Island, Illinois, Wisconsin, Ohio, Michigan, Washington, D.C., Virginia, Georgia, Florida, Tennessee, and Texas (especially Dallas-Fort Worth and Houston)

Languages
- Egyptian Arabic, American English

Religion
- Christianity (Orthodoxy, Catholicism, Protestantism); Islam (Sunni, Sufism)

Related ethnic groups
- North African Americans, Coptic Americans

Egyptian Americans (Egyptian Arabic: الأمريكان المصريين, romanized: el-Amrīkān el-Maṣrīyyīn) are Americans of partial or full Egyptian ancestry. The 2016 US Census estimated the number of people with Egyptian ancestry at 256,000, Egyptian Americans may also include the Egyptian foreign-born population in the United States. The US Census Bureau estimated in 2016 that there were 181,677 foreign-born Egyptians in the United States. They represented around 0.4% of the total US foreign-born population as 42,194,354 first-generation immigrants in 2016. Egyptians are concentrated in New York City and Los Angeles. California has the largest Egyptian population by state.

== History ==
Egyptians began to migrate to the U.S. in significant numbers in the second half of the twentieth century. The majority of Egyptians left their country for economic or educational reasons. However, many emigrated because they were concerned about the political developments that were occurring in Egypt after the Egyptian Revolution of 1952. Thousands of Egyptians, mainly Copts, left Egypt in 1967 after its defeat in the Six-Day War of 1967. From 1967 to 1977, more than 15,000 Egyptians immigrated to the United States alone. Since the 1981 assassination of Anwar Sadat and consequential inauguration of Hosni Mubarak as the President, the Egyptian economy has endured three decades of economic stagnation that has prompted a significant number of Egyptians to emigrate to more prosperous countries, such as the United States. Attracted by the higher standards of living and greater civil liberties, Egyptian expatriates have traditionally favoured permanent residence in countries such as the United States, and Canada, but sizeable numbers are also present in Australia, Italy, the United Kingdom, France, and Gulf states. The first wave of Egyptian immigrants to the United States were mostly educated professionals and skilled workers. Egyptian immigration to the United States was further eased by the 1965 Immigration and Nationality Act, which allowed selective entry of certain professionals, especially scientists, from countries such as Egypt, which was up until then subjected to stringent emigration restrictions. As a result, most Egyptian Americans, especially first and second generation Egyptians, have in comparison, become generally very well educated relative to the American population as a whole.

== Demographics ==
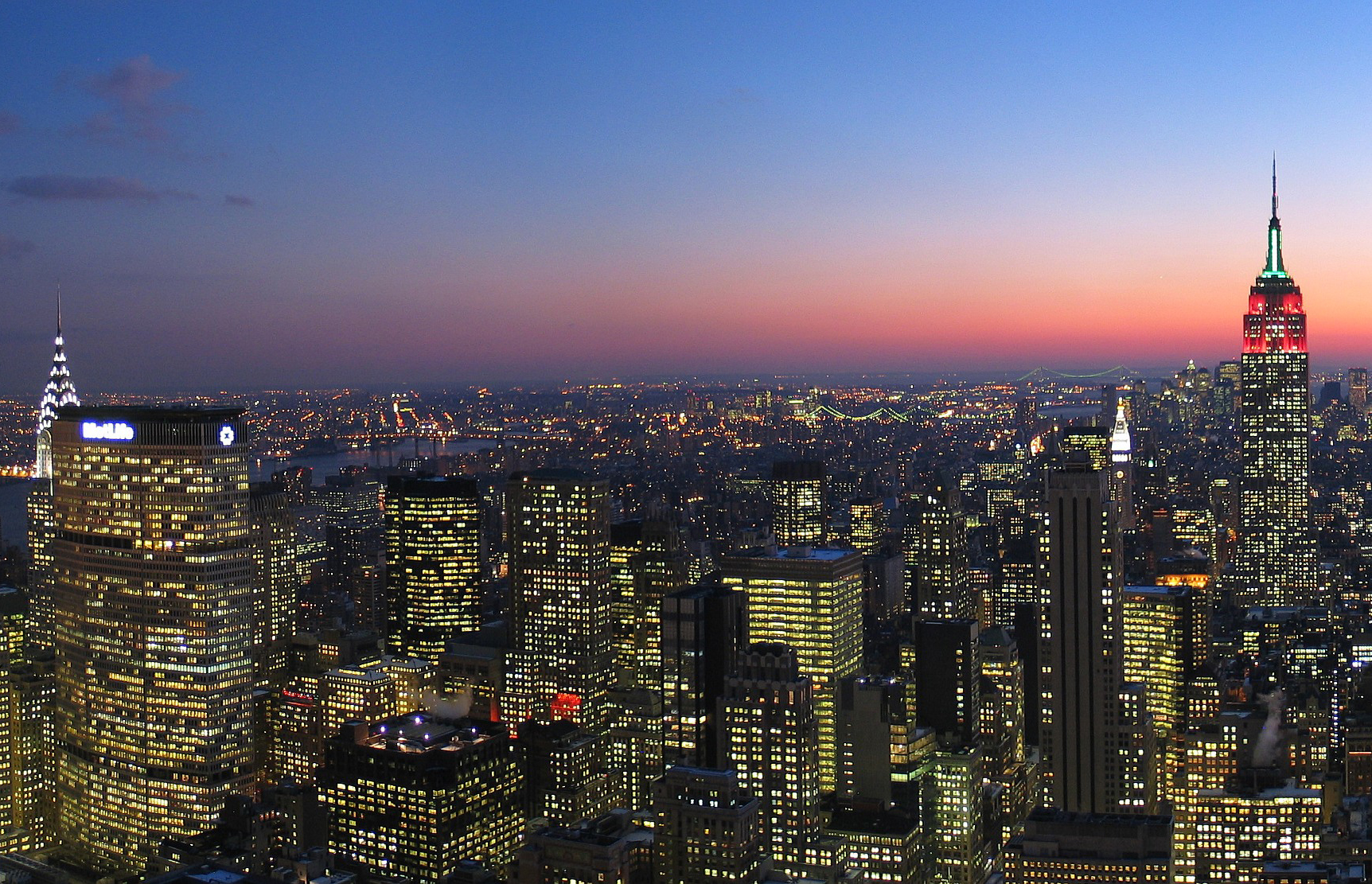
The New York metropolitan area, including Northern New Jersey and New York City, is home to by far the largest Egyptian population in the United States.

As of 2012, there were 143,085 Egyptian-born residents in the United States. In 2016, there were 181,677 foreign-born Egyptians in the United States according to the US Census Bureau's 2016 estimates.

The Arab American Institute indicates that Egyptians are among the larger Arab American populations in the country. Considering the foreign-born population in 2016, Egyptian immigrants represented the second largest group of the Arab foreign-born population in the United States. They followed the Iraqis who accounted for 221,587 foreign-born individuals. After the Iraqi and Egyptian foreign-born populations, the Lebanese foreign-born population in the United States represented 128,608 first-generation immigrants in 2016. Although the Lebanese foreign-born population was the leading Arab immigrant population in the US from 1960 till the 1990s, the Egyptian foreign-born population took the lead at the start of the millennium increasing in more than ten times its size of 1960.

According to US Census Bureau data, around 123,489 people self-reported Egyptian ancestry alone and a further 19,343 people self-reported Egyptian ancestry in combination with another ancestry. Following consultations with MENA organizations, the Census Bureau also announced in 2014 that it would offer a new MENA ethnic option for populations from the Middle East, North Africa and the Arab world.

Most Egyptians in the United States live in the New York City–Northern New Jersey–Long Island area (39,020). The next largest concentrations of Egyptians are in Los Angeles–Long Beach–Santa Ana (19,170), Washington, D.C.–Arlington–Alexandria (5,770), Nashville–Davidson–Murfreesboro–Franklin (3,865), Chicago–Joliet–Naperville (3,705), Riverside–San Bernardino–Ontario (3,630), Miami–Fort Lauderdale–Pompano Beach (3,625), Philadelphia–Camden–Wilmington (3,280), Houston–Sugar Land–Baytown (2,820), San Francisco–Oakland–Fremont (2,745), and other areas (55,455). There is also a significant Egyptian community in the Detroit metropolitan area especially around Dearborn.

While Egyptians tend to concentrate among other larger populations of Arab Americans, they represent the majority of Arabs in certain counties, including most of greater New York City, Dallas, the Inland Empire, the Susquehanna Valley, nearly all of New Jersey, and greater Nashville.

== Predominant means of entry ==
In the total foreign-born Egyptian population of 2016, 67% were naturalized US citizens. A majority of 32% of foreign-born Egyptians in 2016 gained legal permanent resident (LPR) status as immediate relatives of US citizens, the primary means of entry for most US foreign-born populations. Therefore, social networks through familial ties remain the primary means of entry for Egyptians obtaining LPR status, nonetheless, almost as many, precisely 29%, enter through Section 203(c) of the Immigration and Nationality Act of 1990.

In 2016, the third major channel of obtaining LPR status in the US for Egyptian first-generation immigrants were as refugees and asylees. The share of the Egyptian foreign-born population obtaining LPR status as refugees or asylees was at 23% in 2016. These figures were particularly high following the 2011 uprisings and post-revolutionary period in Egypt. Specifically, 2,571 foreign-born Egyptians were affirmatively granted asylum status in 2012 compared to 751 in 2011. Nevertheless, these numbers decreased to 690 affirmative asylum status in 2016.

== Religion ==
In contrast to the population of Egypt, where Muslims constitute approximately 90% of the population, a larger percentage of Egyptian Americans are Coptic Christians.

== Socioeconomic status ==
The first immigrants of Egypt that arrived in United States were mainly university graduates, and some Egyptians who had come seeking further education. Among these immigrants were doctors, accountants, engineers, lawyers and even teachers from major universities. The second wave had university degrees, but had to accept menial jobs (many of them drove taxicabs, or waited on tables in restaurants). Some citizens even became entrepreneurs.

The Egyptian foreign-born population in the US is characterized by a relatively high educational status and professional attainment in comparison to the total US population.

In 2016, Egyptian first-generation immigrants were more than twice as likely to have a bachelor's degree in comparison to the total US population and 20% received a graduate or professional degree versus 12.3% of the US population. This high level of educational attainment may be part of a wider phenomenon of skilled Egyptian migration to the US. In other words, the high rates of unemployment for educated young people in Egypt versus the educational and professional opportunities in the US make immigration an appealing alternative. This is especially true in periods of political uncertainty like the 1970s or following the 2011 uprisings in Egypt. Furthermore, since many Egyptian immigrants enter the US through the Diversity Immigrant Visa Program which requires a certain educational level, it is understandable that immigration policies have also pushed the more educated Egyptians to migrate to the US.

Concerning occupational differences, the Egyptian foreign-born population and the American populace do not showcase startling divergences. Yet in 2016 estimates by the US Census Bureau, both groups tended to contrast at the more extreme ends of the professional market. Indeed, Egyptian first-generation immigrants in 2016 outnumbered the US population in the management, business, science and arts occupations. Nearly 50% of the Egyptian foreign-born population was employed in these occupations whereas 37% of the US population was represented in these sectors. On the other hand, the share of Egyptian immigrants in the natural resources, construction and maintenance occupations represented under 4% of the Egyptian foreign-born population while almost 9% of the American population appeared in this sector.

== Relations with Egypt ==
In 2001, Universal Union of Egyptian Expatriates was created in order to help Egyptian Expatriates. Today, more than 6 million Egyptians live, work and study abroad are connected. A fair percentage of Egyptian Expatriates settled in the US. Almost 70–75% of Egyptian Expatriates holding the membership of the UUEE are Muslims and 25–30% are Coptic.

On February 11, 2012, a coalition of American Egyptians from around the United States launched a new advocacy organization, the American Egyptian Strategic Alliance.

== Notable people ==
- Mohamed M. Atalla
- Nessa Diab
- Mohamed A. El-Erian
- Stephen Adly Guirgis
- Maryana Iskander
- Hoda Kotb
- Rami Malek
- Wendie Malick
- Omar Metwally
- Michael Mina
- Tarek Morad
- Abdel Nader
- Dina Powell
- Raef
- Kareem Rahma
- Abdul El-Sayed
- Minouche Shafik
- Adam Shoemaker
- Amanda Sobhy
- Bassem Youssef
- Ramy Youssef
- Ahmed Zewail

== See also ==
- Arab Americans
- Coptic Americans
- Copts
- Coptic Orthodox Church in the United States
- List of Coptic Orthodox churches in the United States
- North Africans in the United States
- Egyptian Canadians
- Egyptian Australians
- Egypt–United States relations
