= Maghreb Association of North America =

The Maghreb Association of North America (MANA), also called Assembly of the Maghreb, is a North African-American non-profit organization based in Chicago founded in 1989. The goal of the organization is to help new immigrants from Maghreb adapt to American life and maintain, in turn, the principles of Sunni Islam. The organization was founded by Moroccan and Algerian immigrants and meets to Moroccans, Algerians, Libyans and Tunisian people living in Chicago area. The Assembly connected to Maghrebis people of different economic conditions.

Because most Maghrebi immigrants in Chicago have not been associated closely with the Muslim Middle East, the Maghrebis come together as a common community. Often, in relation to the area of the mosque, the organization has taught job skills, English language, the importance of Sirat al-Mustaqim and moderation, among other things. Have been trained women to balance paid work with traditional household chores. In addition, the Assembly meeting new people arriving at O'Hare airport, and deliver them employment, housing, and schools, and teach them to use and manage the computer. Immigrants also have a mosque at the corner of Elston and Montrose Avenue. Also religious activities such as collective prayer and the feasts of Ramadan have an important role in the assembly.

== See also ==
- North Africans in the United States
