= Mauritanian Americans =

Americans of Mauritanian birth or descent

Total population
- est. 5,000

Regions with significant populations
- Ohio (Cincinnati and Columbus), Erlanger (Kentucky), New York City

Languages
- Hassaniya Arabic, Pulaar, Wolof, Soninke, French, American English

Religion
- Predominantly Islam, minority Christianity, Atheism, other

Mauritanian Americans are Americans of Mauritanian descent or Mauritanians who have American citizenship. The Mauritanian diaspora in the United States is relatively small compared to other African immigrant groups but has grown since the 1980s due to political instability, ethnic tensions, and economic hardship in Mauritania. According to answers provided to an open-ended question included in the 2000 US census, 993 people said that their ancestry or ethnic origin was Mauritanian. According to a 2012 published report, however, about 4,000 people of Mauritanian origin live in the Cincinnati (Ohio) and Erlanger (Kentucky) areas and another 1,065 Mauritanians live in Columbus, Ohio.

== Demography ==
=== Reasons for Migration ===
Most Mauritanians in the United States arrived as refugees or asylum seekers, particularly during the late 1980s and 1990s. Key factors contributing to emigration include: Ethnic conflict, slavery and post-slavery discrimination, political repression and economic hardship.

By the late 2000s and early 2010s, family reunification and secondary migration within the U.S. also contributed to population growth. There are Mauritanian immigrant communities in several parts of United States, such as Brooklyn, New York, and Memphis, Tennessee, but at least one-third of the people of Mauritanian origin resides in Ohio (mostly in Cincinnati and Columbus) and Erlanger, Kentucky. Some of them were historically enslaved Blacks (Haratin) or they were White Moors. Some of the White Moors who settled in the Cincinnati area had clashed with the Mauritanian government, either because they supported a failed candidate for president or because their families spoke out against government policies, including slavery. Some "Afro-Mauritanians", who have a darker skin but were never enslaved, are also present in the United States. The White Moors and Black Moors speak dialects of Arabic, while the Afro-Mauritanians speak African languages.

Mauritanian Americans have created several community associations in the United States, such as Mauritanian Community and Friendship in Erlanger, Kentucky (composed mostly of White Moors) and the Mauritanian Community Association of Ohio in Cincinnati (composed almost entirely of Afro-Mauritanians). The purpose of the latter organization is to help Mauritanian Americans "in many aspects: human, social and cultural". Its future plans include assisting Mauritanian refugees in Senegal and Mali and persons living in Mauritania.

== Religious Life ==
Mauritanian Americans are predominantly Muslim, following Sunni Islam and often maintaining ties to the Maliki tradition common in Mauritania. Religious life also intersects with community associations, particularly during Ramadan and major holidays.

== Notable people ==
- Ahmed Ould Sid'Ahmed
- Ahmedou Ould-Abdallah
- Nasser Weddady
- Mamoudou Athie

== See also ==
- Mauritania–United States relations
