= Tunisian Americans =

Americans of Tunisian birth or descent

Total population
- By ancestry or ethnic origin (2020 US Census); 15,270

Regions with significant populations
- California; Northeast; Southeast

Languages
- Berber; Arabic; Tunisian Arabic; American English; French

Religion
- Islam (Sunni); Christianity; Judaism

Tunisian Americans are Americans of Tunisian descent. Tunisia–United States relations date back more than 200 years.

== History ==
Prior to the arrival of Peace Corps and Amideast volunteers in the early-1960s and 1970s, there was little interest on the part of Tunisians to emigrate to the US. Many Tunisians, including Jews, immigrated when Tunisia was under French rule. In 1981, the U.S. launched its Technology Transfer Program in Tunisia with the goal of increasing Tunisia's long-term capacity to apply new technologies in support of the development of a market economy. The Technology Transfer Program aimed to accomplish this by developing a substantial cadre of individuals with the skills and attitudes needed to develop and sustain a competitive, open market system. USAID/Tunis to date has obligated $45 million under the Project, has dispersed all but about $3 million of that total. Through the TTP, young and intelligent Tunisians were granted the opportunity to pursue studies in the United States. By the late-1990s, the number of Tunisians in United States started to grow, reaching around 8,000 through the launch of the Diversity Immigrant Visa program.

== Building a Tunisian-American community ==
In 1998, the idea of building a Tunisian-American community was born; an impossible task, considering the dispersion of the community (basically diluted between the West Coast, Northeast and Southeast areas) and the size of the country. At that time, the Internet and high-tech telecommunications started to grow and evolve.

Over the years, in spite of always being seen through a "political lens", thanks to support from people of authority and many volunteers, the organization was able to inspire the formation of local chapters that operate autonomously, but carry out the mission of the organization by conducting community-based activities that raise the profile of Tunisia in the United States and promote cross-cultural literacy.

== Notable people ==
- Bruce Allen (American football) (of Tunisian Jewish descent)
- George Allen (American politician) (of Tunisian Jewish descent)
- Jennifer Allen (of Tunisian Jewish descent)
- Max Azria (of Tunisian Jewish descent)
- Aziza Baccouche
- M. Salah Baouendi
- Leila Ben Youssef
- Mounir Laroussi
- Miled Faiza
- Annissa Essaibi George
- Ben Guez
- Suleika Jaouad
- Colette Justine
- David Mazouz (of Tunisian Jewish descent)
- Anissa Naouai
- Ghaya Oliveira
- Nick Valensi (of Tunisian Jewish descent)
- Noël Wells

== See also ==
- Tunisia–United States relations
- North Africans in the United States
- Tunisian Canadians
