= Kenyan Americans =

Americans of Kenyan birth or descent

Wamarekani wa Kenya
Barack Obama

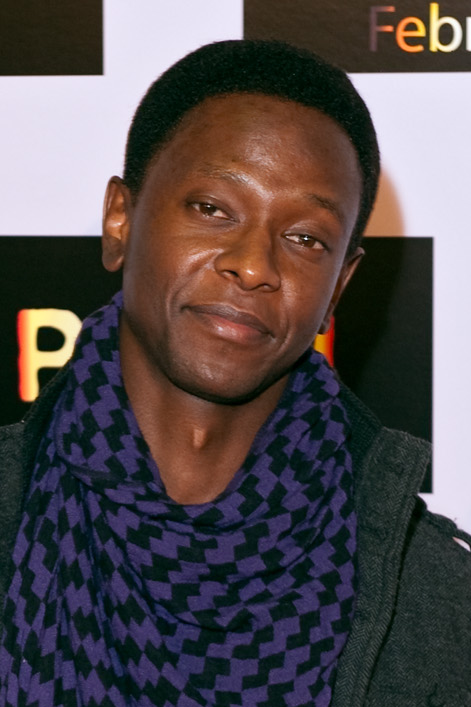
Edi Gathegi

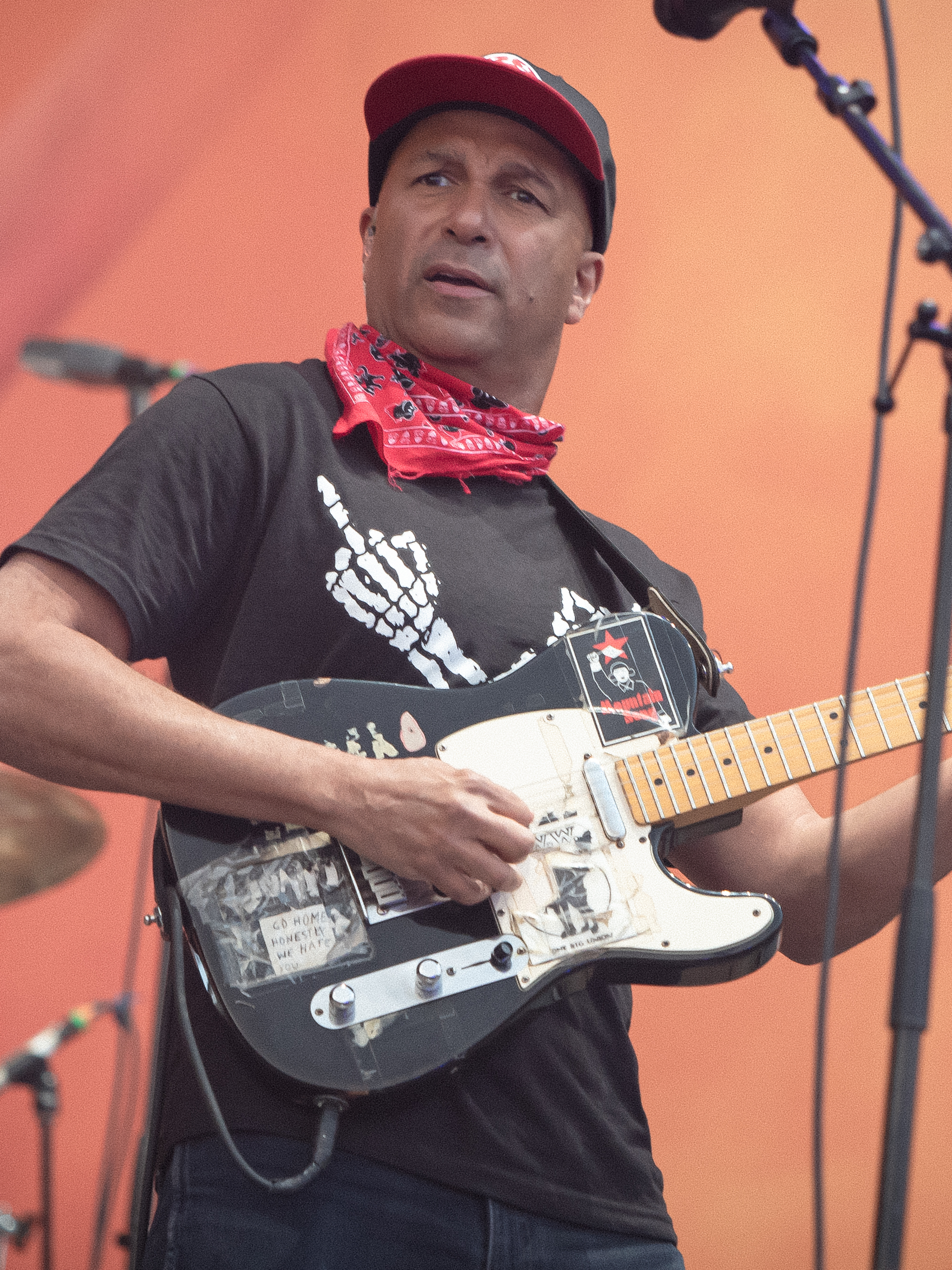
Tom Morello

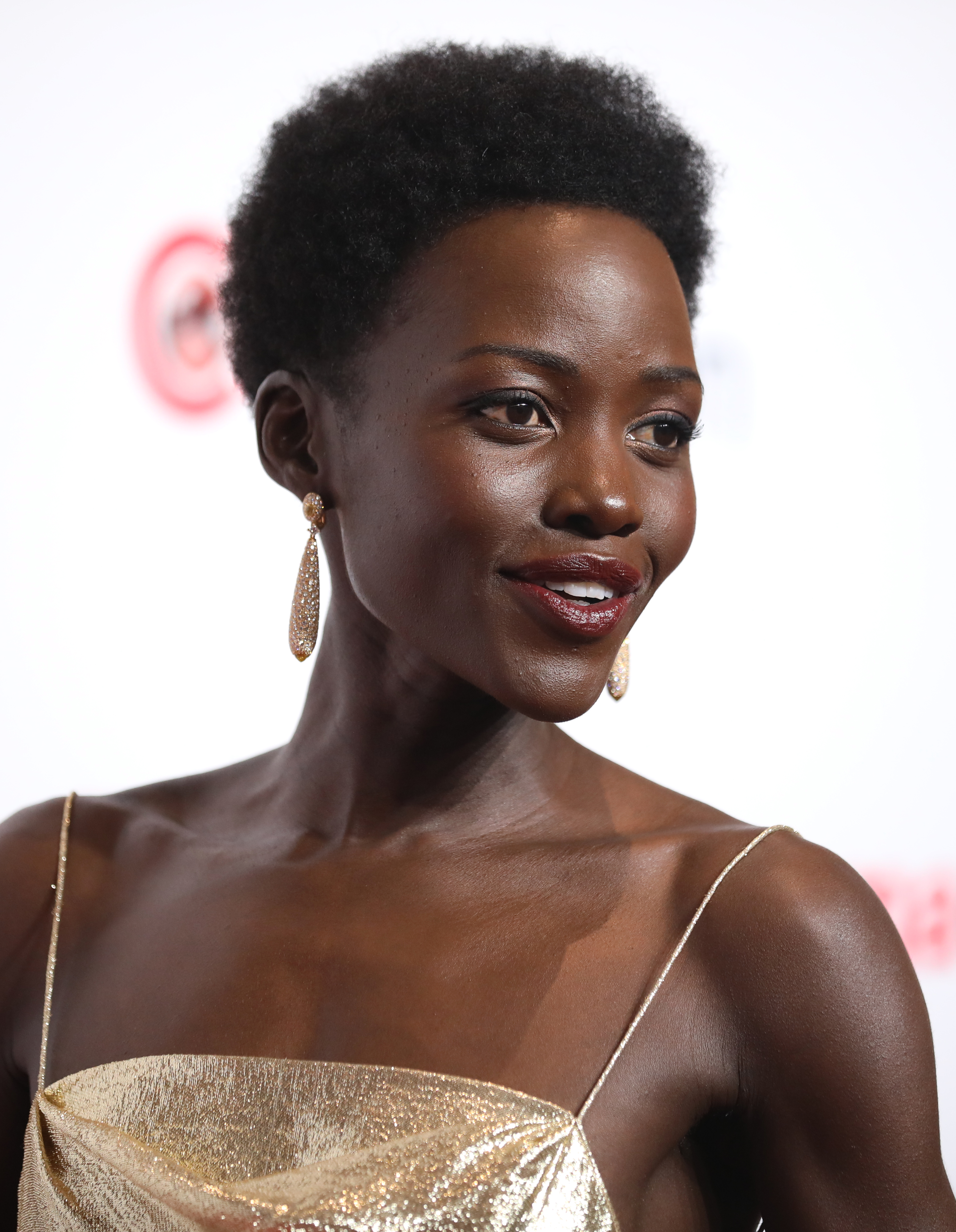
Lupita Nyong'o

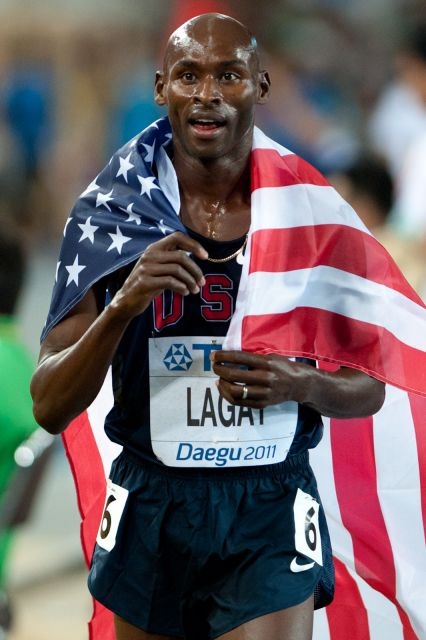
Bernard Lagat

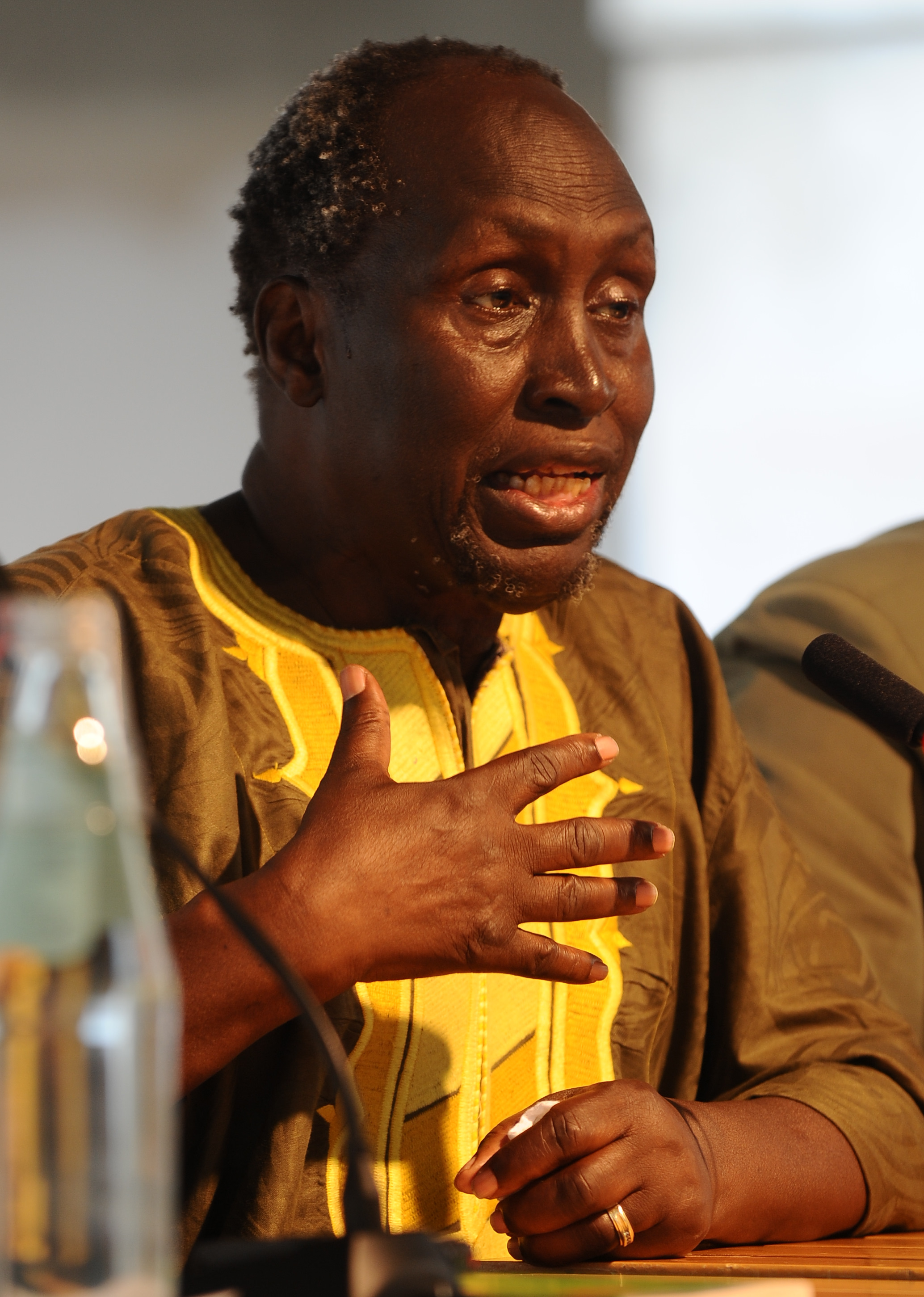
Ngũgĩ wa Thiong'o

Total population
- estimated 202,638

Regions with significant populations
- Los Angeles, San Diego, San Francisco Bay Area, Seattle metropolitan area, Denver, Texas, Minneapolis, Washington, D.C., New York, Boston, Philadelphia, Delaware, Maryland, North Carolina, Atlanta, Miami and Southern United States

Languages
- Swahili, English (Kenyan dialect)

Religion
- Roman Catholicism, Protestantism and Islam

Related ethnic groups
- Luo; Kikuyu; Meru; Swahili; Kamba; Maasai; Kalenjin; Kisii; Ugandan Americans; Tanzanian Americans

Kenyan Americans are an ethnic group of Americans of Kenyan descent and ancestry. As of the 2021 census, there were an estimated 94,623 Kenyan-born persons living in the United States. Most Kenyan Americans are concentrated in Minneapolis–St. Paul, Seattle, Texas, Maryland, Georgia, New York, North Carolina, and the greater Washington, D.C. area.

== History ==
The USA's subsequent restrictions against any form of immigrants from Africa and Asia until the latter half of the 20th century led to little voluntary immigration from Kenya. Kenyan emigration to the United States then noted a large increase, nearly doubling from the decades before.

This increase was caused by several factors such as political instability and a downturn in the economy of the 1980s in Kenya coupled with a high rate of unemployment (over 35%) led to a greater desire to immigrate to the USA. Some immigrants were also attracted to technology-oriented careers in the United States that boomed in availability in the 1990s and early 2000s.

== Demographics ==
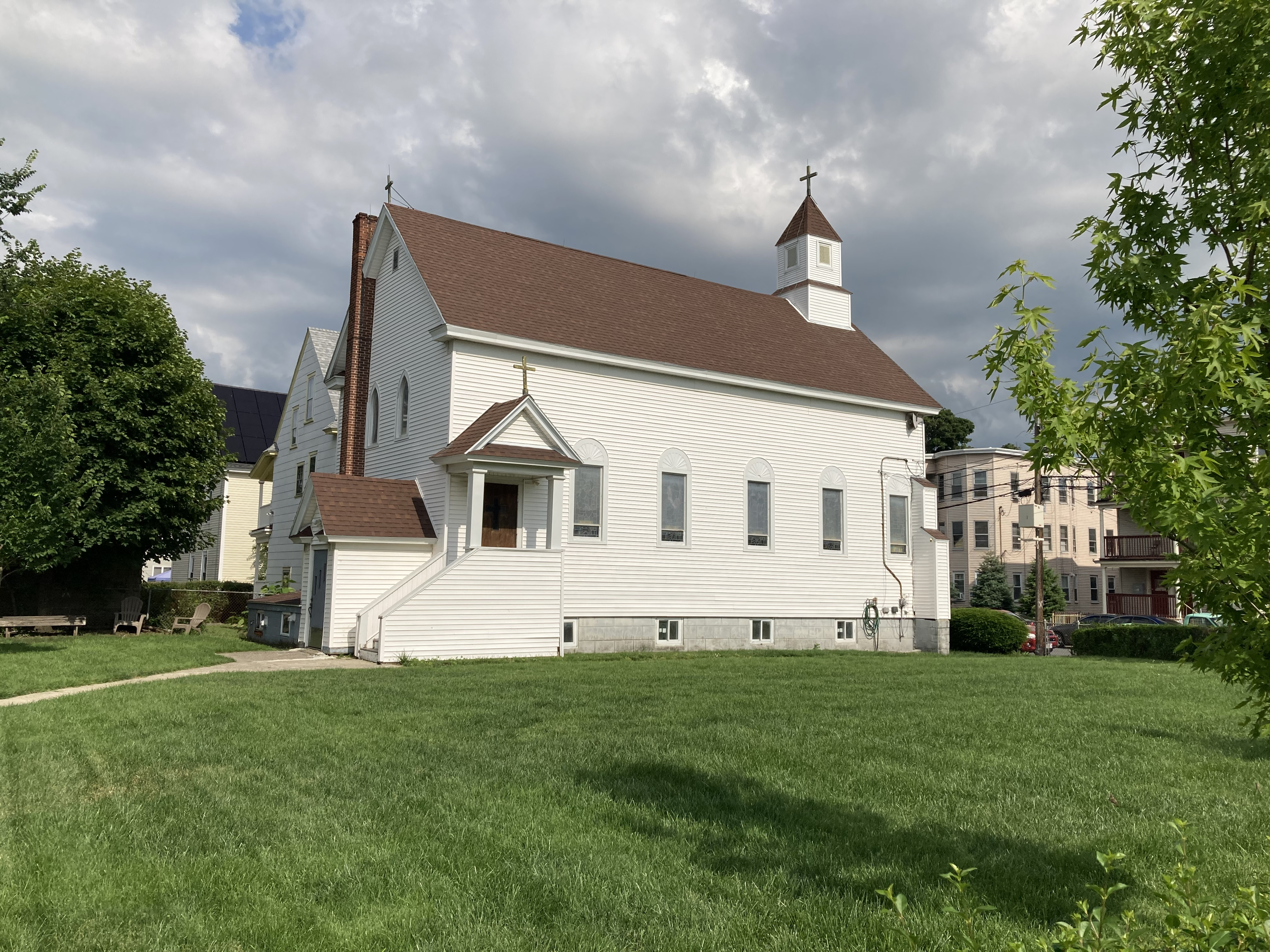
St. Paul's Kenyan Community Church in South Lawrence, Massachusetts. This church was founded in 1995 to meet the needs of African immigrants bought this building in Lawrence in 2007. It holds services in English and Kikuyu and is a member of the Anglican Church in North America’s Anglican Diocese in New England.

Kenyan Americans come from ethnic groups such as the Kikuyu, Kisii, Luhya, Maasai, Kamba, Kalenjin, Meru or Luo people.

The largest populations of Kenyans in the United States are found in Texas, Minnesota, Washington, Southern California, Massachusetts, and Maryland (including the greater Washington, D.C. area.) Many Kenyans are also established in Georgia and North Carolina, states with important health care centers.

According to the 2010 census, approximately one-third of persons born in Kenya who are living in the US have become naturalized citizens.

African immigrants are among the most educated groups in the United States. Like their recent immigrant counterparts Kenyan Americans give a high value to education.

According to estimates from the Migration Policy Institute for 2015 to 2019, the total number of immigrants from Kenya in the United States was 141,800. The top counties of settlement were as follows:

1) Hennepin County, MN – 6,900

2) King County, WA – 4,500

3) Tarrant County, TX – 4,400

4) Dallas County, TX – 3,700

5) Baltimore County, MD – 3,000

6) Harris County, TX – 2,900

7) Los Angeles County, CA – 2,500

8) Franklin County, OH – 2,500

9) Middlesex County, Mass.– 2,400

10) Collin County, TX – 2,400

11) Pierce County, WA – 2,200

12) Montgomery County, MD – 2,000

13) Cobb County, GA – 2,000

14) Ramsey County, MN – 1,900

15) New Castle County, DE – 1,900

16) Maricopa County, AZ – 1,800

17) Johnson County, KS – 1,800

From the same source for 2017–2021, there was a total of 150,900 Kenyan immigrants nationally, the top counties of settlement being:

1) King County, WA. – 6,800 – 1)

2) Hennepin, MN – 6,800 – (Down 1)

3) Tarrant County, TX – 5,100 – (Same)

4) Dallas County, TX – 3,700 – (Same)

5) Middlesex County, MA – 3,100 – (Up 4)

6) Franklin County, OH – 3,000 – (Up 2)

7) Pierce County, WA – 2,900 – (Up 4)

8) Los Angeles County, CA – 2,800 – (Down 1)

9) Harris County, TX – 2,800 – (Down 3)

10) Baltimore County, MD – 2,700 – 5)

11) Ramsey County, MN – 2,200 – (Up 3)

12) Wake County, NC – 2,100 – (New)

13) Maricopa County, AZ – 2,100 – (Up 3)

14) Johnson County, KS – 2,100 – (Up 3)

15) Collin County, TX – 2,100 – (Down 5)

16) Saint Louis County, MO – 1,900 – (New)

17) Montgomery County, MD – 1,900 – (Down 5)

18) Orange County, CA – 1,800

19) New Castle County, DE – 1,800 – (Down 4)

20) Worcester County, MA – 1,500

21) Fort Bend County, TX – 1,500

22) Fairfax County, VA – 1,500

23) Dakota County, MN – 1,500

24) Hudson County, NJ – 1,400

25) Gwinnett County, GA – 1,400

26) Essex County, NJ – 1,400

27) Denton County, TX – 1,400

28) Cobb County, GA – 1,400 – (Down 15)

29) Middlesex County, NJ – 1,200

30) Santa Clara County, California, and Cass County, North Dakota, each had 1,100 while Lehigh County, Pennsylvania, had 1,000.

== Organizations ==
Like other immigrant groups living in the US, Kenyan Americans have created many organizations. These include the Kenya Diaspora Advisory Council, the Kenya American Association, the Kenyan-Cincinnati Association ("kcaweb", whose goal is to facilitate Kenyan integration in social and cultural scopes in the tri-state area and promoting awareness of the culture of Kenya in the United States), the Minnesota Kenyan International Development Association ("MKIDA", formed in 2003, to improve education and the economy of the Kenyan Americans), KACA (Kenyan Americans Community Association), and KWITU (Kenyan Women In The United States).

The American Kenyan Educational Corporation focuses on funding secondary school students and building schools in Kenya.

== Notable people ==
- Barack Obama, 44th President of the United States; born to a Kenyan father of Luo descent
- Edi Gathegi, actor known for recurring character Dr. Jeffrey Cole (aka "Big Love") in the television series House, and as Laurent in the films Twilight and its sequel The Twilight Saga: New Moon
- Hamida Dakane – first Black and first Muslim person to serve in the North Dakota Legislative Assembly
- Elizabeth Furse – U.S. congresswoman from Oregon
- Huldah Hiltsley, Minnesota state representative
- Bernard Lagat, athlete for Kenya, now representing the US (of Nandi Kalenjin descent
- Tom Morello, rock guitarist; of Kikuyu, Irish, and Italian descent
- Liza Mucheru-Wisner, finalist on season 10 of reality show The Apprentice
- Ben Mutua Jonathan Muriithi, also known as BMJ Muriithi, journalist and actor based in Atlanta, Georgia; works for Kenyan media company Nation Media Group
- Isis Nyong'o, media and technology leader
- Mubarak Muyika, Silicon valley–based Entrepreneur known for founding his first company at 16 and selling it two years later in a six figure deal.
- Tavia Nyong'o, scholar and professor
- David Otunga, professional wrestler for WWE
- The Physics, hip hop group in Seattle, Washington; of Kenyan descent
- Mwende Window Snyder, of (American–Kamba descent), computer software engineer; senior security project manager at Apple Inc.
- Lupita Nyong'o, Kenyan actress and an Oscar recipient featured in the movie 12 Years a Slave, and many others
- Lawrence B. Jones-FOX News Conservative commentator, ancestral great-grandparents are of Kenyan descent
- KayCyy, rapper, singer and songwriter; born in Nairobi
- Ngugi wa Thiong'o, author and professor
- Kira Noir, adult film actress and activist

== See also ==
- Southeast Africans in the United States
- Kenyans in Italy
- Kenyans in Norway
- Kenyan Australians
- Kenyan migration to the United Kingdom
- Kenya–United States relations
