= Nyong'o =

Nyong'o is a surname and may refer to:

- Isis Nyong'o, Kenyan business executive
- Lupita Nyong'o (born 1983), Kenyan actress and filmmaker
- Peter Anyang' Nyong'o (born 1945), Kenyan politician
- Tavia Nyong'o (born 1974), Kenyan-American cultural critic, historian and performance studies scholar
