= Uganda–United States relations =

- Uganda: United States

Uganda–United States relations are bilateral diplomatic, economic, social and political relations between Uganda and the United States.

== History ==
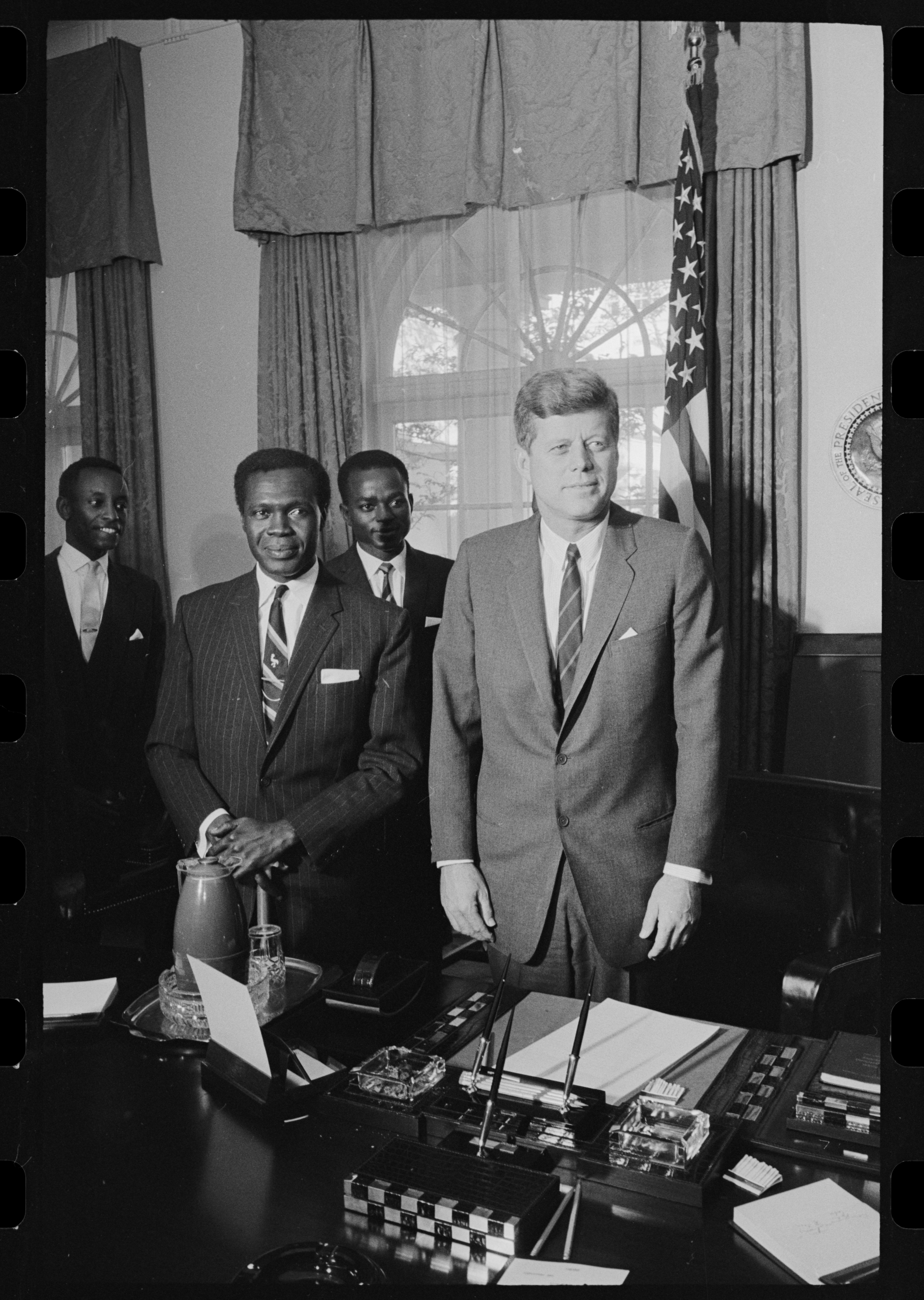
Prime Minister Milton Obote in the Oval Office With President John F. Kennedy during Obote's visit to the US shortly after Uganda gained Independence (October 22, 1962)

Although U.S.–Ugandan relations were strained during the rule of Idi Amin in the 1970s, relations improved after Amin's fall. In mid-1979, the United States reopened its embassy in Kampala. Relations with successor governments were cordial, although Milton Obote and his administration rejected strong U.S. criticism of Uganda's human rights situation.

Bilateral relations between the United States and Uganda have improved since Museveni assumed power, and the United States has welcomed his efforts to end human rights abuses and to pursue economic reform. Uganda is a strong supporter of the Global War on Terror. The United States is helping Uganda achieve export-led economic growth through the African Growth and Opportunity Act and provides a significant amount of development assistance. At the same time, the United States is concerned about continuing human rights problems and the pace of progress toward the establishment of genuine political pluralism.

Relations between the two countries were adversely affected when, on June 19, 2014, the Obama administration cut funding to Uganda in addition to canceling a planned military exercise with their armed forces in response to Uganda's outlawing of homosexuality that February, which had already been met with worldwide condemnation, especially from the Western world. On June 20, the Ugandan government accused the U.S. of "blackmail". Relations have since improved under the first Donald Trump administration.

During the second Trump administration, Uganda agreed to accept third-country deportees from the US in August 2025.

== Developmental and economic relations ==
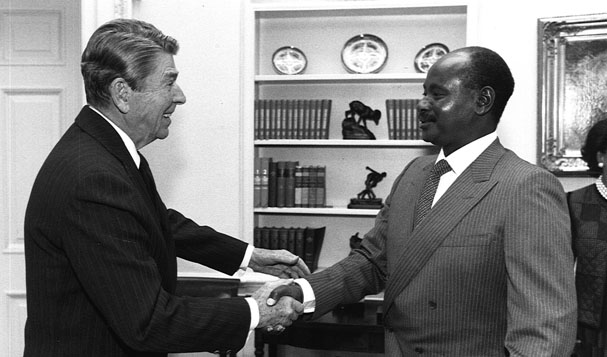
President Reagan meeting with President Museveni in 1987

U.S. development assistance in Uganda has the overall goal of reducing mass poverty. Most U.S. program assistance is focused in the areas of health, education, and agriculture. Both the U.S. Agency for International Development (USAID) and the Centers for Disease Control (CDC) have major programs to fight the HIV/AIDS pandemic. Other programs promote trade and investment, curb environmental degradation, encourage the peaceful resolution of local and international conflicts, and promote honest and open government. The United States also provides large amounts of humanitarian assistance to populations without access to adequate food supplies because of conflict, drought and other factors.

U.S. Peace Corps Volunteers are active in primary teacher training and HIV/AIDS programs. The Department of State carries out cultural exchange programs, brings Fulbright lecturers and researchers to Uganda, and sponsors U.S. study and tour programs for a wide variety of officials from government, non-governmental organizations and the private sector. Through Ambassador's Self-Help Fund, local groups in poor areas receive assistance for small projects with a high level of community involvement.

On December 10, 2025, Uganda signed an agreement with the United States over health care assistance. The United States agreed to provide up to $1.7 billion in aid over the next five years. In return, Uganda must invest $500 million into its own health care system in this same time period. This deal was part of a larger effort by the Trump administration to procure bilateral aid agreements that differ from the multilateral approach taken by the World Health Organization and differ from traditional USAID delivery methods. The United States has signed similar deals with 16 other African countries as of March 2026.

== Diplomatic representation ==
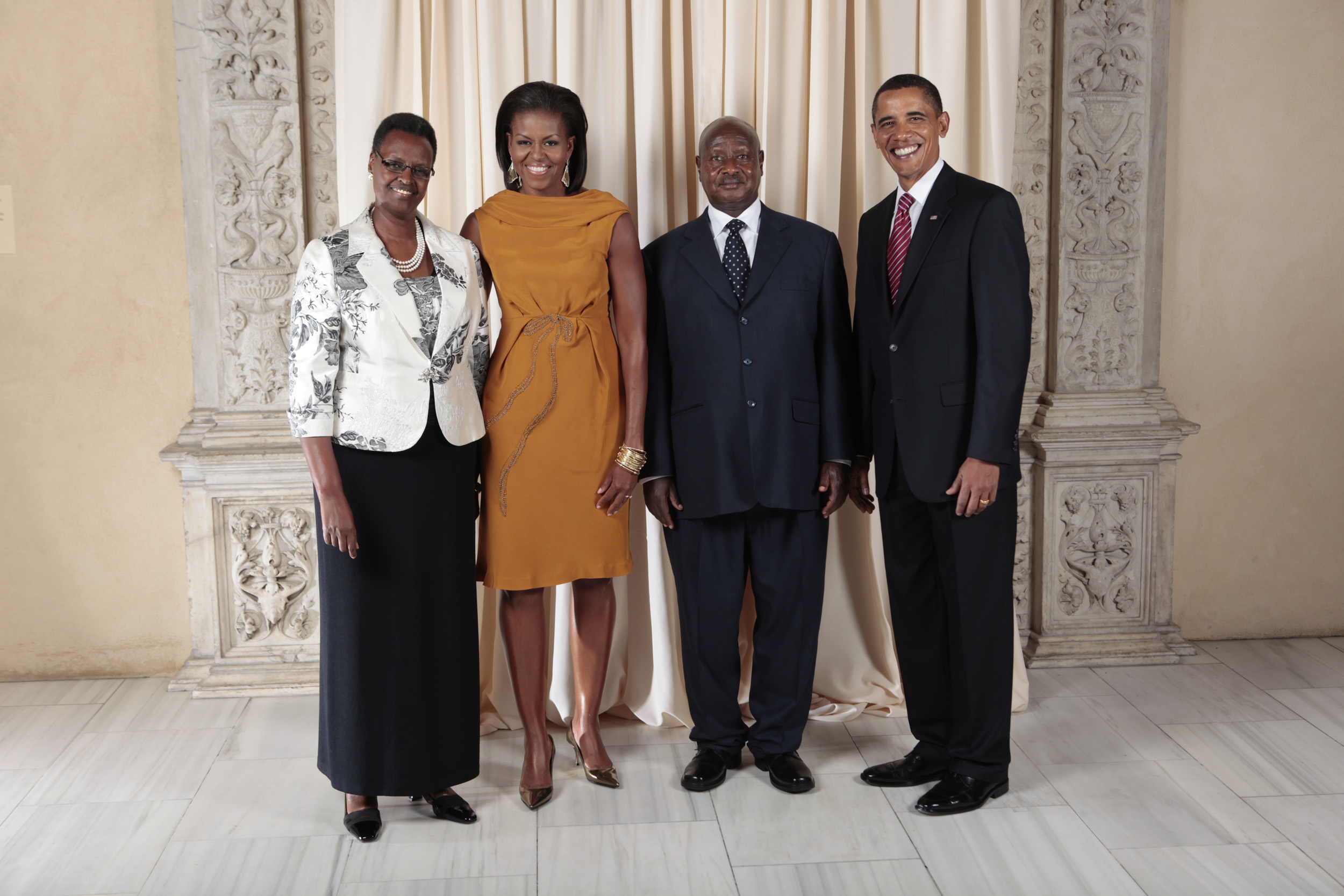
Yoweri Kaguta Museveni with the Obamas in 2009

The U.S. maintains an embassy in Kampala, Uganda. Principal U.S. Officials include Ambassador William W. Popp.

== Civil society relations ==
U.S.-Ugandan relations also benefit from significant contributions to health care, nutrition, education, and park systems from U.S. missionaries, non-governmental organizations, private universities, HIV/AIDS researchers, and wildlife organizations. Expatriate Ugandans living in the U.S. also promote stronger links between the two countries.

== Public opinion ==
According to the 2012 U.S. Global Leadership Report, 79% of Ugandans approve of U.S. leadership, with 11% disapproving and 10% uncertain.

== See also ==
- Ugandan Americans
- Foreign relations of Uganda
- Foreign relations of the United States
- Southeast Africans in the United States
