= Richard Mosse =

Irish conceptual documentary photographer

- Born: 1980 (age 45–46); Kilkenny, Ireland
- Education: King's College London, London Consortium, Goldsmiths, University of London, Yale School of Art
- Known for: Photography
- Notable work: Infra, The Enclave, Incoming, Broken Spectre
- Awards: Guggenheim Fellowship; 2011; Deutsche Börse Photography Prize; 2014; Prix Pictet; 2017 Heat Maps; Honorary Fellowship – Royal Photographic Society; 2020; S+T+ARTS Grand Prize for Innovative Collaboration – STARTS Prize; 2023; Philip Guston Rome Prize Fellow – American Academy in Rome; 2025-6
- Website: richardmosse.com

Richard Mosse (born 1980) is an Irish artist who works with photography and video.

== Early life and education ==
Mosse was born in Kilkenny, Ireland. He received a first class BA in English literature from King's College London in 2001, an MRes in cultural studies from the London Consortium in 2003, a postgraduate diploma in fine art from Goldsmiths, University of London in 2005 and a photography MFA from Yale School of Art in 2008.

== Life and work ==
As of 2023 he lives and works in New York City and Ireland. He has worked in Iraq, Iran, Pakistan, Palestine, Haiti and the former Yugoslavia.

Mosse made photographs of the war in the eastern Democratic Republic of Congo using colour infrared film with which he intended to create a new perspective on conflict. Kodak Aerochrome is a false-color infrared film originally intended for aerial vegetation surveys and for military reconnaissance, such as to identify camouflaged targets. It registers light that is invisible to humans, rendering the grass and trees and soldiers' uniforms in vivid hues of lavender, crimson and hot pink. He used this same film to make a documentary film entitled The Enclave, with cinematographer Trevor Tweeten and composer Ben Frost. This work was published in three publications, exhibited in solo exhibitions, and won the Deutsche Börse Photography Prize in 2014.

In 2017 his video installation Incoming, commissioned by the National Gallery of Victoria and the Barbican Art Gallery, also made with Frost and Tweeten, won the Prix Pictet.

2023 he had his the insulation for Broken Spectre the video Installation is a 74 minute on the deforestation of Amazon rainforest. The video spans a 20 metric panoramic screen creating a close up immersive experience. It was created in partnership with San Francisco museum of Modern Art.

In 2024 Mosse was awarded the Rome Prize in Visual Art at the American Academy in Rome.

== Reception ==
Critic Sean O'Hagan, writing in The Guardian, said "His images from there often seem to skirt the real and the fictional, simply though [sic] their heightened and unreal colours. He has made the familiar seem strange and the real seem heightened to the point of absurdity. This is war reportage – but not as we know it." Willy Staley, writing in the New York Times Magazine, said "Mosse highlights the eastern Congo's natural bounty while acknowledging both the medium's origins and, he points out, the West's tendency to see in the Congo only darkness and insanity."

Mosse has received criticism for his work, notably from Ireland, for presenting difficult global conflicts or deeply personal situations amidst these conflicts in an overly aestheticised way, being described as "troubling", and discomforting. According to Sarah Bassnett writing in the Oxford Art Journal, "These critiques point to a sense of discomfort with the work but decontextualise certain features to oversimplify its nuanced meaning." Early in his career, Mosse has stated that "beauty is the sharpest tool in the box" when it comes to communication and advocacy for overlooked humanitarian issues.

=== Beasts of No Nation ===
In 2015, Artnet published an article suggesting that Cary Joji Fukunaga had appropriated content for his movie Beasts of No Nation without crediting the work of Richard Mosse, of his infrared photos of child soldiers in the Democratic Republic of Congo.

== Publications ==
- Infra. New York, NY: Aperture, 2012. With an essay by Adam Hochschild.
  - Hardback. ISBN 978-1597112024.
  - Collector's edition. Edition of 500 copies.
- The Enclave. New York, NY: Aperture, 2013. With an essay by Jason Stearns.
  - Paperback. ISBN 978-1597112635. Edition of 750 copies.
  - Boxed set. Edition of 250 copies. Includes a vinyl record with sound and music, designed by Ben Frost; a poster featuring an image by Mosse; a transcription from the film; and a signed-and-numbered copy of the book.
- A Supplement to The Enclave. Berlin: Broken Dimanche Press, 2014. ISBN 978-3-943196-25-2. Edited by John Holten. With texts by Chrisy Lange, Patrick Mudekereza and Charles Stankievech and conversations between Richard Mosse and Trevor Tweeten and Ben Frost. Newspaper format.
- Richard Mosse Catalogue. Curve Publications. London: Barbican, 2017. With an interview between Mosse and Alona Pardo, and a text by Anthony Downey.
- Incoming. London: Mack, 2017. ISBN 978-1-910164-77-8. With texts by Giorgio Agamben and Mosse.
- The Castle. London: Mack, 2018. With texts in a booklet by Judith Butler, Paul K Saint Amour, Behrouz Boochani and Mosse. ISBN 978-1-912339-18-1. Second edition, 2019.
- Broken Spectre. Marseille: Loose Joints, 2022, co-published with 180 Studios and Converge45. With texts in a booklet by Txai Suruí, Gabriel Bogossian, Christian Viveros-Fauné, Jon Lee Anderson and an interview by Hans Ulrich Obrist. ISBN 978-1-912719-43-3.
- Tate Photography: Richard Mosse. London: TATE, 2023. Edited by Yasufumi Nakamori. ISBN 9781849768689.

== Filmography ==
- The Enclave (2013) – commissioned by the National Pavilion of Ireland at the 55th Venice Biennale. A collaboration with cinematographer Trevor Tweeten and composer Ben Frost. Made using 16 mm infrared film transferred to HD video. Shown as an installation comprising multiple double-sided screens installed in a darkened chamber.
- Incoming (2017) – commissioned by Barbican Art Galleries and National Gallery of Victoria. A collaboration with composer Ben Frost and cinematographer Tweeten Tweeten.
- Broken Spectre (2022) – commissioned National Gallery of Victoria, by VIA Art Fund, the Westridge Foundation, and the Serpentine Galleries, with additional support from Jack Shainman Gallery and Collection SVPL. A collaboration with Ben Frost and cinematographer Trevor Tweeten.

== Solo exhibitions ==
- 2004: Richard Mosse, Camden People's Theatre, London.
- 2007: Nothing to Declare, Derby Museum & Art Gallery, Derby University.
- 2008: Trainers, Kilkenny Arts Festival, Ireland.
- 2012: Infra, curated by Sheila Pratschke, Centre Culturel Irlandais, Paris.
- 2012: Infra, curated by Peggy-Sue Amison, Sirius Arts Centre, Cobh.
- 2012: Remains Of The Day, curated by Isolde Brielmaier, Savannah College of Art & Design, Dewberry Gallery, Atlanta and Moot Gallery, Hong Kong.
- 2012: Infra, curated by Karen Newman, Open Eye Gallery, Liverpool.
- 2012: Infra, curated by Xandra Eden, Weatherspoon Art Museum, University of North Carolina at Greensboro.
- 2012: Infra, Mermaid Arts Centre, Bray.
- 2012: Infra, curated by Christoph Tannert, Künstlerhaus Bethanien, Berlin.
- 2012: The Enclave, National Pavilion of Ireland at the 55th Venice Biennale.
- 2014: The Enclave, The Photographers' Gallery, London.
- 2014: The Enclave, The Vinyl Factory, London.
- 2014: The Enclave, curated by Cheryl Sim, DHC/ART Foundation for Contemporary Art, Montreal.
- 2014: The Enclave, curated by Joachim Naudts, FOMU Fotomuseum Antwerp.
- 2014: Fermata: Richard Mosse, curated by Shauta Marsh, The Indianopolis Museum of Art.
- 2014: The Devil You Know, curated by Christian Viveros-Fauné, Centro Atlantico de Arte Moderno, Gran Canaria, Spain.
- 2014: The Enclave, curated by Claudia Kussel, FOAM Fotografiemuseum Amsterdam.
- 2014: The Enclave, curated by Felicity Fenner, National Institute for Experimental Arts, University of New South Wales, Sydney.
- 2014: The Enclave, Royal Hibernian Academy, Dublin.
- 2014: The Enclave, Ormston House, Limerick.
- 2014: The Enclave, Richard Mosse, curated by Brian Ferriso, Portland Art Museum.
- 2015: The Enclave, curated by Simon Maidment, National Gallery of Victoria, Melbourne, Australia.
- 2015: The Enclave, curated by Marshall Price, Nasher Museum of Art, Duke University, Durham, North Carolina.
- 2015: The Enclave, curated by Marie Laurberg, Louisiana Museum of Modern Art, Humlebæk, Denmark.
- 2016: The Enclave, Hafnarhús Reykjavik Art Museum, Iceland.
- 2017: Incoming, Curve Gallery, Barbican Centre, London, curated by Alona Pardo.
- 2017: The Castle, Carlier Gebauer, Berlin.
- 2018: Incoming, Bunkier Sztuki Gallery of Contemporary Art, Krakow, Poland.
- 2018: The Castle, Joslyn Art Museum, Omaha, Nebraska.
- 2018: Beyond Here Lies Nothing, Arcadia University Art Gallery, Philadelphia, opening January, curated by Richard Torchia.
- 2019: Incoming, Le Lieu Unique, Nantes, France, curated by Patrick Gyger.
- 2019: Incoming, San Francisco Museum of Modern Art, curated by Rudolf Frieling.
- 2019: Incoming, National Gallery of Art, Washington DC, curated by Sarah Greenough.
- 2021: Richard Mosse, Displaced: Migration, Conflict, Climate Change, survey show, MAST Foundation, Bologna, curated by Urs Stahel.
- 2022: Richard Mosse, survey show, Kunsthalle Bremen, curated by Eva Fischer-Hausdorf.
- 2022: Broken Spectre, National Gallery of Victoria, Melbourne, curated by Ewan McEoin.
- 2023: Broken Spectre, Minnesota Street Project & SFMOMA, San Francisco.
- 2024: Broken Spectre, Madison Museum of Contemporary Art, Wisconsin.
- 2024: Broken Spectre, MUNA Tenerife, Canary Islands, Spain.
- 2024: Broken Spectre, PHI Centre, Montreal.

== Awards ==
- 2006–2008: Leonore Annenberg Fellowship in the Performing and Visual Arts from the Annenberg Public Policy Center, University of Pennsylvania
- 2011: Guggenheim Fellowship from the John Simon Guggenheim Memorial Foundation
- 2014: Deutsche Börse Photography Prize
- 2017: Prix Pictet, for Heat Maps
- 2020: Honorary Fellowship of the Royal Photographic Society, Bristol
- 2024-5: Philip Guston Rome Prize at the American Academy in Rome
