= The Centre Cannot Hold =

The Centre Cannot Hold may refer to:

- "the centre cannot hold", a phrase from the poem "The Second Coming" by William Butler Yeats

== Literature ==
- American Empire: The Center Cannot Hold, a 2002 novel by Harry Turtledove
- The Centre Cannot Hold, a 2006 Star Trek novel by Mike W. Barr
- The Centre Cannot Hold, a 1990 novel by Brian Stableford
- The Center Cannot Hold: My Journey Through Madness, a 2007 book by Elyn Saks
- The Center Holds: Obama and His Enemies, a 2013 book by Jonathan Alter

== Other uses ==
- Joan Didion: The Center Will Not Hold, a 2017 documentary directed by Griffin Dunne
- The Centre Cannot Hold, a 2004 EP by Digitonal
- The Centre Cannot Hold (album), a 2017 album by Ben Frost
- The Center Won't Hold, a 2019 album by Sleater-Kinney
- "The Center Will Not Hold, Twenty Centuries Of Stony Sleep", a 2021 song by Junkie XL from the soundtrack of Zack Snyder's Justice League
