= Ugandan Americans =

Americans of Ugandan birth or descent

Wamarekani wa Uganda

Total population
- 30,060 (Ugandan ancestry) (2024); 43,611 (Uganda-born) (2024)

Regions with significant populations
- New York City; Boston; Waltham; Philadelphia; New Jersey; Chicago; Milwaukee; Delaware; Baltimore–Washington, D.C.; North Carolina; Kentucky; Atlanta; Miami; Minneapolis–Saint Paul; Texas; Seattle; Denver; California

Languages
- American English, Ugandan English, Luganda, Runyakore

Religion
- Christians, minority Muslims and Practitioners of Ugandan traditional religion.

Related ethnic groups
- Congolese Americans; Eritrean Americans; Ethiopian Americans; Kenyan Americans; Somali Americans; South Sudanese Americans; Tanzanian Americans

Ugandan Americans are Americans of Ugandan birth, descent, or ancestry. The U.S. Census Bureau’s American Community Survey (ACS) reports both (1) people who identify Ugandan ancestry and (2) people who are foreign-born from Uganda; these measures are not identical and should be cited separately.

The city of Waltham, Massachusetts has been described as a center of Ugandan community life in the Greater Boston area and has been nicknamed "Little Kampala". The Ugandan North American Association (UNAA) is headquartered in Waltham, along with St. Peters Church of Uganda Boston.

== History ==
Ugandan migration to the United States grew in different waves. Early flows included students and professionals in the post-independence period, followed by larger movements shaped by political upheaval in the 1970s and 1980s and the expansion of U.S. immigration pathways after the 1965 Immigration and Nationality Act. Many Ugandan emigrants were seminarians and clerics, who moved from Chicago to settle in places like Minneapolis-St. Paul, to study theology and later become pastors for African congregations.

In 1975, 859 Ugandans emigrated, most fleeing Idi Amin's regime. They were mostly of Indian descent, whose families had lived in Uganda for several generations.

The passing of the 1965 Immigration Act, the Refugee Act of 1980, as well as the Diversity Visa Program of the Immigration Act of 1990, contributed to an increased emigration from Uganda to the United States. In the 1980s, there was a steady and gradual growth in number of Ugandans in North America, particularly in the US, where some immigrated via the DV - lottery system. However, Ugandan immigration fell to less than 150 each year in the late 1980s and early 1990s, a time of political stability in Uganda.

In the late 20th and early 21st centuries, Ugandan migration also included family reunification, employment-based immigration, and refugees/asylum seekers connected to regional conflicts in the Great Lakes and Horn of Africa. Few Ugandan refugees obtained permanent residency status in the US, viz from 1946 to 1996, fewer than 50 people. However, in 1993 and 1994, 87 people and 79 people obtained US permanent residency status respectively.

== Demographics ==
=== Population measures ===
The U.S. Census Bureau reports Ugandan Americans using more than one measure:

- Ancestry (people who self-identify Ugandan ancestry in the ACS ancestry question).
- Uganda-born (foreign-born population whose place of birth is Uganda).

Most people who immigrate come from cities, especially Kampala, and rural emigration is low. Ugandans who want to work in rural areas or in public practice do not usually migrate.

Many Ugandans in United States are medical, legal, computer scientists, workers or engage in civil service, work in blue-collar jobs or religious professions.

Many Ugandan nurses immigrate to the United States and Canada, and formerly to the UK, due to high rates of pay. Due to emigration for financial benefit there are few nurses in Uganda and 70% of them want to emigrate. The U.S. is perceived to have better pay and less competition to enter the country. Most students who migrate learned about opportunities for the emigration of their friends and colleagues who had already emigrated, because information on migration in Uganda isn't very accessible.

According to the Migration Policy Institute, the total number of immigrants in the USA from Uganda estimated for 2015 to 2019 was 31,400, the state with the largest number being Massachusetts with 5,200 people.

=== Geographic distribution ===
Migration Policy Institute tabulations of pooled ACS data identify notable concentrations of Uganda-born residents in several U.S. states and counties, including parts of Massachusetts, California, Maryland, and Georgia.

Ugandan migration to the United States includes people of diverse ethnic and racial backgrounds, including indigenous Ugandans as well as families of South Asian origin—particularly Indians, Pakistanis, and Goans—whose communities had been established in Uganda during the colonial period and after. A distinct strand of this migration was shaped by the expulsion of Asians from Uganda in 1972, when Idi Amin ordered the removal of Uganda’s South Asian population amid rising anti-Asian sentiment and economic nationalism, leading many expelled families and their descendants to resettle in countries including the United States.

Ugandan Americans are concentrated in several major metropolitan areas, including the Greater Boston region, the New York City area, the Baltimore–Washington, D.C. region, Chicago, Minneapolis–Saint Paul, Metro Atlanta, Dallas–Fort Worth, Seattle, and Los Angeles.

The top counties of Ugandan settlement in the United States were as follows:

1) Middlesex County, Massachusetts ------------------- 3,400 2) Los Angeles County, CA -------------------- 1,500 3) Montgomery County, MD ------------------ 1,100

From the same source, with estimates now for 2017 to 2021, there were 32,900 Ugandan immigrants nationwide, with Massachusetts still in first place with 5,300 or 16% of th total, at least according to the MPI website. The top counties were now:

1) Middlesex County, Mass. ----------------‐--- 4,100 2) Los Angeles County, CA ----------‐---------- 2,000 3) DeKalb County, GA ------------------------------ 1,400

== Integration and civic life ==
Ugandan American community life often centers on religious congregations, mutual-aid associations, alumni and district associations, and cultural events (including weddings, funerals, and holiday gatherings). Community organizations also support newcomers with housing, employment connections, and social services referrals.

English proficiency is generally high among Ugandan immigrants because English is an official language of Uganda. Ugandan Americans participate in U.S. civic and professional life while maintaining cultural ties through language, religion, and community organizations. Some newly arrived Ugandans receive assistance from Catholic Social Services and other humanitarian relief agencies.

== Organizations ==
Ugandan Americans have established community organizations, religious institutions, and social networks that support new arrivals and help maintain cultural ties, while also contributing to civic and professional life in U.S. metropolitan areas. The Ugandan North American Association (UNAA) is among the best-known Ugandan diaspora organizations in North America and is associated with an annual convention and related programming.

Remittances sent to Uganda by migrants are tracked in balance-of-payments statistics; the World Bank reports annual personal remittances received for Uganda in its development indicators well exceed $1.5 billion annually.

The period of the month of May through August has major Ugandan themed conventions that bring together the Ugandans in North America. These events include the Banyankore Kweterana International (BKI), Basoga Twegaite, Buganda Bumu North American Convention (BBNAC), Bunyonyo Kitara North American Association (BKNAA), International Community of Banyakigezi (ICOB), Tooro American association (TAA), North American Masaba Cultural Association (NAMCA), and the Ugandan North American Association (UNAA) Convention and Trade Expo which will host its 38th Annual covention in 2026 in Denver, Colorado.

== Notable people ==
- Milton Allimadi; professor, author and journalist, son of former Ugandan Prime Minister Otema Allimadi.
- Shimit Amin; film director and editor, best known for directing Chak De! India
- Tenywa Bonseu; retired footballer who played professionally for New York Red Bulls, FC Dallas in the United States
- Isolde Brielmaier; Deputy Director of the New Museum in New York City, curator, dancer, and scholar
- Ivan Edwards (physician); physician, former USAF Reserve flight surgeon, and community leader
- Simon Peter Engurait; Bishop of Houma–Thibodaux in the Roman Catholic Church
- Zinhle Essamuah; filmmaker, journalist and news anchor at NBC News Daily
- Ernest Hausmann; American football linebacker for the Michigan Wolverines where he won a national championship in 2024.
- Jessica Horn; Regional Director for the Ford Foundation's East Africa office, poet, feminist writer, women's rights activist
- Kiara Kabukuru; fashion model
- Arthur Kaluma; basketball player for the South Bay Lakers of the NBA G League, played for the Texas Longhorns, Kansas State Wildcats and Creighton Bluejays
- Derreck Kayongo; founder of the Global Soap Project, former Chief Executive Officer, National Center for Civil and Human Rights in Atlanta GA.
- Katiti Kironde; fashion designer and first African woman to appear on the cover of women's magazine. Her issue Glamour (August 1968) where she featured on as a freshman at Harvard University remains the best-selling college issue.
- Isaya Kisekka; agricultural engineer, professor at University of California, Davis, pioneer of the development of precision irrigation systems.
- Mathias Kiwanuka; former National Football League defensive end
- Tanoh Kpassagnon; current National Football League defensive end for the Kansas City Chiefs
- Shirish Korde; composer and chair of the Music Department at the College of the Holy Cross in Worcester, Massachusetts.
- Brian Mushana Kwesiga; former president and CEO, Ugandan North American Association (UNAA), 2013-2015, entrepreneur, engineer
- Otandeka Laki; Ugandan footballer who plays as a winger/striker for Doncaster Rovers Belles and the Uganda women's national team.
- Victor LaValle; associate professor at the Columbia University School of the Arts, author
- Mahmood Mamdani; Ugandan-born academic and political theorist, Herbert Lehman Professor of Government at Columbia University.
- Zohran Mamdani; Mayor of New York City, former member of the New York State Assembly , Ugandan of Indian origin.
- Ntare Mwine; stage and film actor, playwright, photographer and documentarian.
- Shoshana Nambi; first female rabbi from Uganda, assistant rabbi at Congregation Beth Am in Los Altos Hills, California.
- Jessica Nabongo; travel writer and blogger
- Tendo Nagenda; Vice President of Original Films at Netflix, former executive vice president of production at Disney, film producer and studio executive
- Peter Nazareth; literary critic and writer of fiction and drama
- Rajat Neogy; founder of Transition Magazine, a Ugandan of Indian Bengali origin.
- Assumpta Oturu; journalist and poet, founder and host of the weekly radio programme, 'Spotlight Africa', on the Los Angeles–based radio station KPFK.
- Kassim Ouma; former IBF junior middleweight champion (2004-005)
- Kash Patel; American lawyer serving since 2025 as the director of the Federal Bureau of Investigation
- Samite; New York based musician, plays the flute and kalimba, a type of thumb piano. His seventh album, Embalasasa, was released in 2005 by Triloka Records.
- Rina Shah; American political strategist and commentator
- Somi (singer); Grammy-nominated singer, songwriter, playwright, and actress
- Ibrahim Sekagya; assistant coach for the New York Red Bulls, and retired professional footballer in Major League Soccer
- Sala Senkayi; environmental scientist at the United States Environmental Protection Agency, first Ugandan-born woman to win the Presidential Early Career Award for Scientists and Engineers
- Ham Serunjogi; entrepreneur and co-founder of Chipper Cash, Forbes 30 Under 30 class of 2023, member of President Biden’s Advisory Council on African Diaspora
- Patrick Ssenjovu; film and theatre actor

== See also ==
- Southeast Africans in the United States
- Ugandan diaspora
- Uganda–United States relations
- Ugandan migration to the United Kingdom
