= Derreck Kayongo =

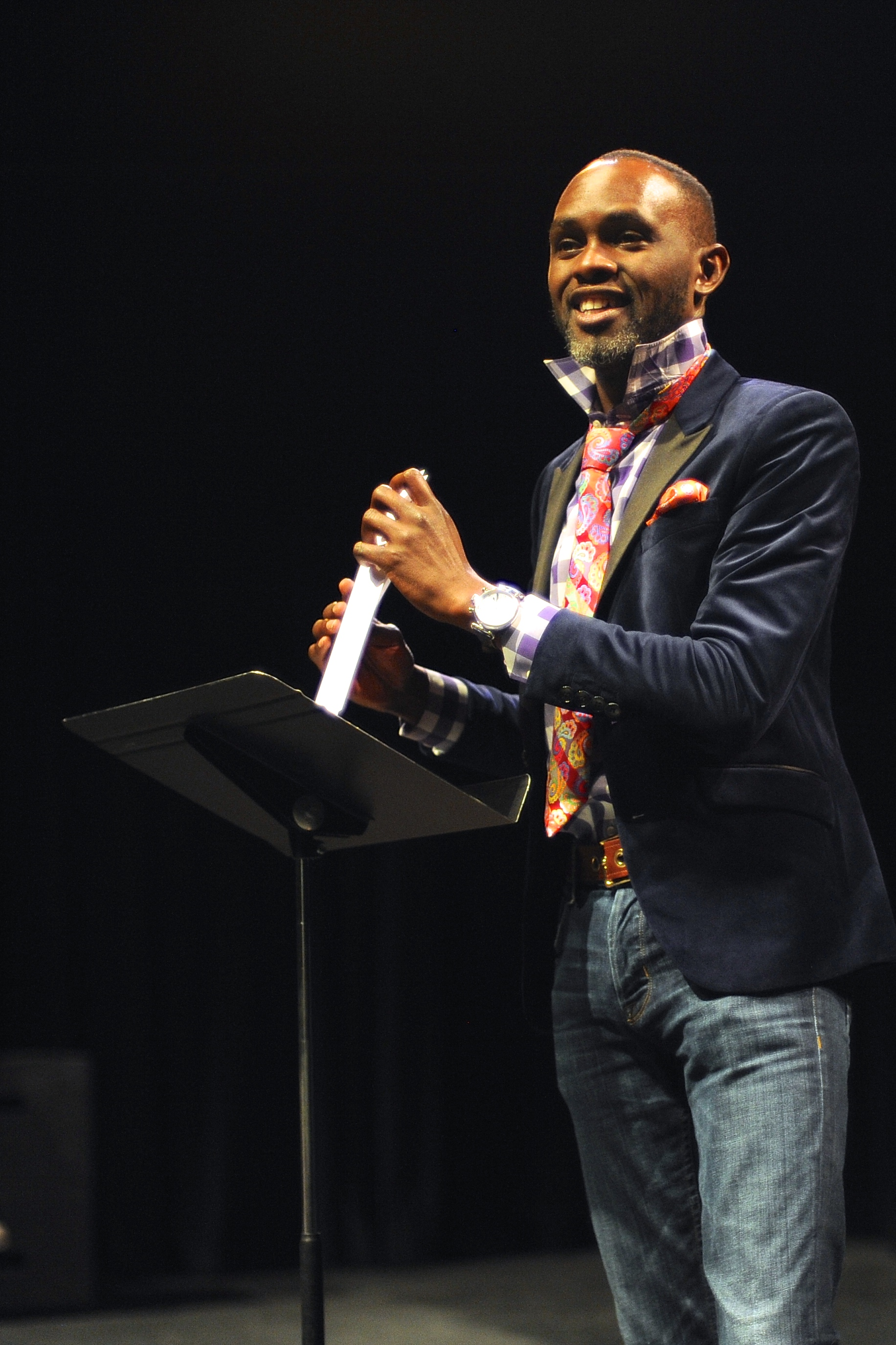
Derreck Kayongo at Theater Emory's Breaking Ground Series – Emory University 2015

Derreck Kayongo is a Ugandan American entrepreneur and human rights innovator born on January 25, 1970, in Kampala, Uganda, just before General Idi Amin Dada seized power in a military coup. As violence spread through the country and civil war erupted, Kayongo and his family became refugees in Kenya. He later immigrated to America to attend the Tufts University in Boston and received two honorary doctors in Philosophy.

Though most well known as the founder of the Global Soap Project, Kayongo is an expert in environmental sustainability and global health, as well as a former CEO of the National Center for Civil and Human Rights in Atlanta, Georgia. In 2016 the Georgia State Senate passed a resolution recognizing Kayongo's incredible journey from refugee to CEO.

== Education ==
Derreck Kayongo holds an honorary doctorate from Oglethorpe University and is a graduate of the prestigious Fletcher school of Law and Diplomacy at Tufts University. He was also made an honoris causa initiate of Omicron Delta Kappa at East Carolina University in 2013.

== The National Center for Civil and Human Rights ==
In 2015 Derreck Kayongo was chosen as the chief executive officer for the National Center for Civil and Human Rights in Atlanta GA. The center is located in downtown Atlanta at Centennial Olympic Park on land donated by the Coca-Cola Company and is involved in a wide range of human rights issues. Under Kayongo's leadership, the Center became even more vital to Atlanta's social and political scenes. In addition to the center's moving and beautifully designed galleries, the space is used for corporate meetings, weddings, and a wide variety of events. He resigned as CEO in March 2018 to "focus on efforts as a motivational speaker as well as to write a book"

== Public life and speaking ==
In 2014, Kayongo joined the elite TED TALK speakers in Charleston, SC, and he travels the world sharing his knowledge and experiences. In his words, he is "giving voice to the voiceless" since many people affected by displacement and civil war never have a chance to be heard. Known for his optimistic energy, Kayongo's stories entertain, educate, and inspire audiences of all ages and backgrounds. He has done hundreds of interviews around the world and has been seen on CNN, the Christiana Amanpour Show, and BBC's Focus on Africa. In December 2015, Bo Emerson of The Atlanta Journal-Constitution referenced an earlier AJC article, writing that "In describing Kayongo's rhetorical skills, staff writer Matt Kempner wrote, "This is his greatest strength: getting people inspired to see the bigger picture. Convincing them that even the little guy can do something big."

President Jimmy Carter chose Kayongo to interview him as part of the National Archives Amending America Initiative.

In 2018, Kayongo delivered the keynote address at the Ugandan North American Association (UNAA) convention in Seattle, Washington.
