= Isis Nyong'o =

Kenyan–American entrepreneur

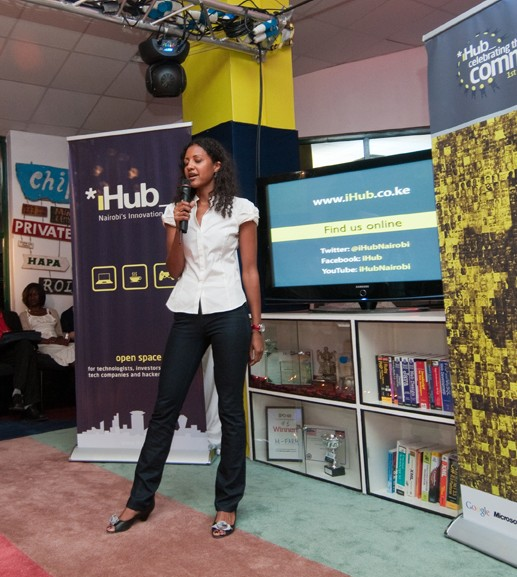
- Nyong'o at a conference in 2011
- Education: Stanford University; Harvard Business School

Isis Nyong’o Madison is a Kenyan–American media and technology entrepreneur. Currently the principal at strategic advisory firm Asphalt & Ink, she has also previously worked with InMobi, Google and MTV Africa. She is a senior advisor at Albright Stonebridge Group. She is also the founder of Mum's Village, an online platform transforming the mother-child experience in Kenya.

== Career ==
Branded as one of "Africa's Top 20 Youngest Power Women" by Forbes, Madison has served as the managing director of Africa for InMobi. Prior to this, she specialized in mobile and local content partnerships at Google. She was among the team that led MTV Network's commercial foray into Africa.

Madison holds degrees from Stanford University and Harvard Business School.

Madison was named as one of the top 40 women under 40 in Kenya in 2011 by Business Daily Africa as well as shortlisted on the Forbes Top 20 Youngest Power Women in Africa, on IT News Africa's Top 10 Women in ICT and Africa's most powerful women in tech, 2013. She serves on the board of the Mango Tree Orphan Trust in Kenya. She was selected as a Young Global Leader by the World Economic Forum in 2012. She currently serves on the global Advisory Council for CFK Africa, a leading NGO working in Kenyan informal settlements.

== Personal life ==
Her family includes politician Peter Anyang' Nyong'o, Yale professor Tavia Nyong'o and Academy Award winning actress Lupita Nyong'o.
