= Assumpta Oturu =

Ugandan-American journalist and poet (born 1953)

Assumpta Oturu (1953 – July 2, 2025) was a Ugandan American journalist and poet. She hosted a weekly radio programme, 'Spotlight Africa', on the Los Angeles–based radio station KPFK. She published poetry as Assumpta Acam-Oturu.

== Life ==
Acam-Oturu was born in Teso, Eastern Uganda. She obtained a diploma in journalism from Mindolo Ecumenical Centre's School of Journalism in Zambia, and in 1983 earned a BA in Journalism and International Relations from the University of Southern California. She started 'Spotlight Africa' on KPFK in July 1986, to address the lack of knowledge about Africa amongst Americans. The programme, broadcast weekly on Saturdays, documents African politics, economics, current affairs, social and women's issues.

Oturu appeared in the 2015 documentary Bound: Africans vs African Americans, which explored tensions in the African diaspora. Oturu emphasised the historical roots of these tensions, in the slave trade and African ignorance of the African American experience. At an African Diaspora Conference in November 2017 she emphasised the opportunities for Africans and African Americans to enlighten each other about the specificities of their respective cultures.

== Poetry ==
- 'A Fountain of Blood', Ufahamu: A Journal of African Studies, Vol. 16, Issue 1 (1988), p. 136
- 'Arise to the Day's Toil' and 'An Agony... A Resurrection', in Stella Chipasula & Frank Mkalawile Chipasula, eds., The Heinemann book of African women's poetry, Heinemann Educational Publishers, 1995.
- 'An Agony... A Resurrection', in Tanure Ojaide and Tijan M. Sallah, eds., The New African Anthology, Lynne Reinner Publishers, 1999.

== See also ==
- Ugandan Americans
