= Sala Senkayi =

Ugandan-born environmental scientist

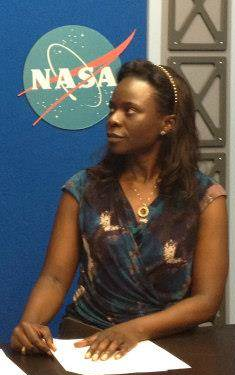
- Sala Senkayi at Converses with Students in 2013
- Born: Butambala District, Uganda
- Education: Texas A&M University; University of Texas at Arlington
- Awards: PECASE ('17)
- Scientific career
- Workplaces: United States Environmental Protection Agency

Sala Nanyanzi Senkayi is an Ugandan American environmental scientist at the United States Environmental Protection Agency. She was the first Ugandan-born woman to win the Presidential Early Career Award for Scientists and Engineers.

== Early life and education ==
Senkayi is the daughter of Abu Senkayi and Sunajeh Senkayi. Her family are from Butambala District in Uganda. Her father was an environmental scientist and worked at Texas A&M University as a research scientist from 1977.

Senkayi obtained a bachelor's degree in biomedical sciences from Texas A&M University in College Station, Texas. She joined the University of Texas at Arlington, earning two more Bachelor's degrees in microbiology and biology. Later, she earned a master's degree (2010) and a PhD (2012) degrees in environmental and earth sciences from the same university. Her PhD thesis considered the association between childhood leukaemia and proximity to airports in Texas. She found that benzene emissions were a predictor for childhood leukaemia. During her graduate studies Muwenda Mutebi II of Buganda and Sylvia Nnaginda visited her in Texas.

== Career ==
Senkayi joined the United States Environmental Protection Agency in 2007. She works with local children in schools and colleges talking about the environment. She initiated the EPA Converses with Students webcast, an opportunity for children to speak to scientists who worked on environmental protection on Earth Day. Her research focuses on water quality protection and she is the Water Quality Division Quality Assurance Officer. In 2017 Senkayi was awarded the Presidential Early Career Award for Scientists and Engineers for her "transformative" community outreach and research.
