= Kiara Kabukuru =

Ugandan-born American fashion model (born 1975)

- Born: Alice Kabukuru; 31 July 1975 (age 51); Kampala, Uganda
- Occupation: Model
- Years active: 1991-2000, 2008, 2012-present
- Modeling information
- Height: 1.75 m (5 ft 9 in)
- Hair color: Brown
- Eye color: Brown
- Agency: IMG Models (New York, Paris, Sydney); Ice Models (Cape Town); Mega Model Agency (Hamburg)

Kiara Kabukuru (born Alice Kabukuru, July 31, 1975) is a Ugandan American fashion model. Kabukuru is best known as a CoverGirl model.

== Personal life ==
Kabukuru was born as Alice Kabukuru in Kampala, Uganda to parents Moses Kabukuru and Erinah Kasabiti as one of four siblings. Although her grandparents emigrated from Rwanda to Uganda in 1920, she identifies as Munyankole. With the aid of Amnesty International and United Way, Kabukuru and her family emigrated to California when she was a child due to political unrest in their native country. Kabukuru was discovered by photographer Bill Bodwell in a Los Angeles shopping center when she was 16. She adopted the name Kiara at the suggestion of her then-agent at Ford Models.

In 2000, Kabukuru was involved in an accident while riding her bicycle in New York City when an 18-wheel truck collided with her. She required intensive facial reconstructive surgery and physical therapy. Kabukuru made a brief return to modeling in 2008 when she appeared in the All Black issue of Vogue Italia. In 2012, she returned to modeling full-time.

Kabukuru is a long-time close friend of model Gisele Bündchen, whom she credits with helping her return to modeling. Kabukuru is the godmother of Bündchen's son Benjamin.

== Career ==
Kabukuru has been represented by several of the world's top modeling agencies, including Women Management, Trump Model Management, and Why Not Model Agency, As of February 2011 she is represented by Silent models in New York and Paris. Kabukuru has walked for fashion houses including Dior, Versace, Calvin Klein, Chanel, and Balmain. Her most notable editorial work includes covers for Vogue (Spain and United States) and Amica Italy. She has posed for advertising campaigns by Dolce & Gabbana, Moschino, L'Oréal, Calvin Klein, Yves Saint Laurent, Gucci, and most famously CoverGirl cosmetics.

She was featured in the Pirelli Calendar of 1998 and walked the Victoria's Secret Fashion Show in 1999.

== See also ==
- Ugandan Americans
