= Ben Frost =

Australian musician and composer

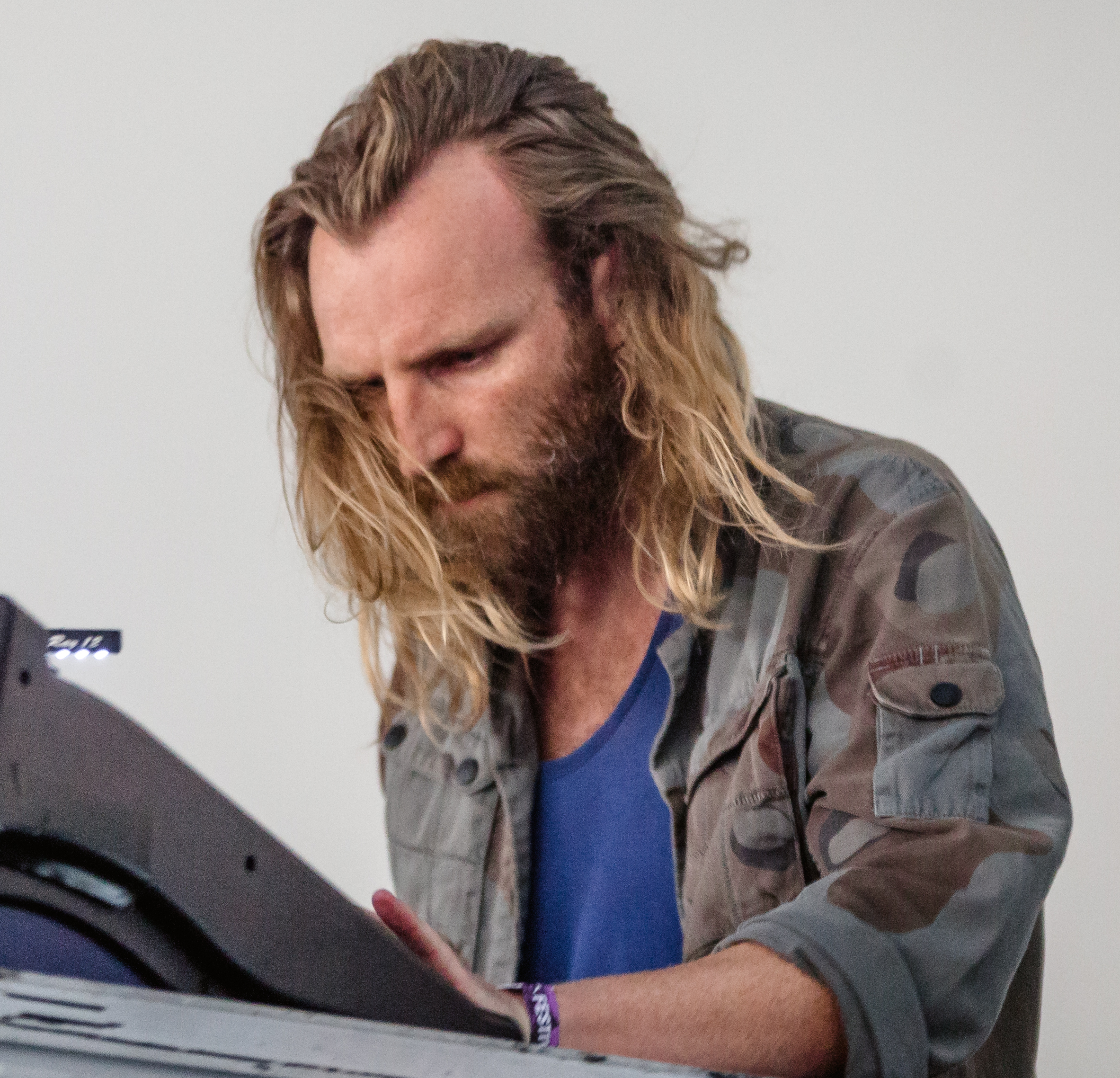
- Frost performing in 2018

Background information
- Born: 1980 (age 45–46); Melbourne, Victoria, Australia
- Genres: Experimental; electronic
- Occupations: Composer; producer; director; musician
- Labels: Room40; Bedroom Community; Mute
- Website: ethermachines.com

Ben Frost (born 1980) is an Australian/Icelandic musician, composer, record producer, sound designer and director born in Melbourne, Australia and based in Reykjavík, Iceland since 2005.

Frost has contributed to albums by Canadian electronic musician Tim Hecker and American experimental rock band Swans.

== Career ==
Born in Melbourne, Australia, and based in Reykjavík, Iceland, since 2005, Frost composes minimalist, instrumental, and experimental music, with influences ranging from classical minimalism to punk rock and black metal.

His early releases include the guitar-oriented albums Steel Wound (2003) and School of Emotional Engineering (as part of the band School of Emotional Engineering) (2004). Theory of Machines (2007) marked a radical shift toward more angular aggressive music and was further advanced on the critically acclaimed By The Throat (2009). In 2011, commissioned by Unsound Festival, and as part of a collaboration with Brian Eno and fellow Icelandic composer Daníel Bjarnason, Frost released Solaris, a conceptual album which rescored Andrei Tarkovsky's film of the same name. In 2014 after signing with British record label Mute Records, Frost released the critically lauded and distinctly more rhythmical album Aurora. In 2017 Frost traveled to Chicago to record The Centre Cannot Hold with Steve Albini. In addition to his studio albums, Frost has collaborated with contemporary dance companies Chunky Move, the Icelandic Dance Company Contemporary Dance of Cuba and the British choreographer Wayne McGregor. He composed the music for Wayne McGregor's 2010 production FAR.

Frost co-composed Music for Solaris with Daníel Bjarnason, which was inspired by both Stanisław Lem's novel Solaris and the 1972 Tarkovsky film of the same name. It was performed by Frost, Bjarnason, and Sinfonietta Cracovia. He composed the music for the films Sleeping Beauty, the Icelandic drama The Deep, and the 2015 British television series Fortitude. In 2012, he traveled to the Democratic Republic of Congo with Richard Mosse, along with Trevor Tweeten to score the sound for Mosse's artwork The Enclave.

In 2013, in his first directorial role, he premiered a critically acclaimed music-theatre adaptation of the Iain Banks novel The Wasp Factory.

In 2015, Frost, in collaboration with Paul Haslinger, created the score for Tom Clancy's Rainbow Six Siege.

Two years later, in 2017, Frost scored the film Super Dark Times. In that same year, he premiered a new installation at the Barbican Centre in London, titled Incoming, with Richard Mosse and Trevor Tweeten. The piece used advanced surveillance technology to comment on the refugee crisis in Europe, and later toured worldwide.

From 2017 to 2020, Frost created the score for all three seasons of Netflix's German sci-fi thriller Dark. In 2022, Frost, Mosse and Tweeten premiered their third collaborative installation, Broken Spectre, at 180 the Strand in London. Frost premiered two new sound installations in 2023, Enduring Amazon at the Momentary in Arkansas and The Predatory Chord at the Megaron in Athens.

=== Collaborations ===
In 2005, Frost remixed Björk's song "Desired Constellation", which was featured as the B-side to the "Triumph of a Heart" single. He engineered and played the keyboards on Tim Hecker's albums Ravedeath, 1972 and Virgins, which were recorded by Frost in Reykjavík. He was the mixing engineer on Colin Stetson's albums New History Warfare Vol. 2: Judges and New History Warfare Vol. 3: To See More Light. He was a recording engineer for A Winged Victory for the Sullen. Frost participated in the recording of the Swans albums The Seer, Leaving Meaning and The Beggar; he would also join as a touring member.

== Music for film and television ==
- Sleeping Beauty – Directed by Julia Leigh
- Super Dark Times – Directed by Kevin Phillips
- Fortitude – Directed by Kieron Hawkes
- Dark – Directed by Baran Bo Odar
- Raised By Wolves – Directed by Ridley Scott
- What Remains – Directed by Ran Huang
- 1899 – Directed by Baran Bo Odar
- Palestine '36 - Directed by Annemarie Jacir

== Opera ==
- The Wasp Factory (2013)
- The Murder of Halit Yozgat (2020)

== Discography ==
=== Albums ===
- Steel Wound (2003/re-issue 2007/2012) – Room40
- Theory of Machines (2007) – Bedroom Community
- By the Throat (2009) – Bedroom Community
- Aurora (2014) – Mute Records / Bedroom Community
- The Centre Cannot Hold (2017) – Mute Records
- Scope Neglect (2024) – Mute Records
- Under Certain Light and Atmospheric Conditions (2025) – Mute Records

=== EPs and other ===
- Music for Sad Children (2001) – independent
- Variant (2014) – Bedroom Community
- Threshold of Faith (2017) – Mute Records
- All That You Love Will Be Eviscerated (2018) – Mute Records

=== Soundtracks ===
- The Invisibles (2010) – for Amnesty International
- FAR (2013) – independent
- Sleeping Beauty (2013) – independent – soundtrack for Julia Leigh's movie of the same name.
- Black Marrow (2013) – independent
- Tom Clancy's Siege (Original Game Soundtrack) (with Paul Haslinger) (2015) – Ubisoft Music
- The Wasp Factory (2016) – Bedroom Community
- Super Dark Times (2017) – Super Dark Times Soundtrack – soundtrack for Kevin Phillips's film of the same name
- Catastrophic Deliquescence, Music From Fortitude (2015-2018) – Mute Records – soundtrack for Fortitude (TV series)
- Dark – Netflix series Dark Cycle 1 Soundtrack (2019) – Invada Records
- Dark – Netflix series Dark Cycle 2 Soundtrack (2019) – Invada Records
- Dark – Netflix series Dark Cycle 3 Soundtrack (2020) – Invada Records
- Broken Spectre (2022) – The Vinyl Factory
- 1899 (Original Music From The Netflix Series) (2022) – Invada
- Palestine '36 (Original Score) (2026) - Invada Records

=== Collaborations ===
- School of Emotional Engineering - School of Emotional Engineering (2004) – Architecture
- Sólaris (with Daníel Bjarnason) (2011) – Bedroom Community
- Francesco Fabris & Ben Frost – Vakning (2023) – Room40
- Ben Frost & Francesco Fabris – Meradalir (2023) – Room40

== See also ==
- List of ambient music artists
