= Aurora (Ben Frost album) =

Studio album by Ben Frost
- Released: 26 May 2014
- Genre: Experimental; ambient; noise
- Length: 40:25
- Label: Bedroom Community
- Producer: Ben Frost; Daniel Rejmer; Paul Corley; Valgeir Sigurðsson; Lawrence English; Tim Hecker

Ben Frost chronology
By The Throat (2009)	Aurora (2014)

Aurora is the fourth studio album by Australian producer Ben Frost. It was released on 26 May 2014 by Bedroom Community. The album received acclaim from music critics and was listed by many publications as one of the best albums of the year. Several of its tracks were remixed and released in the 2014 V A R I A N T EP.

== Critical reception ==
Professional ratings
Aggregate scores
Source	Rating
AnyDecentMusic?	8.0/10
Metacritic	84/100
Review scores
Source	Rating
AllMusic	5/5 stars
Clash	8/10
Exclaim!	8/10
Fact	4/5
Pitchfork	8.5/10
PopMatters	8/10
Q	4/5 stars
Resident Advisor	4.5/5
Rolling Stone	3.5/5 stars
Uncut	7/10

=== Accolades ===
Publication/Author	Country	Accolade	Year	Rank
AllMusic	United States	Best of 2014	2014	*
Clash	United Kingdom	40 Albums Of 2014	2014	11
Drowned in Sound	United Kingdom	Favorite 50 Albums of 2014	2014	35
Exclaim!	Canada	Top 10 Dance & Electronic	2014	6
musicOMH	United Kingdom	Top 100 Albums Of 2014	2014	21
Pitchfork	United States	The 50 Best Albums of 2014	2014	50
PopMatters	International	The Best Albums of 2014	2014	17
Spin	United States	The 50 Best Albums of 2014	2014	48
Sputnikmusic	International	Staff's Top 50 Albums of 2014	2014	14
* denotes an unordered list.

== Track listing ==
All tracks are written by Ben Frost

Of Heat
No.	Title	Length
1.	"Flex"	2:50
2.	"Nolan"	6:58
3.	"The Teeth Behind Kisses"	3:13

Of Light
No.	Title	Length
4.	"Secant"	4:55
5.	"Diphenyl Oxalate"	1:31
6.	"Venter"	6:45

Of the Sun
No.	Title	Length
7.	"No Sorrowing"	4:27
8.	"Sola Fide"	6:27
9.	"A Single Point of Blinding Light"	3:18
Total length:		40:21

Japanese CD bonus track
No.	Title	Length
10.	"Rare Decay"	6:35
Total length:		46:56

== Charts ==
Chart (2014)	Peak position
Belgian Albums (Ultratop Flanders)	116
Belgian Albums (Ultratop Wallonia)	151
