= Broken Dimanche Press =

German publisher and art platform

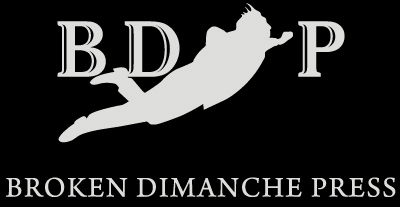
- Founded: 2009
- Founder: John Holten and Line Madsen Simenstad
- Country of origin: Germany
- Headquarters location: Berlin
- Distribution: Vice Versa Distribution (Germany); Turnaround Publishing Services (UK); RAM Publications (US)
- Publication types: Books
- Nonfiction topics: Art
- Official website: www.brokendimanche.eu

Broken Dimanche Press (BDP) is an international publisher and art platform founded by John Holten and Line Madsen Simenstad in 2009 in Berlin.

== History ==
The name of the press was inspired by Yves Klein's Dimanche-Le Journal d’un Seul Jour (Sunday- The One-day Newspaper), a one-day newspaper that he published and distributed on newsstands. Broken Dimanche Press is a European press interested in all aspects of books within the wider discourses of contemporary art and politics. Founded in Berlin in 2009 by John Holten and Line Madsen Simenstad, BDP has executed many book projects, exhibition, reading series and interventions across Europe.

BDP has a staff of three, including academic Ida Bencke, and works in ongoing collaboration with FUK Graphic Design Studio. It mainly publishes experimental literature and contemporary art. More recently, it has branched out into arranging exhibitions within the domain of contemporary art book publishing. It has been based in Berlin since 2008 but has also been active across Europe, notably in Milan, Oslo and Copenhagen. In 2013 there was a Tour BDP which saw events and readings being organised across Europe.

== Projects of BDP ==
=== Büro BDP exhibition and event programme ===
Büro BDP is what BDP calls a multidisciplinary hybrid: office, creative agency, exhibition space, book showroom, archive for artists books and reading room, exploring the radical potentialities of an expanded notion of The Book in the contemporary age. Taking its cue from the initial impulse of Broken Dimanche Press – exploring the border between literature and contemporary art practice – the focus is on translation, editions, print solutions and the physical meeting of the core agents in book production: writers, artist, designers, editors, printers, distributors, booksellers and readers. It is furnished with a bespoke modular desk and display unit created by Canadian designer Leanne MacKay and over 50m2 of gallery and office space. Until 2024, it was located on Mareschstraße (Rixdorf) in Berlin's Neukölln quarter.

=== Para-poetics ===
In 2014, building on the many aspects of the body and the work of literature in a post-human form, BDP editor Ida Bencke came up with the working title Para-Poetics to capture a new poetic aesthetic. "By exploring a literature beyond the human, we wish to challenge the humanistic narrative of Man as the sole animal who has language. Not merely a question of the 'posthuman' – next step on the ladder of continuous progression – we want to confront narratives of mastery and expansion by probing around, before, after and beyond the category of the human. Asking what other possibilities can be afforded to us on the verge of environmental catastrophes? How do we speculate and engage in parallel vocabularies? How do we participate in narrations of worlds inhabited by something other than Man – the manifestation of a Western Logos - while not giving entirely up on the human. With experiments that tend towards asemic writing practices and eccentric narrative vantage points, we want to challenge the ideas of what it means to signify, in what manner significations can manifest themselves, and what promises for our relations to the Others a poetry in an expanded transhuman field might hold. Parapoetic ventures into sign systems that are – quite literally – unheard of."

=== Self-publishing archive ===
BDP started an archive to better facilitate the growing scene of self-published artist books and publications. It works on a consignment basis and is semi-public, intended as a public resource. It also includes talks and workshops.

=== The Kakofonie ===
The Kakofonie was inspired by the journals of the avant garde movements of the early 20th century and was intended by the editors to be changing in form and content with each issue, often not translating everything and looking at questions of distribution in the choice of form and appearance. Past issues have included: a beer, a flyer, a poster, a bookmark, a magazine cover and a sound issue. There are ten issues planned.

== Publications ==
- I'm Never Indifferent, Lise Harlev, 2016
- Notations, Rebecca Partridge, 2014
- Frames of Reference, Sam Smith, 2014
- The Black Signs, Lars Finborud, 2014
- Oblio, Edited by Elisa Rusca Texts by Prof. Dr. Jean-François Démonet, Rebecca Howard, Charlotte Lalou Rousseau, Craig Schüftan, Vincent Surmont
- Artwork by Anne Duk Hee Jordan, Jacob Kirkegaard, Luke Munn, Virginie Rebetez and Sam Smith, 2014
- Unbreaken, as part of the Affect Residency Programme, Agora, 2014
- Nuances of No, Hanne Lippard, 2013
- How a mosquito operates, Mahony, 2013
- Études des Gottnarrenmaschinen, Shane Andreson, 2012
- Soap Poetry/Sæbepoesi, Morten Søndergaard
- Un Coup de 3 Dé, Brian Larosche
- My Favourite Pyramid, Kandis Williams and David Dagen
- Wordpharmacy Poster, Special limited-edition poster designed by FUK Labs to mark the exhibition Wordpharmacy, 2012
- Wordpharmacy, Morten Søndergaard, 2012
- Mountainislandglaciar, Carlos Fernåndez-Pello, Javier Fresneda, Eduardo Hurtado, Regina de Miguel, Antonio R. Montesinos, Lorenzo Sandoval (Eds.)
- I, Coleoptile, Ann Cotten and Kerstin Cmelka, 2010
- The Readymades, John Holten
- You Are Here, Ann Cotten / Anna Bro / Agnieszka Drotkiewicz / Martin John Callanan / Volha Martynenka / Francesca Musiani / Christophe Van Gerrewey /Urszula Wozniak, 2009
- Expanded Architecture, Sarah Breen Lovett and Lee Stickells (editors)
- Prophecy by Evan Swisher, Exhibition catalogue
- (…), Gender Art Net, Claire L. Evans, Regina de Miguel, Paloma Polo and Teresa Solar, Exhibition catalogue,
- The Kakofonie 001, Andrea Bedorin (IT) / Andrea DeAngelis (US) / John Lalor (IRE & FR) / Patrick O Beirne (GER) / Luke Sheehan (IRE) / Charlie Stadtlander (US) / Simon Stranger & Susanne Krövel (NOR) / Christian Ward (UK) / Karl Whitney (IRE)
- The Kakofonie 002, Pia Eikaas (NO), Siggi Eggertsson (IS), Alain Badiou (FR), Paal Bjelke Andersen (NO), Jennifer Allen (UK), Alan Jude Moore (IRE), Agnieszka Roguski (GER), Will Burns (UK), Eirik Sørdal (IS), Darko Dragicevic (SER), Djordje Bojic (SER)
- The Kakofonie 003, Siouxzi Mernagh / Matthew MacKisack / Lauren Moffatt / Gabi Schaffner / Kerstin Cmelka / Gerard Carson / Richard Mosse / Pauline Carnier Jardin / Anna Niedhart
- The Kakofonie 004, Jota Castro and Cia Rinne
- The Kakofonie 006, The brown paper bag issue, Theis Ørntoft (Text), Francisco Queimadela (Image)

== Achievements ==
- Charlemagne Youth Prize (won) - You Are Here
