= John Holten =

Irish-born novelist, artist, and curator

John Holten is an Irish-born novelist, artist, and curator He is a co-founder and Editor-in-Chief of Berlin-based publishing company Broken Dimanche Press. He is a curator at NR / Projects, in Berlin Mitte. Since autumn 2015 Holten is a columnist for the Contemporary Food Lab.

== The Readymades and The LGB Group ==
The LGB Group, the Eastern European avantgarde art collective Holten helped to revive in The Readymades (with Serbian artist and filmmaker Darko Dragicevic), enjoyed exhibitions in many cities as well as being included in The Armory Show, New York in 2012. Holten discussed the group with philosopher Aengus Woods in an artwork that was exhibited at David Zwirner Gallery, New York, in the summer of 2012, infiltrating the prestigious gallery's inventory.

The writer and critic Travis Jeppesen wrote of the project in Art in America:

"Set in a Europe of not too long ago, covering the period that arguably constitutes the formation of our 21st-century milieu (from the 1990s Balkan Wars up to the mid-aughts), The Readymades documents a fictional network of Serbian artists known as the LGB Group (after the surnames of its three core members). Though vaguely reminiscent of real-life collectives from the region such as Irwin/NSK, the OHO Group—and much like an update of fellow Balkanite Tristan Tzara and his Dada cronies—Holten’s artists find themselves caught in the changing tide of history and war."

Contemporary Irish novelist Rob Doyle said 'The Readymades, John Holten‘s 2011 debut novel, was a marvel. A Bolañoesque, avant-garde page-turner, it trained a breezily pan-European sensibility on the story of a shadowy Serbian art collective at large in Paris, Vienna and Berlin. Alongside the book’s heady inventiveness, there were ample doses of sex, drugs and alcohol, and exhilarating, wistful evocations of being young, broke and brilliant in post-Cold War Europe...The Readymades was largely ignored by the literary mainstream. One of the most remarkable novels of recent years, it has been read by relatively few people."

The novel subsequently sold out.

== Collaborations ==
He has written many texts in collaboration with artists such as Natalie Czech, Mahony, Lorenzo Sandoval and Ari Benjamin Meyers amongst others.

In 2012 Holten travelled to the Democratic Republic of Congo with Richard Mosse as production assistant on The Enclave, which represented Ireland at the Venice Biennale in 2013. He subsequently edited A Supplement To The Enclave which was published on the occasion of Mosse's winning exhibition at the Deutsche Börse Photography Prize in London.

== Bibliography ==
=== Novels ===
- The Readymades (2011)
- Oslo, Norway (2015)

=== Short Stories in Artist Books ===
- 'One Story Multiple Events' in how a mosquito operates by Mahony (ISBN 978-3-943196-24-5)
- 'Paris is a Forest, Rome is a Relic' in Anecdotal by Jani Ruscica (ISBN 978-952-99335-7-0)
