= By the Throat (Ben Frost album) =

Studio album by Ben Frost
- Released: October 19, 2009
- Genre: Experimental; industrial; noise
- Length: 45:53; 61:23 (w/ bonus tracks)
- Label: Bedroom Community
- Producer: Ben Frost

Ben Frost chronology
Theory of Machines (2007)	By the Throat (2009)	Aurora (2014)

By the Throat is the second studio album by experimental and drone musician Ben Frost.

== Reception ==
Professional ratings
Aggregate scores
Source	Rating
Metacritic	82/100
Review scores
Source	Rating
AllMusic	4/5 stars
Cokemachineglow	74%
Drowned in Sound	8/10
Fact	4/5 stars
NME	8/10
Pitchfork	8.4/10
PopMatters	7/10
Record Collector	4/5 stars
Resident Advisor	4/5
The 405	10/10

Electronic musician Tim Hecker named By the Throat as his favorite album of 2009. Resident Advisor—an online magazine with a focus on electronic music—named By the Throat as the 16th best album of 2009.

== Track listing ==
All tracks are written by Ben Frost

No.	Title	Length
1.	"Killshot"	6:11
2.	"The Carpathians"	2:57
3.	"Ó God Protect Me"	2:55
4.	"Híbakúsja"	7:25
5.	"Untitled Transient"	0:50
6.	"Peter Venkman Part I"	4:29
7.	"Peter Venkman Part II"	5:05
8.	"Leo Needs a New Pair of Shoes"	7:04
9.	"Through the Glass of the Roof"	1:35
10.	"Through the Roof of Your Mouth"	4:34
11.	"Through the Mouth of Your Eye"	2:48

Bonus tracks
No.	Title	Length
12.	"Studies for Michael Gira"	8:50
13.	"Theory of Machines (Reprise)"	6:40
