= Ham Serunjogi =

Ugandan businessman

Ham Serunjogi (born December 2, 1993) is a Ugandan businessman who is the co-founder and chief executive officer (CEO) of Chipper Cash, a financial technology company that offers cross-border payment services in Africa.

== Early life and education ==
Serunjogi was born and raised in Uganda. He attended the Aga Khan Academy in Mombasa, Kenya, where he served as president of the Student Representative Council. During this time, he also represented Uganda in swimming at the 2010 Youth Olympic Games in Singapore. After completing his secondary education, Serunjogi received a scholarship to study in the United States. He attended Grinnell College in Iowa, where he earned a bachelor of arts degree in Economics in 2016. While at Grinnell, he was an active member of the swim team and co-developed an app that allowed users to send short, encrypted voice recordings.

== Career ==
After graduating, Serunjogi worked at Meta's office in Dublin, Ireland. In 2018, he co-founded Chipper Cash with Maijid Moujaled, whom he had met at Grinnell College, a platform which provides cross-border payment services across Africa. The platform expanded its operations to several countries, including Nigeria, Ghana, Rwanda, Uganda and United States.

In 2023, Serunjogi was appointed as Inaugural Member of President Biden’s Advisory Council on African Diaspora Engagement in the United States.

=== Chipper Cash ===
Serunjogi’s startup Chipper Cash attracted investment from venture capital firms. In 2020, it raised $13.8 million in Series A funding round led by Deciens Capital. The company raised $30 million in a Series B funding round led by Ribbit Capital, with participation from Bezos Expeditions, the personal venture capital fund of Amazon founder Jeff Bezos. This investment was reported as Bezos's first significant investment in an African startup. By 2021, Chipper Cash secured an additional $100 million in a Series C round led by SVB Capital. The company raised over $300 million in funding from investors bringing its valuation to over $1 billion and achieving unicorn status.

== Recognition ==
In 2023, Serunjogi was included in Forbes' "30 Under 30" list in finance category.

== See also ==
- Ugandan Americans
