= Isaya Kisekka =

African American agricultural engineer

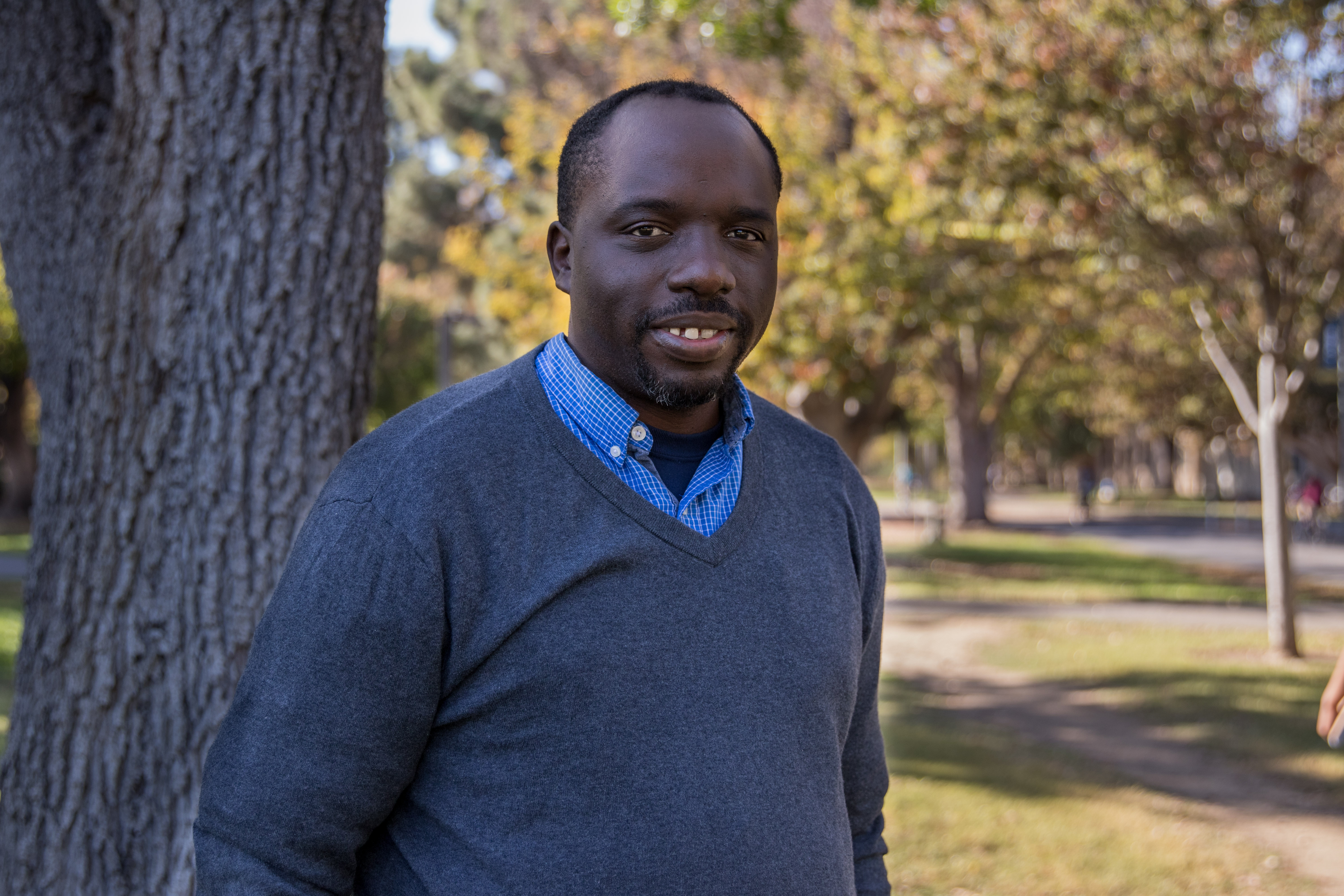
- Education: Makerere University; University of Florida
- Scientific career
- Workplaces: University of California, Davis
- Thesis: Modeling Influences Of Canal Stage Raises On Groundwater And Soil Water In The C-111 Basin Of South Florida (2013)

Isaya Kisekka is a Ugandan American agricultural engineer who is a professor at University of California, Davis. His research looks to make farmers more productive, efficient, sustainable and profitable. He has pioneered the development of precision irrigation systems. His work has been recognized by the American Society of Agricultural and Biological Engineers and the National Institute of Food and Agriculture.

== Early life and education ==
Kisekka was born in Kampala, Uganda. He studied agricultural engineering at Makerere University. He moved to the United States for graduate studies, joining the University of Florida. His masters explored evapotranspiration irrigation for tropical fruit in Florida. The evapotranspiration approach looks to apply the correct amount of water at the perfect time, then maintain soil water content in an idea range. His doctorate explored the modeling of groundwater and surface water interactions in South Florida. He developed the concepts into an open access website, sharing data on how to grow crops with less groundwater. These technologies were deployed on pistachio orchids near Fresno and Davis, striking a balance between latent heat, evapotranspiration and carbon sequestration. He has argued that challenges of deploying remote sensors is that no one agrees on standards or numbers, whilst ground-based measurements are expensive.

== Research career ==
Kisekka develops water management strategies and technologies to help farmers become more profitable and productive. He has developed precision irrigation systems (including sustainable microirrigation systems and low-pressure sprinkler systems) for the production of almonds, alfalfa, corn, processing tomatoes, pistachios, sorghum etc. He has developed integrated sensing systems for soil and plant water status to optimize irrigation, nitrogen, and salinity. Groundwater is increasingly important during heat stress and multi-year droughts. Kisekka looks to build links between policymakers, researchers, farmers and the general public about water demand management.

In 2022, Kisekka was awarded $10m from the United States Department of Agriculture National Institute of Food and Agriculture to improve agriculture and groundwater quality in the Southwestern United States. The funding, which recognizes the changing climate in Southwest America, allows Kisekka to develop tools for water management at farm and basin scales and contribute to the Sustainable Groundwater Management Act. Part of his program looks to educate people from elementary school up to communicate the importance of water in agriculture. He wants to help farmers grow food in California without drying out their groundwater aquifers.

Alongside groundwater, Kisekka has monitored how climate-driven extreme weather events impact the toxicity of drinking water.

In 2020, Kisekka was honored by the Irrigation Association with the Excellence in Education Award. He was awarded the 2022 Netafim Award for Advancements in Micro-irrigation from the American Society of Agricultural and Biological Engineers.

== Selected publications ==
- A. Araya; G. Hoogenboom; E. Luedeling; Kiros M. Hadgu; Isaya Kisekka; Lucieta G. Martorano (December 2015). "Assessment of maize growth and yield using crop models under present and future climate in southwestern Ethiopia". Agricultural and Forest Meteorology. 214–215: 252–265. doi:10.1016/j.agrformet.2015.08.259. ISSN 0168-1923. Wikidata Q117014072.
- A. Araya; Isaya Kisekka; Prasanna H. Gowda; P.V. Vara Prasad (January 2017). "Evaluation of water-limited cropping systems in a semi-arid climate using DSSAT-CSM". Agricultural Systems. 150: 86–98. doi:10.1016/j.agsy.2016.10.007. ISSN 0308-521X. Wikidata Q117014067.
- A. Araya; I. Kisekka; X. Lin; P.V. Vara Prasad; P.H. Gowda; C. Rice; A. Andales (2017). "Evaluating the impact of future climate change on irrigated maize production in Kansas". Climate Risk Management. 17: 139–154. doi:10.1016/j.crm.2017.08.001. ISSN 2212-0963. Wikidata Q117014043.
