= Scope Neglect (album) =

Studio album by Ben Frost
- Released: 1 March 2024
- Studio: Candybomber, Berlin Tempelhof Airport
- Length: 38:45
- Label: Mute
- Producer: Ben Frost

Ben Frost chronology
| The Centre Cannot Hold (2017) | Scope Neglect (2024) |

Singles from Scope Neglect
- 1. "Turning the Prism" Released: 15 November 2023; 2. "The River of Light and Radiation" Released: 11 January 2024; 3. "Chimera" Released: 15 February 2024

Scope Neglect is the sixth studio album by Australian-Icelandic musician Ben Frost. It was released on 1 March 2024 through Mute Records, as his first studio offering in seven years, following The Centre Cannot Hold (2017). It features collaborations from Greg Kubacki of Car Bomb and Liam Andrews of My Disco.

== Background and singles ==
Scope Neglect was recorded at Candybomber Studios, located at Berlin Tempelhof Airport, together with engineer Ingo Krauss. Inspired by the approaches of Mark Hollis and Talk Talk, the recording process was met with the use of innovative recording techniques. Frost would reveal only parts of his arrangements to his collaborators and point their efforts into one direction, while continuing into another one. In the process, Frost created entire orchestrations with the intent to push dynamics into unpredictable territory. The album draws inspiration from "transcendental reveries" of "West Coast minimalists" and leans sonically more "into metal". In a press release, Scope Neglect was described as a "journey of contrasts, where raw power meets ethereal delicacy" that sees the musician venturing into "new sonic territories".

Frost previously tested out most of the material on the record during concerts in 2023 and 2024. On 15 November 2023, after years of collaborational ventures, Frost returned to solo endeavours by releasing the lead single "Turning the Prism". Dubbed a signature song of his, it showcases "his strong dynamic evolution in the realms of sound and artistry". The musician shared first details of Scope Neglect on 11 January 2024, alongside the release of the second single "The River of Light and Radiation". A third single, "Chimera", was released on 15 February.

== Critical reception ==
Professional ratings
Review scores
| Source | Rating |
|---|---|
| Pitchfork | 7.3/10 |

Philip Sherburne of Pitchfork wrote that Frost makes a "claustrophobic landscape out of chugging metal riffs" as the album "plays out like a loose theme and variations". Calling it "inscrutable", Sherburne also felt that "where even the most extreme metal typically conveys a feeling of exhilaration, Scope Neglect feels dour and cramped and weirdly enervating—a foul mood in a windowless room".

== Track listing ==
All tracks are written by Ben Frost.

Scope Neglect track listing
| No. | Title | Length |
|---|---|---|
| 1. | "Lamb Shift" | 2:30 |
| 2. | "Chimera" | 6:11 |
| 3. | "The River of Light and Radiation" | 4:50 |
| 4. | "_1993" | 2:50 |
| 5. | "Turning the Prism" | 6:18 |
| 6. | "Load Up on Guns, Bring Your Friends" | 3:15 |
| 7. | "Tritium Bath" | 7:18 |
| 8. | "Unreal in the Eyes of the Dead" | 5:33 |
| Total length: | | 38:45 |

== Personnel ==
- Liam Andrews – performance
- Carlos Boix – live production
- Paul Corley – additional production
- Lawrence English – additional production
- Form und Konzept – design
- Ben Frost – performance, production
- Tim Hecker – additional production
- Greg Kubacki – performance
- Christian Wright – mastering

== Charts ==
Chart performance for Scope Neglect
| Chart (2024) | Peak position |
|---|---|
| Australian Digital Albums (ARIA) | 19 |
| UK Album Downloads (OCC) | 92 |
