= Isolde Brielmaier =

Curator and Scholar from Seattle, Washington

- Born: 1971 (age 54–55); Seattle, Washington
- Education: Columbia University (PhD)
- Occupation: Curator

Isolde Brielmaier (born 1971) is an American curator and scholar working in New York City.

== Early life and education ==
Brielmaier was born in Seattle, Washington to Ugandan and Austrian parents who encouraged involvement in the arts. She studied ballet and modern dance, working as a dancer for many years. Brielmaier earned her Ph.D. in Art History and Critical Studies from Columbia University.

== Career ==
In addition to her work as an independent curator, Brielmaier has worked in senior positions at the Guggenheim, the SCAD Museum of Art, the Bronx Museum and most recently as Executive Director of Art, Culture and Community for Westfield. She teaches critical studies in NYU Tisch's photography department. Brielmaier is Guest Curator at the International Center of Photography in New York. In July 2021 Brielmaier was named the Deputy Director of the New Museum in New York City. Her position will begin on September 1, 2021.

== See also ==
- Ugandan Americans
