= East Africans in the United States =

United States residents or citizens of recent East African descent and heritage

East Africans in the United States are Americans with ancestry from East Africa. They include:

- Burundian Americans
- Kenyan Americans
- Rwandan Americans
- South Sudanese Americans
- Tanzanian Americans
- Ugandan Americans

== See also ==
- African Great Lakes
- East Africa
