= The Centre Cannot Hold (album) =

Studio album by Ben Frost
- Released: 29 September 2017
- Genre: Electronic; experimental
- Length: 49:56
- Label: Mute
- Producer: Steve Albini

Ben Frost chronology
Music From Fortitude (2017)	The Centre Cannot Hold (2017)	Scope Neglect (2024)

Professional ratings
Aggregate scores
Source	Rating
Metacritic	75/100
Review scores
Source	Rating
AllMusic	4/5 stars
Drowned in Sound	8/10
Exclaim!	8/10
Pitchfork	7.8/10
PopMatters	8/10

The Centre Cannot Hold is the fifth studio album by Australian musician Ben Frost. It was released on 29 September 2017 through Mute Records.

== Accolades ==
Publication	Accolade	Rank	Ref.
Pitchfork	Top 20 Experimental Albums of 2017	14	

== Track listing ==
No.	Title	Length
1.	"Threshold of Faith"	6:35
2.	"A Sharp Blow in Passing"	5:13
3.	"Trauma Theory"	4:42
4.	"A Single Hellfire Missile Costs $100,000"	0:12
5.	"Eurydice's Heel"	5:07
6.	"Meg Ryan Eyez"	2:50
7.	"Ionia"	6:48
8.	"Healthcare"	3:32
9.	"All That You Love Will Be Eviscerated"	8:15
10.	"Entropy in Blue"	6:42
