= Tanzanian Americans =

Americans of Tanzanian birth or descent

Total population
- 2,921 (ancestry and ethnic origin. 2000 US Census); Estimated 40,420 (Only born in Tanzania and emigrated to the United States, 2023 US Census)

Regions with significant populations
- Chicago metropolitan area, Milwaukee metropolitan area, New York, Massachusetts, Pennsylvania, Delaware, Maryland, Virginia, North Carolina, Kentucky, Georgia, Florida, Minnesota, Missouri, Iowa, Kansas, Alabama, Mississippi, Louisiana, Oklahoma, Texas, Washington, Oregon, Colorado, Utah and California

Languages
- American English; Swahili

Religion
- Christianity; Islam

Tanzanian Americans are Americans of Tanzanian descent. In the 2000 US Census, 2,921 people reported Tanzanian ancestry. To this figure must be added several groups, each numbering fewer than 300 people, who hailed from "Tanganyika" and "Zanzibar Islanders" descend. In 2023 were registered 40,420 Tanzanians living in United States (this figure excludes Americans descended from Tanzanians).

A drought in Tanzania during the early 1980s caused a worsening of economic conditions in the country and motivated some people to emigrate, arriving in the United States in appreciable numbers beginning in 1986 with the arrival of 370 Tanzanians.

== Demographics ==
Based on 2009-2011 data, 20,837 Tanzanians lived in the United States in these years. At this time, an estimated 15.2 percent (range of estimate: 11.5 to 18.9 percent) of Tanzanian Americans were 17 or younger. Their estimated median age was 37.8 (range of estimate: 35.8 to 39.8 years of age). Approximately 47.9 percent (range of estimate: 41.4 to 54.4 percent) of them had a least a bachelor's degree. An estimated 2.2 percent (range of estimate: 1.1 to 3.3 percent) of them were living outside the U. S. one year before. Of those born outside the U. S., an estimated 40.8 percent had become U. S. citizens. Of all Tanzanian Americans born outside the U. S., an estimated 47.0 percent (range of estimate: 41.8 to 52.2 percent) entered the country after 1999. Their estimated median household income was USD 67,327 (range of estimate: USD 59,861 to 74,793).

Although Tanzania belonged to United Kingdom, only the 16% of the Tanzanian population in United States had english as their native language, while 84.0% of the population had other languages as their native languages.

=== Tanzanian Americans in Chicago ===
Most Tanzanians who have arrived since 1986 have chosen to settle in Chicago. Many of them are students and professionals who came to the city to pursue an advanced degree or work for an employer that sponsored their entry into the United States. Some of the Tanzanians have returned to their home country a few years after arriving in the U. S.

=== Tanzanian Americans elsewhere in the United States ===
Tanzanian American associations in the United States include the Tanzanian American Association (Inc.) in Massachusetts and the Tanzania Association Of Wichita, Kansas.

== Notable people ==
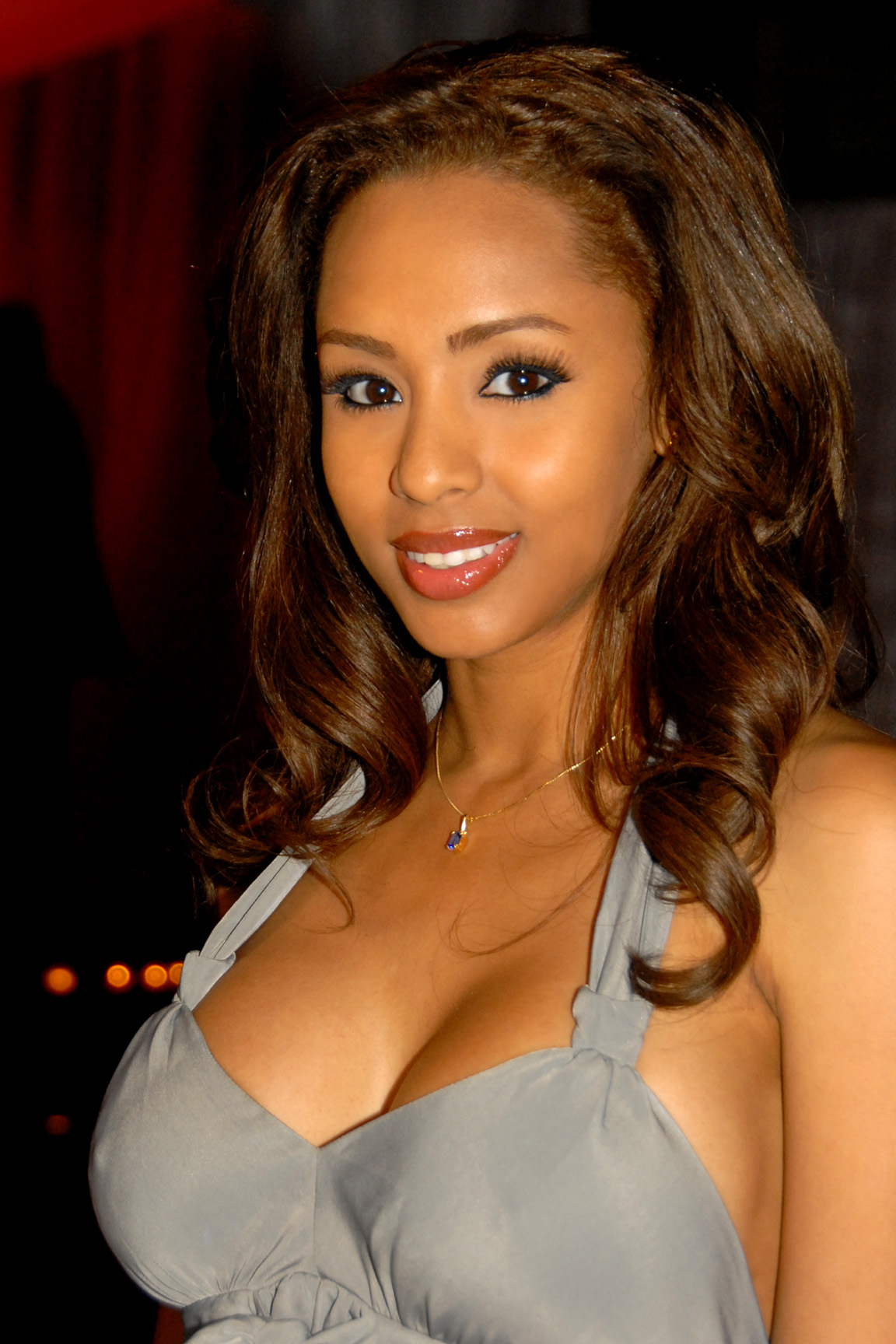
Ida Ljungqvist

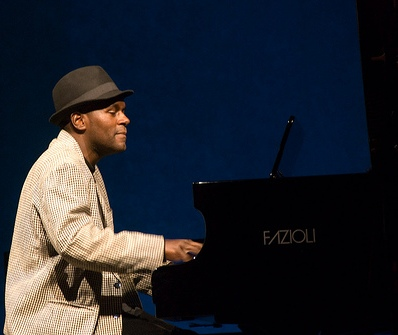
Harold O'Neal

- John Abraham, former mayor of Teaneck, New Jersey
- Ida Ljungqvist, international model
- Clea Koff, forensic anthropologist and author
- Vivek Kundra, former first chief information officer of the United States
- Harold O'Neal, composer
- Vanessa Mdee, Singer and song writer

== See also ==
- Southeast Africans in the United States
- Tanzanians in the United Kingdom
- Tanzania–United States relations
