= Tavia Nyong'o =

American historian (born 1974)

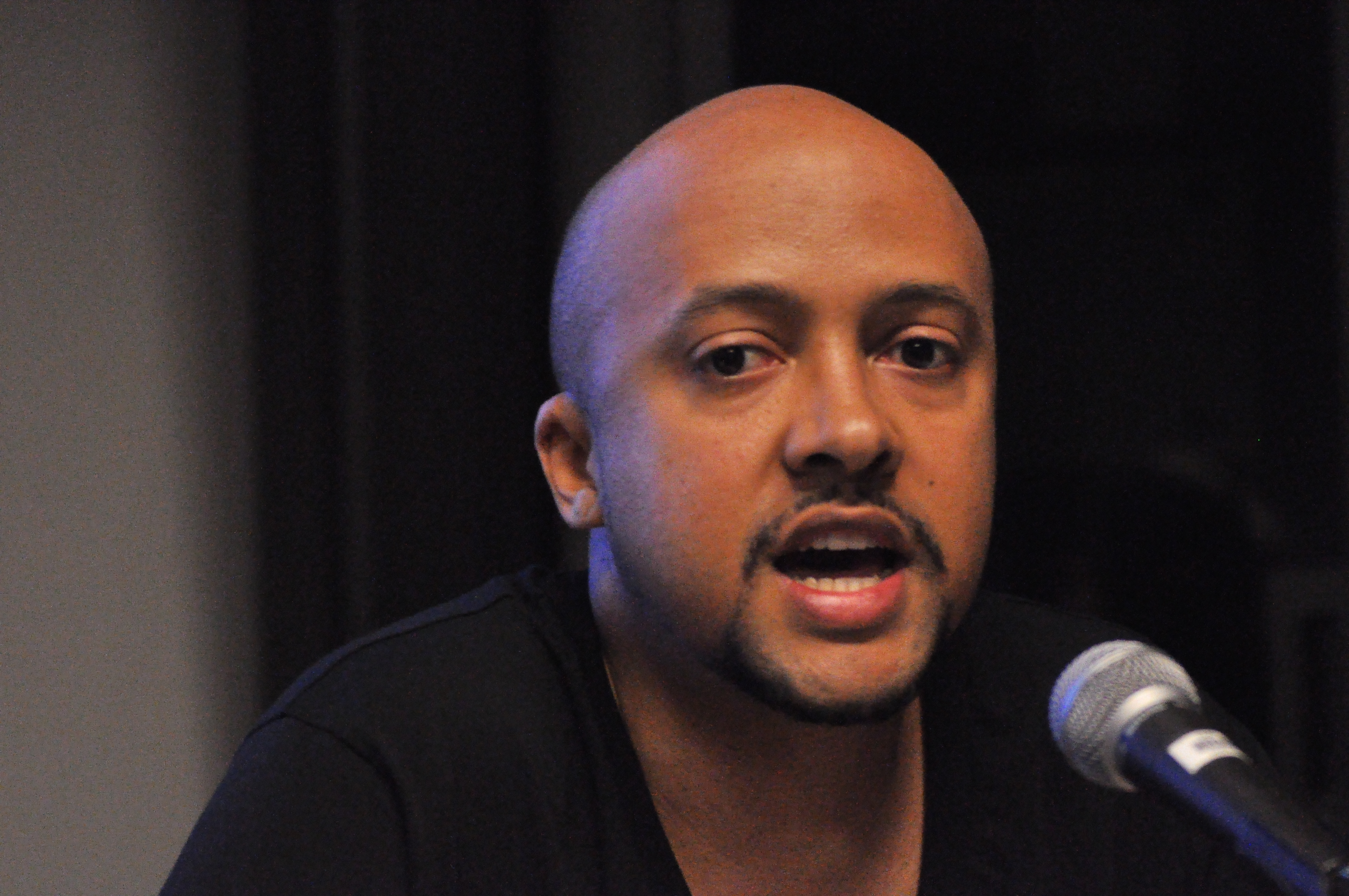
- Born: 1974 (age 51–52)
- Occupation: Academic
- Title: Professor of African American studies, American studies and Theater and Performance studies
- Relatives: Lupita Nyong'o (cousin)

Academic background
- Education: Wesleyan University; Yale University

Tavia Nyong'o (born 1974) is an American critic and scholar of art and performance. He is William Lampson professor of African American studies, American studies and theater and performance studies at Yale University where he teaches courses on black diaspora performance, cultural studies, and critical and aesthetic theory.

== Education ==
Nyong'o received his B.A. from Wesleyan University. He then received a Marshall Scholarship to study at the University of Birmingham (England). In 2003, he received his PhD in American studies from Yale, where he studied under the mentorship of Paul Gilroy and Joseph Roach. Nyong'o was the 2004 runner-up for the Ralph Henry Gabriel Dissertation Award given by the American Studies Association annually for the best doctoral dissertation written in the field of American studies.

== Career ==
Nyong'o is professor of African American studies, American studies and theater and performance studies at Yale University where he teaches courses on black diaspora performance, cultural studies, social and critical theory. Prior to his appointment at Yale, Nyong'o taught in the Department of Performance Studies at New York University.

His book, The Amalgamation Waltz: Race, Performance, and the Ruses of Memory, is published by the University of Minnesota Press (2009), and won the Errol Hill Award.

In addition, Nyong'o has published articles in The Nation, n+1, the Yale Journal of Criticism, Social Text, Theatre Journal, and GLQ.

== Personal life ==
Nyong'o, who is of Luo heritage, was born in the Midwestern United States, and raised there and in Kenya. He is a cousin of Academy Award winning actress Lupita Nyong'o.
