= List of foreign-born United States politicians =

This is a list of United States politicians who were born outside the present-day United States, its territories (the District of Columbia, Puerto Rico, Guam, the U.S. Virgin Islands, the Commonwealth of the Northern Mariana Islands, and American Samoa), and its outlying possessions. This list does not include politicians from the Philippines (such as resident commissioners of the Philippines), which was held under various forms of government as an American territory from 1898 to 1946 before becoming a sovereign country.

United States citizenship is required to serve in Congress, as president or vice president, and in most state offices. The president and the vice president must additionally be a 'natural-born citizen'. Foreign-born politicians may gain U.S. citizenship by means of birth (if one or both of their parents were citizens who met the requirements to transmit citizenship at birth), derivation (if they acquired citizenship from their parents after birth but before the age of 18), or naturalization (if they acquired citizenship by fulfilling the requirements of the naturalization process as established in the Immigration and Nationality Act of 1952).

In the 119th United States Congress (2025–2027), 19 voting members are foreign‑born naturalized citizens—17 in the House of Representatives and 2 in the Senate—representing 4% of total voting membership. An additional four senators and several representatives were born abroad to American parents and are not included in that count. When members with at least one immigrant parent are included, 80 voting members (roughly 15% of Congress) are immigrants or the children of immigrants.

== Incumbents ==
=== Members of Congress ===
==== Senators ====
| Senator | Country/place of birth | Citizenship by | Party | Serving since | Position(s) held |
|---|---|---|---|---|---|
| Michael Bennet | India | Birth | Democratic | 2009 | U.S. Senator from Colorado |
| Ted Cruz | Canada | Birth | Republican | 2013 | U.S. Senator from Texas |
| Tammy Duckworth | Thailand | Birth | Democratic | 2017 | U.S. Senator from Illinois |
| Mazie Hirono | Japan | Naturalization | Democratic | 2013 | U.S. Senator from Hawaii |
| Bernie Moreno | Colombia | Naturalization | Republican | 2025 | U.S. Senator from Ohio |
| Chris Van Hollen | Pakistan | Birth | Democratic | 2017 | U.S. Senator from Maryland |

==== Representatives ====
| Representative | Country/place of birth | Citizenship by | Party | Serving since | Position held |
|---|---|---|---|---|---|
| Becca Balint | West Germany | Birth | Democratic | 2023 | U.S. Representative from Vermont |
| Don Beyer | Trieste | Birth | Democratic | 2015 | U.S. Representative from Virginia |
| Salud Carbajal | Mexico | Naturalization | Democratic | 2017 | U.S. Representative from California |
| Sean Casten | Ireland | Birth | Democratic | 2019 | U.S. Representative from Illinois |
| Juan Ciscomani | Mexico | Naturalization | Republican | 2023 | U.S. Representative from Arizona |
| Andrew Clyde | Canada | Birth | Republican | 2021 | U.S. Representative from Georgia |
| Dan Crenshaw | Scotland | Birth | Republican | 2019 | U.S. Representative from Texas |
| Sharice Davids | West Germany | Birth | Democratic | 2019 | U.S. Representative from Kansas |
| Diana DeGette | Japan | Birth | Democratic | 1997 | U.S. Representative from Colorado |
| Adriano Espaillat | Dominican Republic | Naturalization | Democratic | 2017 | U.S. Representative from New York |
| Jesús "Chuy" García | Mexico | Naturalization | Democratic | 2019 | U.S. Representative from Illinois |
| Robert Garcia | Peru | Naturalization | Democratic | 2023 | U.S. Representative from California |
| Carlos A. Giménez | Cuba | Naturalization | Republican | 2021 | U.S. Representative from Florida |
| Jim Himes | Peru | Birth | Democratic | 2009 | U.S. Representative from Connecticut |
| Pramila Jayapal | India | Naturalization | Democratic | 2017 | U.S. Representative from Washington |
| Young Kim | South Korea | Naturalization | Republican | 2021 | U.S. Representative from California |
| Raja Krishnamoorthi | India | Naturalization | Democratic | 2017 | U.S. Representative from Illinois |
| Ted Lieu | Taiwan | Naturalization | Democratic | 2015 | U.S. Representative from California |
| Ilhan Omar | Somalia | Derivation | Democratic | 2019 | U.S. Representative from Minnesota |
| David Rouzer | West Germany | Birth | Republican | 2015 | U.S. Representative from North Carolina |
| Raul Ruiz | Mexico | Derivation | Democratic | 2013 | U.S. Representative from California |
| Victoria Spartz | Ukrainian SSR | Naturalization | Republican | 2021 | U.S. Representative from Indiana |
| Marilyn Strickland | South Korea | Birth | Democratic | 2021 | U.S. Representative from Washington |
| Shri Thanedar | India | Naturalization | Democratic | 2023 | U.S. Representative from Michigan |
| Norma J. Torres | Guatemala | Naturalization | Democratic | 2015 | U.S. Representative from California |
| Eugene Vindman | Ukrainian SSR | Naturalization | Democratic | 2025 | U.S. Representative from Virginia |

=== Cabinet members ===
| Cabinet member | Place of birth | Citizenship by | Party | Positions held |

=== Governors ===
| Governor | Place of birth | Citizenship by | Party | Serving since | Position(s) held |
|---|---|---|---|---|---|
| Joe Lombardo | Japan | Birth | Republican | 2023 | Sheriff of Clark County and Governor of Nevada |

=== Statewide officials ===
| Official | Country/place of birth | Citizenship by | Party | Position(s) held |
|---|---|---|---|---|
| Rob Bonta | Philippines | Birth | Democratic | Attorney General of California |
| Ghazala Hashmi | India | Naturalization | Democratic | Lieutenant Governor of Virginia |
| Deidre Henderson | Netherlands | Birth | Republican | Lieutenant Governor of Utah |
| Tom Horne | Canada | Naturalization | Republican | Superintendent of Public Instruction of Arizona |
| Rachel Hunt | Nepal | Birth | Democratic | Lieutenant Governor of North Carolina |
| John F. King | Mexico | Birth | Republican | Insurance Commissioner of Georgia |
| Nancy Landry | Japan | Birth | Republican | Secretary of State of Louisiana |
| Sylvia Luke | South Korea | Naturalization | Democratic | Lieutenant Governor of Hawaii |
| Vivek Malek | India | Naturalization | Republican | State Treasurer of Missouri |
| Sabina Matos | Dominican Republic | Naturalization | Democratic | Lieutenant Governor of Rhode Island |
| Aruna Miller | India | Naturalization | Democratic | Lieutenant Governor of Maryland |
| Diego Morales | Guatemala | Naturalization | Republican | Secretary of State of Indiana |
| Tregenza Roach | Saint Christopher-Nevis-Anguilla | Unknown | Democratic | Lieutenant Governor of the United States Virgin Islands |

=== State executive board members ===
| Board member | Place of birth | Citizenship by | Party | Positions held |
|---|---|---|---|---|
| Joseph Cao | South Vietnam | Unknown | Republican | Member of the Louisiana Board of Elementary and Secondary Education |
| Carlos D. Fernandez | Colombia | Unknown | Independent | Member of the Nevada Board of Regents |
| LJ Francis | Jamaica | Unknown | Republican | Member of the Texas State Board of Education |
| Cornelius JnBaptiste | Saint Lucia | Unknown | Democratic | Member of the U.S. Virgin Islands Board of Elections |
| Terrence T. Joseph | British Windward Islands | Unknown | Democratic | Member of the U.S. Virgin Islands Board of Education |
| Joseph Kerry | South Korea | Unknown | Republican | Member of the Utah State Board of Education |
| Anil Kumar | India | Unknown | Democratic | Member of the Wayne State University Board of Governors |
| Karen Liot Hill | France | Unknown | Democratic | Member of the Executive Council of New Hampshire |
| Arah C. Lockhart | British Leeward Islands | Unknown | Democratic | Member of the U.S. Virgin Islands Board of Education |
| Yazmin Navarro | Mexico | Unknown | Republican | Member of the Colorado State Board of Education |
| Sunny Reddy | India | Unknown | Republican | Member of the Wayne State University Board of Governors |

=== State judiciary officials ===
| Judge | Place of birth | Citizenship by | Position held |
|---|---|---|---|
| Riko E. Bishop | Japan | Unknown | Nebraska Court of Appeals Judge |
| Angela M. Eaves | Panama Canal Zone | Birth | Maryland Supreme Court Justice |
| Renatha Francis | Jamaica | Naturalization | Florida Supreme Court Justice |
| Robert Gusinsky | Latvian SSR | Naturalization | South Dakota Supreme Court Justice |
| Toby Hampson | England | Unknown | North Carolina Court of Appeals Judge |
| Kyle D. Hawkins | South Africa | Unknown | Texas Supreme Court Justice |
| Sueanna P. Johnson | South Korea | Unknown | Colorado Court of Appeals Judge |
| Teresa K. Kim-Tenorio | South Korea | Unknown | Northern Mariana Islands Superior Court Judge |
| Deborah A. Kunselman | West Germany | Birth | Pennsylvania Superior Court Judge |
| Jorge Labarga | Cuba | Naturalization | Florida Supreme Court Justice |
| Patricia Lee | South Korea | Birth | Nevada Supreme Court Justice |
| Christopher McDonald | Thailand | Birth | Iowa Supreme Court Justice |
| Melissa C. Meirink | Mexico | Unknown | Colorado Court of Appeals Judge |
| Raquel Montoya-Lewis | Spain | Birth | Washington Supreme Court Justice |
| Jude Pate | West Germany | Birth | Alaska Supreme Court Justice |
| James A. Rice | Canada | Birth | Montana Supreme Court Justice |
| Carlos Samour | El Salvador | Unknown | Colorado Supreme Court Justice |
| Helen Whitener | Trinidad and Tobago | Unknown | Washington Supreme Court Justice |
| David H. Yun | South Korea | Unknown | Colorado Court of Appeals Judge |

=== State legislators ===
| Legislator | Place of birth | Citizenship by | Party | Serving since | Position(s) held |
|---|---|---|---|---|---|
| Mana Abdi | Kenya | Unknown | Democratic | 2023 | Maine State Representative |
| Munira Abdullahi | Somalia | Unknown | Democratic | 2023 | Ohio State Representative |
| Gabriel Acevero | Trinidad and Tobago | Unknown | Democratic | 2019 | Maryland State Delegate |
| Stacy Jo Adams | West Germany | Birth | Republican | 2024 | Oklahoma State Representative |
| Solomon Adesanya | Nigeria | Unknown | Democratic | 2023 | Georgia State Representative |
| Segun Adeyina | Nigeria | Unknown | Democratic | 2023 | Georgia State Representative |
| George Alvarez | Dominican Republic | Unknown | Democratic | 2023 | New York State Assemblymember |
| Jose Alvarez | Cuba | Unknown | Democratic | 2024 | Florida State Representative |
| Alex Andrade | Cayman Islands | Birth | Republican | 2018 | Florida State Representative |
| Saud Anwar | Pakistan | Unknown | Democratic | 2019 | Connecticut State Senator |
| Wallace Aristide | Bahamas or Haiti | Unknown | Democratic | 2024 | Florida State Representative |
| Hector Arzeno | Argentina | Unknown | Democratic | 2023 | Connecticut State Representative |
| Dagmara Avelar | Ecuador | Unknown | Democratic | 2021 | Illinois State Representative |
| Rosy Bagolie | Dominican Republic | Unknown | Democratic | 2024 | New Jersey State Assemblymember |
| Al Barlas | Pakistan | Unknown | Republican | 2024 | New Jersey State Assemblymember |
| Webster Barnaby | England | Naturalization | Republican | 2020 | Florida State Representative |
| Carlos Barron | Mexico | Unknown | Republican | 2025 | Colorado State Representative |
| Luz Bay | Philippines | Naturalization | Democratic | 2022 | New Hampshire State Representative |
| Tim Bearden | Japan | Birth | Republican | 2024 | Georgia State Senator |
| Arlene Beckles | Barbados | Unknown | Democratic | 2025 | Georgia State Representative |
| Lex Berezhny | Ukrainian SSR | Unknown | Republican | 2020 | New Hampshire State Representative |
| Mack Bernard | Haiti | Unknown | Democratic | 2024 | Florida State Senator |
| Harry Bhandari | Nepal | Unknown | Democratic | 2019 | Maryland State Delegate |
| Salman Bhojani | Pakistan | Unknown | Democratic | 2023 | Texas State Representative |
| Nathan Biah | Liberia | Naturalization | Democratic | 2021 | Rhode Island State Representative |
| Walter Blackman | Portugal | Birth | Republican | 2025 | Arizona State Representative |
| Jennifer Bradley | Japan | Unknown | Republican | 2020 | Florida State Senator |
| Alec Brook-Krasny | Russian SFSR | Unknown | Republican | 2023 | New York State Assemblymember |
| Brienne Brown | West Germany | Birth | Democratic | 2025 | Wisconsin State Assemblymember |
| Colleen Burton | West Germany | Birth | Republican | 2022 | Florida State Senator |
| Angie Chen Button | Taiwan | Unknown | Republican | 2009 | Texas State Representative |
| Antonio Cabral | Azores | Unknown | Democratic | 1991 | Massachusetts State Representative |
| Katrina Callsen | West Germany | Birth | Democratic | 2024 | Virginia Delegate |
| Jessica Caloza | Philippines | Unknown | Democratic | 2024 | California State Assemblywoman |
| Shelly V. Calvo | Philippines | Unknown | Republican | 2025 | Guam Senator |
| Jose Cambrils | Cuba | Unknown | Republican | 2020 | New Hampshire State Representative |
| Tony Caplan | Venezuela | Birth | Democratic | 2020 | New Hampshire State Representative |
| Juan Carrillo | Mexico | Unknown | Democratic | 2022 | California State Assemblyman |
| Jose L. Castaneda | Mexico | Derivation | Republican | 2024 | North Dakota State Senator |
| Ethan Cha | Thailand | Unknown | Democratic | 2023 | Minnesota State Representative |
| Steve Chan | British Hong Kong | Unknown | Republican | 2025 | New York State Senator |
| Don Chapman | Japan | Birth | Republican | 2022 | South Carolina State Representative |
| Steven Choi | South Korea | Unknown | Republican | 2024 | California State Senator |
| Manoj Chourasia | India | Unknown | Democratic | 2024 | New Hampshire State Representative |
| Cordell Cleare | Bahamas | Unknown | Democratic | 2021 | New York State Senator |
| Merika Coleman | England | Unknown | Democratic | 2022 | Alabama State Senator |
| Alixon Collazos-Gill | Colombia | Unknown | Democratic | 2024 | New Jersey State Assemblymember |
| Maria Collett | Greece | Birth | Democratic | 2019 | Pennsylvania State Senator |
| Jeremy Cooney | India | Unknown | Democratic | 2021 | New York State Senator |
| Elias Coop-Gonzalez | Guatemala | Birth | Republican | 2022 | West Virginia Delegate |
| Julio Cortes | Mexico | Unknown | Democratic | 2023 | Washington State Representative |
| Catalina Cruz | Colombia | Unknown | Democratic | 2019 | New York State Assemblymember |
| Paul A. Cutler | England | Unknown | Republican | 2023 | Utah State Representative |
| Manny De Los Santos | Dominican Republic | Unknown | Democratic | 2022 | New York State Assemblymember |
| Deqa Dhalac | Somalia | Unknown | Democratic | 2022 | Maine State Representative |
| Manka Dhingra | India | Unknown | Democratic | 2017 | Washington State Senator |
| Grace Diaz | Dominican Republic | Naturalization | Democratic | 2005 | Rhode Island State Representative |
| Saira Draper | United Kingdom | Unknown | Democratic | 2023 | Georgia State Representative |
| Reuben D'Silva | India | Unknown | Democratic | 2022 | Nevada State Assemblymember |
| Lisa Dunkley | Jamaica | Unknown | Democratic | 2022 | Florida State Representative |
| Mark Edelson | South Africa | Unknown | Democratic | 2023 | Maryland State Delegate |
| Peter F. Egan | Ireland | Naturalization | Republican | 2024 | Louisiana State Representative |
| Arthur Ellis | Colony of Jamaica | Unknown | Democratic | 2019 | Maryland State Senator |
| Luz Escamilla | Mexico | Unknown | Democratic | 2009 | Utah State Senator |
| Dave Farnsworth | Mexico | Birth | Republican | 2023 | Arizona State Senator |
| Jake Fitisemanu | New Zealand | Birth | Democratic | 2025 | Utah State Representative |
| David Fraser-Hidalgo | Ecuador | Unknown | Democratic | 2013 | Maryland State Delegate |
| Nick Frentz | Japan | Birth | Democratic | 2023 | Minnesota State Senator |
| Rosanna Gabaldón | Bermuda | Birth | Democratic | 2021 | Arizona State Senator |
| Rey Garofano | Iran | Unknown | Democratic | 2022 | Vermont State Representative |
| Andrew Takuya Garrett | Japan | Unknown | Democratic | 2022 | Hawaii State Representative |
| Mary Ngwanda Georges | Democratic Republic of Congo | Unknown | Democratic | 2024 | New Hampshire State Representative |
| David Gomberg | England | Birth | Democratic | 2013 | Oregon State Representative |
| Mia Gregerson | Taiwan | Unknown | Democratic | 2013 | Washington State Representative |
| Ernesto Gonzalez | Cuba | Naturalization | Republican | 2024 | New Hampshire State Representative |
| Martine Gulick | Japan | Birth | Democratic | 2023 | Vermont State Senator |
| Yanira Gurrola | Mexico | Unknown | Democratic | 2023 | New Mexico State Representative |
| Elizabeth Guzmán | Peru | Unknown | Democratic | 2026 | Virginia Delegate |
| Shama Haider | Pakistan | Unknown | Democratic | 2022 | New Jersey General Assemblymember |
| Mark Hashem | Japan | Unknown | Democratic | 2010 | Hawaii State Representative |
| Foung Hawj | Laos | Unknown | Democratic | 2013 | Minnesota State Senator |
| Denise Hayman | Canada | Unknown | Democratic | 2023 | Montana State Senator |
| Ana Hernandez | Mexico | Unknown | Democratic | 2005 | Texas State Representative |
| Charniele Herring | Dominican Republic | Birth | Democratic | 2009 | Virginia Delegate |
| Huldah Hiltsley | Kenya | Unknown | Democratic | 2025 | Minnesota State Representative |
| Soo Hong | South Korea | Unknown | Republican | 2023 | Georgia State Representative |
| Tara Hong | Cambodia | Unknown | Democratic | 2025 | Massachusetts State Representative |
| Michael Hornby | Rhodesia | Unknown | Republican | 2022 | West Virginia Delegate |
| Vanna Howard | Cambodia | Unknown | Democratic | 2026 | Massachusetts State Senator |
| Joe Hoxha | Albania | Unknown | Republican | 2023 | Connecticut State Representative |
| George J. Hruza | Czechoslovakia | Unknown | Republican | 2025 | Missouri State Representative |
| Samakab Hussein | Somalia | Unknown | Democratic | 2023 | Minnesota State Representative |
| Hoan Huynh | Vietnam | Unknown | Democratic | 2023 | Illinois State Representative |
| Tony Hwang | Taiwan | Unknown | Republican | 2015 | Connecticut State Senator |
| Alicia Hyndman | England | Unknown | Democratic | 2016 | New York State Assemblymember |
| Greggor Ilagan | Philippines | Unknown | Democratic | 2020 | Hawaii State Representative |
| Russ Ingalls | Japan | Birth | Republican | 2020 | Vermont State Senator |
| Berny Jacques | Haiti | Unknown | Republican | 2022 | Florida State Representative |
| Kayse Jama | Somalia | Unknown | Democratic | 2021 | Oregon State Senator |
| Jean Jeudy | Haiti | Naturalization | Democratic | 2005 | New Hampshire State Representative |
| Dotie Joseph | Haiti | Naturalization | Democratic | 2018 | Florida State Representative |
| Junie Joseph | Haiti | Unknown | Democratic | 2023 | Colorado State Representative |
| Ash Kalra | Canada | Unknown | Democratic | 2016 | California State Assemblyman |
| Robert Karabinchak | West Germany | Naturalization | Democratic | 2016 | New Jersey State Assemblymember |
| Scott Kawasaki | Japan | Birth | Democratic | 2019 | Alaska State Senator |
| Aboul Khan | Bangladesh | Unknown | Republican | 2016 | New Hampshire State Representative |
| Maryam Khan | Pakistan | Unknown | Democratic | 2022 | Connecticut State Representative |
| Ron Kim | South Korea | Unknown | Democratic | 2013 | New York State Assemblymember |
| Jon Koznick | Colombia | Unknown | Republican | 2015 | Minnesota State Representative |
| Nima Kulkarni | India | Unknown | Democratic | 2019 | Kentucky State Representative |
| Sabi "Doc" Kumar | India | Unknown | Republican | 2015 | Tennessee State Representative |
| Trish La Chica | Philippines | Unknown | Democratic | 2023 | Hawaii State Representative |
| Suleman Lalani | Pakistan | Unknown | Democratic | 2023 | Texas State Representative |
| Michael Lazzara | Italy | Unknown | Republican | 2021 | North Carolina State Senator |
| Fue Lee | Thailand | Naturalization | Democratic | 2017 | Minnesota State Representative |
| Xp Lee | Thailand | Naturalization | Democratic | 2025 | Minnesota State Representative |
| Jason Lewis | South Africa | Unknown | Democratic | 2014 | Massachusetts State Senator |
| Marvin Lim | Philippines | Unknown | Democratic | 2021 | Georgia State Representative |
| John Liu | Taiwan | Unknown | Democratic | 2019 | New York State Senator |
| Ya Liu | China | Naturalization | Democratic | 2019 | North Carolina State Representative |
| Lesley Lopez | Bermuda | Birth | Democratic | 2019 | Maryland State Delegate |
| José Manuel Lozano | Mexico | Unknown | Republican | 2011 | Texas State Representative |
| Eric Lucero | West Germany | Unknown | Republican | 2023 | Minnesota State Senator |
| Vince Mangold | Philippines | Birth | Republican | 2016 | Mississippi State Representative |
| Alice Mann | Brazil | Unknown | Democratic | 2023 | Minnesota State Senator |
| Sanjeev Manohar | India | Unknown | Democratic | 2024 | New Hampshire State Representative |
| Monica Martinez | El Salvador | Unknown | Democratic | 2023 | New York State Senator |
| Elaine Marzola | Brazil | Unknown | Democratic | 2020 | Nevada State Assemblymember |
| Ian Masters | West Germany | Birth | Republican | 2025 | West Virginia Delegate |
| Gregorio Matías Rosario | Dominican Republic | Unknown | New Progressive | 2020 | Puerto Rico Senator |
| Margitta Mazzocchi | West Germany | Naturalization | Republican | 2020 | West Virginia Delegate |
| Donald McFarlane | United Kingdom | Unknown | Republican | 2024 | New Hampshire State Representative |
| Mark McLean | Canada | Unknown | Republican | 2022 | New Hampshire State Representative |
| Rita Mendes | Brazil | Unknown | Democratic | 2023 | Massachusetts State Representative |
| Gloria Mendoza | Mexico | Unknown | Republican | 2025 | Washington State Representative |
| Marcela Mitaynes | Peru | Unknown | Democratic | 2021 | New York State Assemblymember |
| Ismail Mohamed | Somalia | Unknown | Democratic | 2023 | Ohio State Representative |
| Zaynab Mohamed | Somalia | Unknown | Democratic | 2023 | Minnesota State Senator |
| Steve Montenegro | El Salvador | Unknown | Republican | 2023 | Arizona State Representative |
| Cinthia Zermeño Moore | Mexico | Unknown | Democratic | 2024 | Nevada State Assemblymember |
| Eddie Morales | Mexico | Unknown | Democratic | 2021 | Texas State Representative |
| Diana Moreno | Ecuador | Unknown | Democratic | 2026 | New York State Assemblymember |
| Melanie Morgan | England | Birth | Democratic | 2019 | Washington State Representative |
| Raj Mukherji | India | Unknown | Democratic | 2014 | New Jersey State Senator |
| Al Muratsuchi | Japan | Unknown | Democratic | 2016 | California State Assemblyman |
| Alissandra Murray | Nicaragua | Unknown | Democratic | 2022 | New Hampshire State Representative |
| Janne Myrdal | Norway | Naturalization | Republican | 2016 | North Dakota State Senator |
| Hanadi Nadeem | Saudi Arabia | Unknown | Democratic | 2024 | Nevada State Assemblymember |
| Cindy Nava | Mexico | Naturalization | Democratic | 2025 | New Mexico State Senator |
| Duy Nguyen | Vietnam | Unknown | Democratic | 2022 | Nevada State Assemblymember |
| Hoang Nguyen | Vietnam | Unknown | Democratic | 2025 | Utah State Representative |
| Quang Nguyen | South Vietnam | Unknown | Republican | 2021 | Arizona State Representative |
| Tram Nguyen | Vietnam | Unknown | Democratic | 2019 | Massachusetts State Representative |
| T'wina Nobles | West Germany | Unknown | Democratic | 2021 | Washington State Senator |
| Mohamud Noor | Somalia | Unknown | Democratic | 2019 | Minnesota State Representative |
| Michael Novakhov | Azerbaijan SSR | Unknown | Republican | 2023 | New York State Assemblymember |
| Edwin Obras | Philippines | Unknown | Democratic | 2024 | Washington State Representative |
| KC Ohaebosim | Nigeria | Unknown | Democratic | 2017 | Kansas State Representative |
| Gabe Okoye | Nigeria | Unknown | Democratic | 2023 | Georgia State Representative |
| Liz Ortega | Mexico | Unknown | Democratic | 2022 | California State Assemblyman |
| Greg Overstreet | Canada | Birth | Republican | 2025 | Montana State Representative |
| Ellen Park | South Korea | Unknown | Democratic | 2022 | New Jersey General Assemblymember |
| William A. Parkinson | Philippines | Unknown | Democratic | 2023 | Guam Senator |
| Francisco E. Paulino | Dominican Republic | Unknown | Democratic | 2023 | Massachusetts State Representative |
| Pavel Payano | Dominican Republic | Unknown | Democratic | 2023 | Massachusetts State Senator |
| Joseline Peña-Melnyk | Dominican Republic | Derivation | Democratic | 2007 | Maryland State Delegate |
| Ramon Perez | Dominican Republic | Naturalization | Democratic | 2021 | Rhode Island State Representative |
| Roxanne Persaud | British Guiana | Unknown | Democratic | 2015 | New York State Senator |
| Susan Pha | Laos | Unknown | Democratic | 2023 | Minnesota State Senator |
| Hai Pham | Malaysia | Unknown | Democratic | 2023 | Oregon State Representative |
| Robert Phillips | England | Unknown | Democratic | 2011 | Rhode Island State Representative |
| Yury Polozov | Russian SFSR | Naturalization | Republican | 2022 | New Hampshire State Representative |
| Daniel Popovici-Muller | Romania | Naturalization | Republican | 2022 | New Hampshire State Representative |
| Milton E. Potter | British Virgin Islands | Unknown | Democratic | 2021 | Virgin Islands Senator |
| Fady Qaddoura | Palestine | Unknown | Democratic | 2020 | Indiana State Senator |
| Lily Qi | China | Naturalization | Democratic | 2019 | Maryland State Delegate |
| Ana Quezada | Dominican Republic | Unknown | Democratic | 2017 | Rhode Island State Senator |
| Sean Quinlan | British Hong Kong | Unknown | Democratic | 2016 | Hawaii State Representative |
| MD Rahman | Bangladesh | Unknown | Democratic | 2023 | Connecticut State Senator |
| Sheikh Rahman | Bangladesh | Unknown | Democratic | 2019 | Georgia State Senator |
| Atoosa Reaser | Iran | Unknown | Democratic | 2024 | Virginia Delegate |
| Estela Reyes | Dominican Republic | Unknown | Democratic | 2023 | Massachusetts State Representative |
| Karines Reyes | Dominican Republic | Unknown | Democratic | 2019 | New York State Assemblymember |
| Naquetta Ricks | Liberia | Unknown | Democratic | 2021 | Colorado State Representative |
| Jessie Rodriguez | El Salvador | Unknown | Republican | 2013 | Wisconsin State Assemblymember |
| Ruwa Romman | Jordan | Unknown | Democratic | 2023 | Georgia State Representative |
| James Rosapepe | Italy | Birth | Democratic | 2007 | Maryland State Senator |
| Nily Rozic | Israel | Unknown | Democratic | 2013 | New York State Assemblymember |
| Ilana Rubel | Canada | Unknown | Democratic | 2014 | Idaho State Representative |
| Blanca Rubio | Mexico | Unknown | Democratic | 2016 | California State Assemblywoman |
| Susan Rubio | Mexico | Naturalization | Democratic | 2018 | California State Senator |
| Patricia Rucker | Venezuela | Naturalization | Republican | 2016 | West Virginia State Senator |
| Cindy Ryu | South Korea | Unknown | Democratic | 2011 | Washington State Representative |
| Steven Sainz | Costa Rica | Unknown | Republican | 2019 | Georgia State Representative |
| Saddam Azlan Salim | Bangladesh | Unknown | Democratic | 2024 | Virginia State Senator |
| Gabby Salinas | Bolivia | Unknown | Democratic | 2025 | Tennessee State Representative |
| Santosh Salvi | India | Unknown | Democratic | 2024 | New Hampshire State Representative |
| Joy San Buenaventura | Philippines | Unknown | Democratic | 2020 | Hawaii State Senator |
| Farley Santos | Brazil | Unknown | Democratic | 2023 | Connecticut State Representative |
| Nader Sayegh | Jordan | Unknown | Democratic | 2019 | New York State Assemblymember |
| Tobias Schlingensiepen | Germany | Unknown | Democratic | 2023 | Kansas State Representative |
| Danillo Sena | Brazil | Unknown | Democratic | 2020 | Massachusetts State Representative |
| Sarahana Shrestha | Nepal | Unknown | Democratic | 2023 | New York State Assemblymember |
| Balvir Singh | India | Unknown | Democratic | 2025 | New Jersey General Assemblymember |
| Vandana Slatter | Canada | Unknown | Democratic | 2017 | Washington State Senator |
| Janeen Sollman | Philippines | Birth | Democratic | 2022 | Oregon State Senator |
| Anita Somani | India | Unknown | Democratic | 2023 | Ohio State Representative |
| Priscila Sousa | Brazil | Unknown | Democratic | 2023 | Massachusetts State Representative |
| Trevor Squirrell | England | Unknown | Democratic | 2017 | Vermont State Representative |
| Kannan Srinivasan | India | Naturalization | Democratic | 2025 | Virginia State Senator; Virginia Delegate |
| Sterley Stanley | India | Unknown | Democratic | 2021 | New Jersey General Assemblymember |
| Henry Stone | South Korea | Birth | Republican | 2021 | Iowa State Representative |
| Tammy Story | West Germany | Birth | Democratic | 2023 | Colorado State Representative |
| Tri Ta | South Vietnam | Unknown | Republican | 2022 | California State Assemblyman |
| Yudelka Tapia | Dominican Republic | Unknown | Democratic | 2021 | New York State Assemblymember |
| My-Linh Thai | South Vietnam | Unknown | Democratic | 2019 | Washington State Representative |
| Caleb Theodros | Eritrea | Unknown | Democratic | 2025 | North Carolina State Senator |
| Kathy Tran | Vietnam | Unknown | Democratic | 2018 | Virginia Delegate |
| Thuy Tran | South Vietnam | Unknown | Democratic | 2023 | Oregon State Representative |
| Stacey Travers | Greece | Unknown | Democratic | 2023 | Arizona State Representative |
| Yasmin Trudeau | Bangladesh | Unknown | Democratic | 2021 | Washington State Senator |
| Elizabeth Velasco | Mexico | Unknown | Democratic | 2023 | Colorado State Representative |
| Arvind Venkat | India | Unknown | Democratic | 2023 | Pennsylvania State Representative |
| Hubert Vo | South Vietnam | Unknown | Democratic | 2005 | Texas State Representative |
| Joe Vogel | Uruguay | Naturalization | Democratic | 2023 | Maryland State Delegate |
| Larry Wainstein | Argentina | Unknown | Democratic | 2026 | New Jersey General Assemblymember |
| Glenn Wakai | Japan | Unknown | Democratic | 2010 | Hawaii State Senator |
| Chris Ward | West Germany | Unknown | Democratic | 2020 | California State Assemblyman |
| Ruth Ward | China | Naturalization | Republican | 2016 | New Hampshire State Senator |
| Emily Weber | South Korea | Unknown | Democratic | 2021 | Missouri State Representative |
| Ron Weinberg | South Africa | Unknown | Republican | 2023 | Colorado State Representative |
| Carine Werner | Unknown | Unknown | Republican | 2025 | Arizona State Senator |
| Jaime Williams | Trinidad and Tobago | Unknown | Democratic | 2016 | New York State Assemblymember |
| Jheanelle Wilkins | Jamaica | Unknown | Democratic | 2017 | Maryland State Delegate |
| Marie Woodson | Haiti | Unknown | Democratic | 2020 | Florida State Representative |
| Teresa Saavedra Woorman | Mexico | Unknown | Democratic | 2024 | Maryland State Delegate |
| Chao Wu | China | Naturalization | Democratic | 2023 | Maryland State Delegate |
| Gene Wu | China | Unknown | Democratic | 2013 | Texas State Representative |
| Mai Xiong | Thailand | Unknown | Democratic | 2024 | Michigan State Representative |
| Rui Xu | Switzerland | Naturalization | Democratic | 2019 | Kansas State Representative |
| Cheryl Youakim | West Germany | Unknown | Democratic | 2015 | Minnesota State Representative |
| Yusuf Yusuf | Somalia | Naturalization | Democratic | 2024 | Maine State Representative |
| Samuel Zager | Philippines | Birth | Democratic | 2020 | Maine State Representative |
| Janice Zahn | British Hong Kong | Unknown | Democratic | 2025 | Washington State Representative |

=== Mayors ===
| Mayor | Place of birth | Citizenship by | Party | Serving since | Position(s) held |
|---|---|---|---|---|---|
| Karen Goh | India | Naturalization | Republican | 2017 | Mayor of Bakersfield, California |
| Victor Gordo | Mexico | Unknown | Democratic | 2020 | Mayor of Pasadena, California |
| Kaohly Her | Laos | Naturalization | Democratic | 2026 | Mayor of Saint Paul, Minnesota |
| Glenn Jacobs | Spain | Birth | Republican | 2018 | County Mayor of Knox County, Tennessee |
| John Laesch | Liberia | Unknown | Democratic | 2025 | Mayor of Aurora, Illinois |
| Zohran Mamdani | Uganda | Naturalization | Democratic | 2026 | Mayor of New York City |
| Esther Manheimer | Denmark | Birth | Democratic | 2013 | Mayor of Asheville, North Carolina |
| Yemi Mobolade | Nigeria | Naturalization | Independent | 2023 | Mayor of Colorado Springs |
| Nadia Mohamed | Somalia | Naturalization | Democratic | 2023 | Mayor of St. Louis Park, Minnesota |
| Helena Moreno | Mexico | Unknown | Democratic | 2026 | Mayor of New Orleans |
| Lily Wu | Guatemala | Unknown | Libertarian | 2024 | Mayor of Wichita, Kansas |

=== Others ===
| Name | Place of birth | Citizenship by | Party | Positions held |
|---|---|---|---|---|
| Nina Ahmad | Bangladesh | Unknown | Democratic | Member of Philadelphia City Council |
| Nida Allam | Canada | Unknown | Democratic | Durham County Commissioner |
| George Cardenas | Mexico | Unknown | Democratic | Member of the Cook County Board of Review |
| Connie Chan | Hong Kong | Unknown | Democratic | Member of the San Francisco Board of Supervisors |
| Chyanne Chen | China | Unknown | Democratic | Member of the San Francisco Board of Supervisors |
| Ruth Cruz | Mexico | Unknown | Democratic | Member of the Chicago City Council |
| Rita Joseph | Haiti | Unknown | Democratic | Member of the New York City Council |
| Otto Lee | Hong Kong | Unknown | Democratic | Member of the Santa Clara County Board of Supervisors |
| Julia Mejia | Dominican Republic | Unknown | Democratic | Member of the Boston City Council |
| Myrna Melgar | El Salvador | Unknown | Democratic | Member of the San Francisco Board of Supervisors |
| Mercedes Narcisse | Haiti | Unknown | Democratic | Member of the New York City Council |
| Adrin Nazarian | Iran | Unknown | Democratic | Member of the Los Angeles City Council |
| Janet Nguyen | Vietnam | Unknown | Republican | Member of the Orange County Board of Supervisors |
| Thu Nguyen | Vietnam | Unknown | Democratic | Member of the Worcester, Massachusetts City Council |
| Sandy Nurse | Panama | Unknown | Democratic | Member of the New York City Council |
| Vop Osili | Nigeria | Unknown | Democratic | President of the Indianapolis City-County Council |
| Jamal Osman | Somalia | Unknown | Democratic | Member of the Minneapolis City Council |
| Mazi Melesa Pilip | Ethiopia | Naturalization | Republican | Member of the Nassau County Legislature |
| Nithya Raman | India | Unknown | Democratic | Member of the Los Angeles City Council |
| Hazelle P. Rogers | Jamaica | Unknown | Democratic | Member of the Broward County Commission, former Florida State Representative |
| Carmen De La Rosa | Dominican Republic | Unknown | Democratic | Member of the New York City Council |
| Vicente Sarmiento | Bolivia | Unknown | Democratic | Member of the Orange County Board of Supervisors |
| Byron Sigcho-Lopez | Ecuador | Unknown | Democratic | Member of the Chicago City Council |
| Melania Trump | Yugoslavia | Naturalization | Republican | First Lady of the United States |
| Sandra Ung | Cambodia | Unknown | Democratic | Member of the New York City Council |
| Inna Vernikov | Ukrainian SSR | Unknown | Republican | Member of the New York City Council |
| Julie Won | South Korea | Unknown | Democratic | Member of the New York City Council |

== Former ==
=== Members of Congress ===
==== Representatives ====
| Representative | Country/place of birth | Citizenship by | Party | Position(s) held |
|---|---|---|---|---|
| John J. Adams | New Brunswick | Unknown | Democratic | U.S. Representative from New York |
| Victor Anfuso | Italy | Unknown | Democratic | U.S. Representative from New York |
| Henry M. Arens | Germany | Derivation | Farmer-Labor | U.S. Representative from Minnesota |
| William Armstrong | (Kingdom of Ireland) Ireland | Unknown | Democratic-Republican | U.S. Representative from Virginia |
| Chester G. Atkins | Switzerland | Birth | Democratic | U.S. Representative from Massachusetts |
| Robert Baker | England | Unknown | Democratic | U.S. Representative from New York |
| Ron Barber | England | Birth | Democratic | U.S. Representative from Arizona |
| Samuel Fleming Barr | Ireland | Unknown | Republican | U.S. Representative from Pennsylvania |
| William Bernard Barry | Ireland | Unknown | Democratic | U.S. Representative from New York |
| Richard Bartholdt | Principality of Reuss-Gera | Unknown | Republican | U.S. Representative from Missouri |
| Charles Barwig | Hesse | Unknown | Democratic | U.S. Representative from Wisconsin |
| William Beatty | (Kingdom of Ireland) Ireland | Unknown | Democratic | U.S. Representative from Pennsylvania |
| James Burnie Beck | Scotland | Unknown | Democratic | U.S. Representative from Kentucky |
| Carlos Bee | Mexico | Birth | Democratic | U.S. Representative from Texas |
| Andrew Beirne | (Kingdom of Ireland) Ireland | Unknown | Jeffersonian Republican | U.S. Representative from Virginia |
| Victor L. Berger | Austria | Naturalization | Socialist | U.S. Representative from Wisconsin |
| John Bernard | France | Derivation | Farmer-Labor | U.S. Representative from Minnesota |
| Charles Gustav Binderup | Denmark | Unknown | Democratic | U.S. Representative from Nebraska |
| Haldor Boen | Norway | Derivation | Populist | U.S. Representative from Minnesota |
| Azariah Boody | Lower Canada | Unknown | Whig | U.S. Representative from New York |
| Thomas W. Bradley | England | Unknown | Republican | U.S. Representative from New York |
| Edward Breitung | Saxe-Meiningen | Unknown | Republican | U.S. Representative from Michigan |
| Robert G. Bremner | Scotland | Unknown | Democratic | U.S. Representative from New Jersey |
| George H. Brickner | Bavaria | Unknown | Democratic | U.S. Representative from Wisconsin |
| James Frankland Briggs | England | Unknown | Republican | U.S. Representative from New Hampshire |
| Henry Bristow | Azores | Unknown | Republican | U.S. Representative from New York |
| John W. Brown | Scotland | Derivation | Jacksonian | U.S. Representative from New York |
| Hugh Buchanan | Scotland | Unknown | Democratic | U.S. Representative from Georgia |
| Charles F. Buck | Baden | Unknown | Democratic | U.S. Representative from Louisiana |
| Samuel Swinfin Burdett | England | Unknown | Republican | U.S. Representative from Missouri |
| Henry Burk | Württemberg | Unknown | Republican | U.S. Representative from Pennsylvania |
| Aedanus Burke | (Kingdom of Ireland) Ireland | Derivation | Anti-Administration | U.S. Representative from South Carolina |
| William J. Burke | England | Unknown | Republican | U.S. Representative from Pennsylvania |
| George Burnham | England | Unknown | Republican | U.S. Representative from California |
| Thomas Burnside | (Kingdom of Ireland) Ireland | Derivation | Democratic-Republican | U.S. Representative from Pennsylvania |
| Joseph Henry Burrows | England | Derivation | Greenback | U.S. Representative from Missouri |
| Sala Burton | Poland | Unknown | Democratic | U.S. Representative from California |
| Thompson Campbell | Ireland | Unknown | Democratic | U.S. Representative from Illinois |
| Timothy J. Campbell | Ireland | Unknown | Democratic | U.S. Representative from New York |
| Joseph Cao | South Vietnam | Naturalization | Republican | U.S. Representative from Louisiana |
| Louis Capozzoli | Italy | Unknown | Democratic | U.S. Representative from New York |
| Patrick J. Carley | Ireland | Unknown | Democratic | U.S. Representative from New York |
| Peter Angelo Cavicchia | Italy | Unknown | Republican | U.S. Representative from New Jersey |
| William W. Chalmers | Canada | Unknown | Republican | U.S. Representative from Ohio |
| William B. Charles | Scotland | Unknown | Republican | U.S. Representative from New York |
| John Michael Clancy | Ireland | Unknown | Democratic | U.S. Representative from New York |
| William Bourke Cockran | Ireland | Naturalization | Democratic | U.S. Representative from New York |
| Patrick Collins | Ireland | Derivation | Democratic | U.S. Representative from Massachusetts |
| James Cooney | Ireland | Unknown | Democratic | U.S. Representative from Missouri |
| John G. Cooper | England | Naturalization | Republican | U.S. Representative from Ohio |
| Hector Craig | Scotland | Unknown | Jacksonian | U.S. Representative from New York |
| William Crawford | Scotland | Naturalization | Democratic-Republican | U.S. Representative from Pennsylvania |
| Thomas J. Creamer | Ireland | Unknown | Democratic | U.S. Representative from New York |
| Charles Frederick Crisp | England | Unknown | Democratic | U.S. Representative from Georgia |
| Robert Crosser | Scotland | Unknown | Democratic | U.S. Representative from Ohio |
| Frank Crowther | England | Unknown | Republican | U.S. Representative from New York |
| George Calhoun Crowther | England | Unknown | Republican | U.S. Representative from Missouri |
| William Cullen | Ireland | Unknown | Republican | U.S. Representative from Illinois |
| Thomas Cusack | Ireland | Unknown | Democratic | U.S. Representative from Illinois |
| Geoff Davis | Canada | Birth | Republican | U.S. Representative from Kentucky |
| Robert T. Davis | Ireland | Unknown | Republican | U.S. Representative from Massachusetts |
| Benjamin Dean | England | Derivation | Democratic | U.S. Representative from Massachusetts |
| Edward Degener | Prussia | Unknown | Republican | U.S. Representative from Wisconsin |
| Steven Derounian | Bulgaria | Unknown | Republican | U.S. Representative from New York |
| Peter V. Deuster | Prussia | Derivation | Democratic | U.S. Representative from Missouri |
| Lincoln Díaz-Balart | Cuba | Naturalization | Republican | U.S. Representative from Florida |
| Samuel Dickstein | Russia | Unknown | Democratic | U.S. Representative from New York |
| Michael Donohoe | Ireland | Derivation | Democratic | U.S. Representative from Pennsylvania |
| Mervyn Dymally | Trinidad and Tobago | Derivation | Democratic | U.S. Representative from California |
| Charles Aubrey Eaton | Canada | Unknown | Republican | U.S. Representative from New Jersey |
| Henry Ellenbogen | Austria-Hungary | Unknown | Democratic | U.S. Representative from Pennsylvania |
| John Ewing | (Kingdom of Ireland) Ireland | Derivation | Multiple | U.S. Representative from Indiana |
| Jacob Falconer | Canada | Derivation | Progressive | U.S. Representative from Washington |
| Michael F. Farley | Ireland | Derivation | Democratic | U.S. Representative from New York |
| John McCreath Farquhar | Scotland | Unknown | Republican | U.S. Representative from New York |
| William Findley | (Kingdom of Ireland) Ireland | Unknown | Multiple | U.S. Representative from Pennsylvania |
| John F. Finerty | Ireland | Derivation | Independent Democratic | U.S. Representative from Illinois |
| Gustavus A. Finkelnburg | Prussia | Derivation | Multiple | U.S. Representative from Missouri |
| Mayra Flores | Mexico | Naturalization | Republican | U.S. Representative from Texas |
| Nicholas Ford | Ireland | Derivation | Greenback | U.S. Representative from Missouri |
| Elizabeth Furse | Kenya | Derivation | Democratic | U.S. Representative from Oregon |
| Albert Gallatin | Geneva | Unknown | Democratic-Republican | U.S. Representative from Pennsylvania |
| Bernard J. Gehrmann | Germany | Derivation | Progressive | U.S. Representative from Wisconsin |
| Sam Gejdenson | Germany | Unknown | Democratic | U.S. Representative from Connecticut |
| James Gillespie | (Kingdom of Ireland) Ireland | Unknown | Multiple | U.S. Representative from North Carolina |
| George W. Gillie | Scotland | Unknown | Republican | U.S. Representative from Indiana |
| Martin Gorski | Poland | Unknown | Democratic | U.S. Representative from Illinois |
| James McMahon Graham | Ireland | Derivation | Democratic | U.S. Representative from Illinois |
| Ernest Greenwood | England | Unknown | Democratic | U.S. Representative from New York |
| John Greig | Scotland | Naturalization | Whig | U.S. Representative from New York |
| James Gunn | Ireland | Derivation | Populist | U.S. Representative from Idaho |
| Michael Hahn | Bavaria | Derivation | Multiple | U.S. Representative from Louisiana |
| Kittel Halvorson | Norway | Derivation | Populist | U.S. Representative from Minnesota |
| Alexander M. Hardy | Upper Canada | Unknown | Republican | U.S. Representative from Indiana |
| John Hardy | Scotland | Unknown | Democratic | U.S. Representative from New York |
| Alexander Harper | (Kingdom of Ireland) Ireland | Naturalization | Whig | U.S. Representative from Ohio |
| Richard A. Harrison | England | Derivation | Unionist | U.S. Representative from Ohio |
| Nils P. Haugen | Norway | Unknown | Republican | U.S. Representative from Wisconsin |
| William Heilman | Hesse | Unknown | Republican | U.S. Representative from Indiana |
| Samuel Henderson | England | Naturalization | Federalist | U.S. Representative from Pennsylvania |
| Pete Hoekstra | Netherlands | Derivation | Republican | U.S. Representative from Michigan |
| William Hogan | England | Derivation | Jacksonian | U.S. Representative from New York |
| Einar Hoidale | Norway | Naturalization | Democratic | U.S. Representative from Minnesota |
| Pehr G. Holmes | Sweden | Unknown | Republican | U.S. Representative from Massachusetts |
| Denis M. Hurley | Ireland | Derivation | Republican | U.S. Representative from New York |
| Jacob Johnson | Denmark | Unknown | Republican | U.S. Representative from Utah |
| John Johnson | Ireland | Derivation | Independent Democratic | U.S. Representative from Ohio |
| Niels Juul | Denmark | Derivation | Republican | U.S. Representative from Illinois |
| John Lauderdale Kennedy | Scotland | Naturalization | Republican | U.S. Representative from Nebraska |
| Ruben Kihuen | Mexico | Naturalization | Democratic | U.S. Representative from Nevada |
| Jay Kim | Japanese Korea | Naturalization | Republican | U.S. Representative from California |
| Harold Knutson | Norway | Naturalization | Republican | U.S. Representative from Minnesota (House Majority Whip) |
| Ernie Konnyu | Hungary | Derivation | Republican | U.S. Representative from California |
| John Hans Krebs | Germany | Derivation | Democratic | U.S. Representative from California |
| Otto Krueger | Russia | Unknown | Republican | U.S. Representative from North Dakota |
| Tom Lantos | Hungary | Naturalized | Democratic | U.S. Representative from California |
| Herman Lehlbach | Baden | Unknown | Republican | U.S. Representative from New Jersey |
| Charles Lieb | Württemberg | Unknown | Democratic | U.S. Representative from Indiana |
| John Lind | Sweden | Unknown | Democratic | U.S. Representative from Minnesota |
| Charles August Lindbergh | Sweden | Naturalization | Republican | U.S. Representative from Minnesota |
| Meyer London | Poland | Naturalization | Socialist | U.S. Representative from New York |
| Robert Lowry | Ireland | Unknown | Democratic | U.S. Representative from Indiana |
| John Baptiste Charles Lucas | France | Naturalization | Democratic-Republican | U.S. Representative from Pennsylvania |
| Thaddeus M. Machrowicz | Prussia | Unknown | Democratic | U.S. Representative from Michigan |
| John C. Mackie | Canada | Unknown | Democratic | U.S. Representative from Michigan |
| Tom Malinowski | Poland | Unknown | Democratic | U.S. Representative from New Jersey |
| Sean Patrick Maloney | Canada | Birth | Democratic | U.S. Representative from New York |
| Noah M. Mason | Wales | Unknown | Republican | U.S. Representative from Illinois |
| William McAdoo | Ireland | Unknown | Democrat | U.S. Representative from New Jersey |
| Archibald McBryde | Scotland | Unknown | Federalist | U.S. Representative from North Carolina |
| George B. McClellan Jr. | Kingdom of Saxony | Unknown | Democartic | U.S. Representative from New York |
| Blair McClenachan | (Kingdom of Ireland) Ireland | Derivation | Democratic-Republican | U.S. Representative from Pennsylvania |
| William McCreery | (Kingdom of Ireland) Ireland | Naturalization | Democratic-Republican | U.S. Representative from Maryland |
| Donald McEachin | West Germany | Unknown | Democratic | U.S. Representative from Virginia |
| Lawrence E. McGann | Ireland | Unknown | Democratic | U.S. Representative from Illinois |
| John J. McGrath | Ireland | Naturalization | Democratic | U.S. Representative from California |
| James McLachlan | Scotland | Unknown | Republican | U.S. Representative from California |
| Joseph McLaughlin | Ireland | Derivation | Republican | U.S. Representative from Pennsylvania |
| Frank Joseph McNulty | Ireland | Unknown | Democratic | U.S. Representative from New Jersey |
| M. Alfred Michaelson | Norway | Unknown | Republican | U.S. Representative from Illinois |
| Lucas M. Miller | (Greece) First Hellenic Republic | Derivation | Democratic | U.S. Representative from Wisconsin |
| Alfred Milnes | England | Unknown | Republican | U.S. Representative from Michigan |
| William Milnes Jr. | England | Derivation | Conservative | U.S. Representative from Virginia |
| Leopold Morse | Bavaria | Unknown | Democratic | U.S. Representative from Massachusetts |
| William Moxley | Ireland | Unknown | Republican | U.S. Representative from Illinois |
| Debbie Mucarsel-Powell | Ecuador | Naturalization | Democratic | U.S. Representative from Florida |
| Stephanie Murphy | Vietnam | Naturalization | Democratic | U.S. Representative from Florida |
| Michael N. Nolan | Ireland | Naturalization | Democratic | U.S. Representative from New York |
| James O'Brien | Ireland | Unknown | Independent Democratic | U.S. Representative from New York |
| Daniel O'Reilly | Ireland | Naturalization | Independent Democratic | U.S. Representative from New York |
| George F. O'Shaunessy | Ireland | Unknown | Democratic | U.S. Representative from Rhode Island |
| Robert Dale Owen | Scotland | Unknown | Democratic | U.S. Representative from Indiana |
| Romualdo Pacheco | Mexico | Unknown | Republican | U.S. Representative from California |
| William Prince | (Kingdom of Ireland) Ireland | Unknown | Democratic-Republican | U.S. Representative from Indiana |
| Joseph Pulitzer | Hungary | Unknown | Democratic | U.S. Representative from New York |
| John Quinn | Ireland | Naturalization | Democratic | U.S. Representative from New York |
| Robert L. Ramsay | England | Unknown | Democratic | U.S. Representative from West Virginia |
| James B. Reynolds | (Kingdom of Ireland) Ireland | Unknown | Democratic-Republican | U.S. Representative from Tennessee |
| John Richards | Wales | Naturalization | Democratic-Republican | U.S. Representative from New York |
| Ciro Rodriguez | Mexico | Unknown | Democratic | U.S. Representative from Texas |
| Ileana Ros-Lehtinen | Cuba | Derivation | Republican | U.S. Representative from Florida |
| Alphonse Roy | Canada | Naturalization | Democratic | U.S. Representative from New Hampshire |
| William Russell | Ireland | Naturalization | Multiple | U.S. Representative from Ohio |
| Robert Rutherford | Scotland | Derivation | Multiple | U.S. Representative from Virginia |
| Adolph J. Sabath | Bohemia | Unknown | Democratic | U.S. Representative from Illinois |
| Peter Sailly | France | Naturalization | Democratic-Republican | U.S. Representative from New York |
| Dalip Singh Saund | British India | Naturalization | Democratic | U.S. Representative from California |
| James Shields | (Kingdom of Ireland) Ireland | Naturalization | Jacksonian | U.S. Representative from Ohio |
| Jerry Simpson | Prince Edward Island | Derivation | Populist | U.S. Representative from Kansas |
| Albio Sires | Cuba | Derivation | Democratic | U.S. Representative from New Jersey |
| Charles Slade | England | Derivation | Jacksonian | U.S. Representative from Illinois |
| John Smilie | (Kingdom of Ireland) Ireland | Unknown | Multiple | U.S. Representative from Pennsylvania |
| O'Brien Smith | (Kingdom of Ireland) Ireland | Unknown | Democratic-Republican | U.S. Representative from South Carolina |
| Alexander Smyth | (Kingdom of Ireland) Ireland | Derivation | Democratic-Republican | U.S. Representative from Virginia |
| Michelle Steel | South Korea | Naturalization | Republican | U.S. Representative from California |
| Karl Stefan | Austria-Hungary | Derivation | Republican | U.S. Representative from Nebraska |
| Isidor Straus | Bavaria | Unknown | Democratic | U.S. Representative from New York |
| Arthur H. Taylor | (United Kingdom) Canada | Unknown | Democratic | U.S. Representative from Indiana |
| John K. Tener | Ireland | Unknown | Republican | U.S. Representative from Pennsylvania |
| John Thomson | (Kingdom of Ireland) Ireland | Derivation | Jacksonian | U.S. Representative from Ohio |
| Jacob Thorkelson | Norway | Naturalization | Republican | U.S. Representative from Montana |
| Herman Toll | Russian Empire | Unknown | Democratic | U.S. Representative from Pennsylvania |
| Thomas H. Tongue | England | Naturalization | Republican | U.S. Representative from Oregon |
| Charles W. Upham | Canada | Unknown | Whig | U.S. Representative from Massachusetts |
| Weston E. Vivian | Canada | Unknown | Democratic | U.S. Representative from Michigan |
| Edward Voigt | Germany | Unknown | Republican | U.S. Representative from Wisconsin |
| Benjamin Walker | England | N/A | Federalist | U.S. Representative from New York |
| Michael Walsh | Ireland | Derivation | Democratic | U.S. Representative from New York |
| Knud Wefald | Norway | Naturalization | Farmer-Labor | U.S. Representative from Minnesota |
| Theodore S. Weiss | Hungary | Derivation | Democratic | U.S. Representative from New York |
| Campbell P. White | (Kingdom of Ireland) Ireland | Naturalization | Jacksonian | U.S. Representative from New York |
| James Bain White | Scotland | Unknown | Republican | U.S. Representative from Indiana |
| Susan Wild | West Germany | Birth | Democratic | U.S. Representative from Pennsylvania |
| James Wilson | Scotland | Naturalization | Republican | U.S. Representative from Iowa |
| William Bauchop Wilson | Scotland | Naturalization | Democratic | U.S. Representative from Pennsylvania |
| John Sergeant Wise | Brazil | Birth | Readjuster | U.S. Representative from Virginia |
| John Travers Wood | England | Unknown | Republican | U.S. Representative from Idaho |
| Chase G. Woodhouse | Canada | Birth | Democratic | U.S. Representative from Connecticut |
| Charles W. Woodman | Denmark | Derivation | Republican | U.S. Representative from Illinois |
| David Wu | Taiwan | Unknown | Democratic | U.S. Representative from Oregon |

==== Delegates ====
| Delegate | Country/place of birth | Citizenship by | Party | Position(s) held |
|---|---|---|---|---|
| John Thomas Caine | Isle of Man | Naturalization | Democratic | Delegate from the Utah Territory |
| John G. Campbell | Scotland | Derivation | Democratic | Delegate from the Arizona Territory |
| George Q. Cannon | England | Naturalization | Republican | Delegate from the Utah Territory |
| Daniel Clark | (Kingdom of Ireland) Ireland | Naturalization | Independent | Delegate from the Orleans Territory |
| Charles P. Clever | Prussia | Naturalization | Independent | Delegate from the New Mexico Territory |
| Mary Elizabeth Pruett Farrington | Japan | Birth | Republican | Delegate from the Hawaiʻi Territory |
| David Archibald Harvey | Nova Scotia | Derivation | Republican | Delegate from the Oklahoma Territory |
| Santiago Iglesias | Spain | Naturalization | Coalitionist | Resident Commissioner from Puerto Rico; previously Puerto Rico Territorial Senator |
| Julien de Lallande Poydras | France | Naturalization | Independent | Delegate from the Orleans Territory |
| Bernard Shandon Rodey | Ireland | Naturalization | Republican | Delegate from the New Mexico Territory |
| Gabriel Richard | France | Naturalization | Independent | Delegate from Michigan Territory |
| Daniel Sutherland | Canada | Derivation | Republican | Delegate from Alaska Territory |

=== Statewide officials ===
| Official | Country/place of birth | Citizenship by | Party | Position(s) held |
|---|---|---|---|---|
| Francisco L. Borges | Cape Verde | Unknown | Democratic | Connecticut State Treasurer |
| Carlos Cascos | Mexico | Unknown | Republican | Secretary of State of Texas |
| Jim Cheng | Taiwan | Unknown | Republican | Virginia Secretary of Commerce |
| Richard Corcoran | Canada | Unknown | Republican | Education Commissioner of Florida |
| John Cunneen | Ireland | Unknown | Democratic | Attorney General of New York |
| Winsome Earle-Sears | Jamaica | Naturalization | Republican | Lieutenant Governor of Virginia |
| Thomas Addis Emmet | Ireland | Unknown | Democratic-Republican | Attorney General of New York |
| John W. Jochim | Sweden | Unknown | Republican | Michigan Secretary of State |
| James C. Ho | Taiwan | Unknown | Republican | Texas Solicitor General |
| Otto Kirchner | Prussia | Unknown | Republican | Michigan Attorney General |
| Kris Kolluri | India | Unknown | Democratic | New Jersey Commissioner of Transportation |
| William Q. Dallmeyer | Hanover | Unknown | Republican | State Treasurer of Missouri and Missouri State Representative |
| James H. MacDonald | Scotland | Unknown | Republican | Lieutenant Governor of Michigan |
| Leo T. McCarthy | New Zealand | Unknown | Democratic | Lieutenant Governor of California; previously California State Assemblyman (Speaker) and San Francisco Supervisor |
| Frank C. Moore | Canada | Unknown | Republican | Lieutenant Governor and Comptroller of New York |
| Rolando Pablos | Mexico | Unknown | Republican | Secretary of State of Texas |
| John Logan Power | Ireland | Unknown | Democratic | Secretary of State of Mississippi |
| Atif Qarni | Pakistan | Unknown | Democratic | Virginia Secretary of Education |
| Carl Sherman | Austria | Unknown | Unknown | Attorney General of New York |
| William Smith | England | Unknown | Unknown | Attorney General of New York |
| S. B. Woo | China | Unknown | Democratic | Lieutenant Governor of Delaware |

=== State legislators ===
| Name | Country/place of birth | Citizenship by | Party | Position(s) held |
|---|---|---|---|---|
| Katcho Achadjian | Lebanon | Unknown | Republican | California State Assemblyman |
| Knud Adland | Norway | Unknown | Republican | Wisconsin State Assemblyman |
| Amanda Aguirre | Mexico | Unknown | Democratic | Arizona State Senator |
| Abbas Akhil | India | Unknown | Democratic | New Mexico State Representative |
| Wilhelm Albers | Bavaria | Unknown | Democratic | Wisconsin State Assemblyman |
| Canute Anderson | Norway | Unknown | Republican | Wisconsin State Assemblyman |
| Nels Anderson | Norway | Unknown | Republican | Wisconsin State Assemblyman |
| Adam Apple | Bavaria | Unknown | Democratic | Wisconsin State Senator; Wisconsin State Assemblyman |
| Dennis Apuan | Philippines | Unknown | Democratic | Colorado State Representative |
| Aloysius Arnolds | Prussia | Unknown | Democratic | Wisconsin State Assemblyman |
| Harry Arora | India | Unknown | Republican | Connecticut State Representative |
| Alexander Assefa | Ethiopia | Unknown | Democratic | Nevada State Assemblyman |
| Maximilian Bachhuber | Bavaria | Unknown | Democratic | Wisconsin State Assemblyman |
| Theodore F. Bagge | Denmark | Unknown | Democratic | California State Assemblyman |
| Thomas Bainbridge | England | Unknown | Republican | Wisconsin State Assemblyman |
| Samba Baldeh | Gambia | Naturalization | Democratic | Wisconsin State Assemblyman |
| Mick Bates | Australia | Unknown | Multiple | West Virginia Delegate |
| Paul Bechtner | Württemberg | Unknown | Republican | Wisconsin State Senator |
| Moritz Becker | Bavaria | Unknown | Democratic | Wisconsin State Assemblyman |
| Henry Bertram | Prussia | Unknown | Independent | Wisconsin State Assemblyman |
| Robert J. Betge | Prussia | Unknown | Democratic | California State Senator |
| Hermann Rogalla von Bieberstein | Prussia | Unknown | Democratic | Texas State Representative |
| Michael Blenski | Prussia | Unknown | Democratic | Wisconsin State Assemblyman |
| Joseph Edward Bland | (United Kingdom) Canada | Unknown | Republican | Michigan State Senator; Michigan State Representative |
| Jacob Bodden | Prussia | Unknown | Democratic | Wisconsin State Assemblyman |
| Julius Bodenstab | Hanover | Unknown | Liberal Republican | Wisconsin State Assemblyman |
| John Russell Bohan | Ireland | Unknown | Democratic | Wisconsin State Senator; Wisconsin State Assemblyman |
| Susan Bonilla | Taiwan | Unknown | Democratic | California State Assemblywoman |
| Hans Borchsenius | Denmark | Unknown | Republican | Wisconsin State Assemblyman |
| Philip Bouffleur | Prussia | Unknown | Republican | Wisconsin State Assemblyman |
| Samuel Braunhart | Prussia | Unknown | Democratic | California State Senator |
| Suraj Budathoki | Bhutan | Unknown | Democratic | New Hampshire State Representative |
| Romeo Munoz Cachola | Philippines | Unknown | Democratic | Hawaii State Representative |
| Sandra Cano | Colombia | Unknown | Democratic | Rhode Island State Senator |
| Wendy Carrillo | El Salvador | Unknown | Democratic | California State Assemblywoman |
| John W. Carroll | Canada | Unknown | Republican | Majority Leader of the Illinois House of Representatives, Illinois Senator |
| Evandro Carvalho | Cape Verde | Unknown | Democratic | Massachusetts State Representative |
| Ling Ling Chang | Taiwan | Naturalization | Republican | California State Senator |
| Heather Chase | Canada | Unknown | Democratic | New Hampshire State Representative |
| Ed Chau | Hong Kong | Unknown | Democratic | California State Assemblyman |
| Cesar Chavez | Mexico | Unknown | Democratic | Arizona State Representative |
| Upendra J. Chivukula | India | Unknown | Democratic | New Jersey General Assemblyman; Mayor of Franklin Township, New Jersey |
| Iwen Chu | Taiwan | Unknown | Democratic | New York State Senator |
| Kansen Chu | Taiwan | Unknown | Democratic | California State Assemblyman |
| Ron Clark | Venezuela | Birth | Republican | Texas State Representative |
| Jerome Cochran | Vietnam | Unknown | Republican | Tennessee State Representative |
| Jacob De Cordova | Jamaica | Unknown | Unknown | Texas State Representative |
| José M. Covarrubias | France | Unknown | Unknown | California State Assemblyman |
| Jose Cruz | Mexico | Unknown | Democratic | Oklahoma State Representative |
| Swati Dandekar | India | Unknown | Democratic | Iowa State Senator; Iowa State Representative |
| Mona Das | India | Unknown | Democratic | Washington State Senator |
| Wadie P. Deddeh | Iraq | Unknown | Democratic | California State Assemblyman |
| Vinny deMacedo | Cape Verde | Unknown | Republican | Massachusetts State Senator |
| Tyler Diep | Vietnam | Unknown | Republican | California State Assemblyman |
| Lenea Edlund | Sweden | Unknown | Democratic | Washington State Representative |
| Dave Farnsworth | Mexico | Birth | Republican | Arizona State Senator |
| Anabel Figueroa | El Salvador | Unknown | Democratic | Connecticut State Representative |
| Frank G. Finlayson | Australia | Unknown | Democratic | California State Assemblyman |
| Marco Antonio Firebaugh | Mexico | Unknown | Democratic | California State Assemblyman |
| Garrett M. Fitzgerald | Ireland | Unknown | Democratic | Wisconsin State Assemblyman |
| Paul Fong | Portuguese Macau | Unknown | Democratic | California State Assemblyman |
| Richard Friske | Poland | Unknown | Republican | Michigan State Representative |
| Alina Garcia | Cuba | Unknown | Republican | Florida State Representative |
| Jorge Luis Garcia | Mexico | Unknown | Democratic | Arizona State Senator |
| Ramon Gonzalez Jr. | Mexico | Unknown | Republican | Kansas State Representative |
| Elizabeth Guzman | Peru | Unknown | Democratic | Virginia Delegate |
| Godfrey Haga | Württemberg | Unknown | Unknown | Pennsylvania State Representative |
| Agoston Haraszthy | Kingdom of Hungary | Unknown | Unknown | California State Assemblyman |
| Hodan Hassan | Somalia | Unknown | Democratic | Minnesota State Representative |
| Mary Hayashi | South Korea | Unknown | Democratic | California State Assemblywoman |
| Theodor Rudolph Hertzberg | Prussia | Unknown | Radical Republican | Texas State Senator |
| Frederick A. Hihn | Braunschweig | Unknown | Independent | California State Assemblyman |
| Al Jacquet | Netherlands Antilles | Naturalization | Democratic | Florida State Representative |
| Jay Jalisi | Pakistan | Unknown | Democratic | Maryland Delegate |
| Dafna Michaelson Jenet | Israel | Unknown | Democratic | Colorado State Senator |
| Maurice Johannessen | Norway | Unknown | Republican | California State Senator |
| Joseph W. Jourdan | Australia | Unknown | Unknown | California State Assemblyman |
| Anna Kaplan | Iran | Unknown | Democratic | New York State Senator |
| Mark Keam | South Korea | Unknown | Democratic | Virginia Delegate |
| Ben Klassen | Ukrainian PR | Unknown | Republican | Florida State Representative |
| Richard Komi | Nigeria | Unknown | Democratic | New Hampshire State Representative |
| Jim Kreider | West Germany | Unknown | Democratic | Missouri State Representative |
| Myron Kulas | Ukrainian SSR | Unknown | Democratic | Illinois State Representative |
| Padma Kuppa | India | Unknown | Democratic | Michigan State Representative |
| Felix LaBauve | France | Unknown | Democratic | Mississippi State Senator |
| Idalia Lechuga-Tena | Mexico | Unknown | Democratic | New Mexico State Representative |
| Teresa Alonso Leon | Mexico | Unknown | Democratic | Oregon State Representative |
| Patty Lopez | Mexico | Unknown | Democratic | California State Assemblywoman |
| Joey Manahan | Philippines | Unknown | Democratic | Hawaii State Representative |
| Leopold Marks | Prussia | Unknown | Democratic | Mississippi State Representative |
| Malachi Martin | Ireland | Unknown | Republican | Speaker of the Florida House of Representatives |
| Rose Martinez | Philippines | Unknown | Democratic | Hawaii State Representative |
| Juana Matias | Dominican Republic | Unknown | Democratic | Massachusetts State Representative |
| Nimi McConigley | India | Unknown | Republican | Wyoming State Representative |
| Hugh McFarlane | Ireland | Unknown | Democratic | Wisconsin State Assemblyman |
| Donna McLeod | Jamaica | Unknown | Democratic | Georgia State Representative |
| Otfried Hans Freiherr von Meusebach | Prussia | Unknown | | Texas State Senator |
| Jimmy Meng | China | Unknown | Democratic | New York State Assemblyman |
| Rady Mom | Cambodia | Unknown | Democratic | Massachusetts State Representative |
| John Moorlach | Netherlands | Naturalization | Republican | California State Senator |
| Gabriela Mosquera | Ecuador | Unknown | Democratic | New Jersey State Assemblywoman |
| Mee Moua | Laos | Unknown | Democratic | Minnesota State Senator |
| Catherine Mulholland | England | Naturalization | Democratic | New Hampshire State Representative |
| Shirley Nathan-Pulliam | Jamaica | Unknown | Democratic | Maryland State Senator |
| Pedro Nava | Mexico | Unknown | Democratic | California State Assemblyman |
| Adrin Nazarian | Iran | Unknown | Democratic | California State Assemblyman |
| Karl Heinrich Nimitz | Bremen | Unknown | Democratic | Texas State Representative |
| Yuh-Line Niou | Taiwan | Unknown | Democratic | New York State Assemblywoman |
| Charles Œtling | Hanover | Unknown | Democratic | Wisconsin State Assemblyman |
| Maria Perez | El Salvador | Unknown | Independent | New Hampshire State Representative |
| N. Nick Perry | Jamaica | Unknown | Democratic | U.S. Ambassador to Japan and New York State Assemblyman |
| Peter Polin | Switzerland | Unknown | Republican | Wisconsin State Assemblyman |
| Leopold Prince | Prussia | Unknown | Democratic | New York State Assemblyman |
| Ed Propst | Samoa | Unknown | Democratic | Northern Mariana Islands Representative |
| Marcelino Quiñonez | Mexico | Unknown | Democratic | Arizona State Representative |
| Marcia Ranglin-Vassell | Jamaica | Naturalization | Democratic | Rhode Island State Representative |
| Felipe Reinoso | Peru | Unknown | Democratic | Connecticut State Representative |
| James DeNoon Reymert | Norway | Unknown | Democratic | Wisconsin State Senator; Wisconsin State Assemblyman |
| Kirill Reznik | Ukrainian SSR | Unknown | Democratic | Maryland Delegate |
| Pauline Rhodd-Cummings | Jamaica | Unknown | Democratic | New York State Assemblywoman |
| Maria Robinson | South Korea | Unknown | Democratic | Massachusetts State Representative |
| Erich F. Schmidt | Braunschweig | Unknown | Democratic | Texas State Representative |
| Barney Semmelman | German Empire | Unknown | Democratic | Mississippi State Representative |
| William F. Sieker | Prussia | Unknown | Republican | Wisconsin State Assemblyman |
| Christy Smith | West Germany | Birth | Democratic | California State Assemblywoman |
| Jose Solorio | Mexico | Unknown | Democratic | California State Assemblyman |
| Augustus D. Splivalo | Chile | Unknown | Unknown | California State Assemblyman |
| Edward A. Stevenson Sr. | Jamaica | Unknown | Democratic | New York State Assemblyman |
| David Storobin | USSR | Unknown | Republican | New York State Senator |
| Thomas Sugden | England | Unknown | Republican | Wisconsin State Assemblyman |
| Leezah Sun | South Korea | Unknown | Democratic | Arizona State Representative |
| Leo H. Susman | Australia | Unknown | Republican | California State Assemblyman |
| Henry Suverkrup | Denmark | Unknown | Independent | California State Assemblyman |
| Annette Taddeo | Colombia | Birth | Democratic | Florida State Senator |
| Saggy Tahir | India | Unknown | Republican | New Hampshire State Representative |
| Cy Thao | Laos | Unknown | Democratic | Minnesota State Representative |
| Kevin Thomas | UAE | Unknown | Democratic | New York State Senator |
| Jackie Toledo | Peru | Naturalization | Republican | Florida State Representative |
| Ben Toma | Romania | Unknown | Republican | Arizona State Representative |
| Dean Tran | Vietnam | Unknown | Republican | Massachusetts State Representative |
| Van Tran | Vietnam | Unknown | Republican | California State Assemblyman |
| Silverio Vega | Cuba | Unknown | Democratic | New Jersey General Assemblyman; Mayor of West New York, New Jersey |
| Mel Vogel | Baden | Unknown | Republican | California State Assemblyman |
| Safiya Wazir | Afghanistan | Unknown | Democratic | New Hampshire State Representative |
| Augustus Weismann | Württemberg | Unknown | Republican | New York State Senator |
| Anastasia Williams | Panama | Unknown | Democratic | Rhode Island State Representative |
| Dethloff Willrodt | Holstein | Naturalization | Democratic | Texas State Representative |
| Leland Yee | China | Unknown | Democratic | California State Senator |
| Ervin Yen | Taiwan | Unknown | Republican | Oklahoma State Senator |
| Mae Yih | China | Unknown | Democratic | Oregon State Senator |
| Ellen Young | Taiwan | Unknown | Democratic | New York State Assemblywoman |
| John Yule | Scotland | Unknown | Republican | California State Assemblyman |
| Juan C. Zapata | Colombia | Unknown | Republican | Florida State Representative |
| Joseph Zaretzki | Poland | Naturalization | Democratic | New York State Senator |
| Ardian Zika | Yugoslavia | Naturalization | Republican | Florida State Representative |

=== Mayors ===
| Mayor | Country of birth | Citizenship by | Party | Position(s) held |
|---|---|---|---|---|
| Chris Alahouzos | Greece | Unknown | Republican | Mayor of Tarpon Springs, Florida |
| Harvinder "Harry" Anand | India | Unknown | Republican | Mayor of Laurel Hollow, New York |
| George Alexander | Scotland | Unknown | Unknown | Mayor of Los Angeles |
| James G. Barry | Ireland | Derivation | Democratic | Mayor of St. Louis |
| Abraham Beame | United Kingdom | Unknown | Democratic | Mayor of New York City |
| Luigi Boria | Venezuela | Naturalization | Republican | Mayor of Doral, Florida |
| John T. Browne | Ireland | Unknown | N/A | Mayor of Houston |
| Gavin Buckley | South Africa | Naturalization | Democratic | Mayor of Annapolis, Maryland |
| Isabella Cannon | United Kingdom | Unknown | Democratic | Mayor of Raleigh, North Carolina |
| William H. Carlson | Sweden | Unknown | Independent | Mayor of San Diego |
| Joe Carollo | Cuba | Naturalization | Republican | Mayor of Miami |
| Anthony J. Celebrezze | Italy | Naturalization | Democratic | Mayor of Cleveland |
| Josaphat Celestin | Haiti | Naturalization | Republican | Mayor of North Miami, Florida |
| Anton Cermak | Austria-Hungary | Unknown | Democratic | Mayor of Chicago |
| Sokhary Chau | Cambodia | Naturalization | Democratic | Mayor of Lowell, Massachusetts |
| Lily Lee Chen | China | Unknown | Unknown | Mayor of Monterey Park, California |
| Wilmot Collins | Liberia | Naturalization | Independent, later Democratic | Mayor of Helena, Montana |
| James J. Couzens | Canada | Unknown | Republican | Mayor of Detroit |
| Richard Croker | Ireland | Naturalization | Democratic | Mayor of New York City |
| Jimmy Delshad | Iran | Naturalization | Democratic | Mayor of Beverly Hills, California |
| Philippe Derose | Haiti | Naturalization | N/A | Mayor of El Portal, Florida |
| Manny Diaz | Cuba | Unknown | Democratic | Mayor of Miami |
| Thomas Fallon | Ireland | Naturalization | N/A | Mayor of San Jose, California |
| Joseph Gales Sr. | United Kingdom | Unknown | Whig | Intendant of Police of Raleigh, North Carolina |
| Antonio María de la Guerra | Mexico | Unknown | Independent | Mayor of Santa Barbara, California |
| Amer Ghalib | Yemen | Unknown | Democratic | Mayor of Hamtramck, Michigan |
| Kashmir Gill | India | Unknown | Republican | Mayor of Yuba City, California |
| Charles P. Gillen | Ireland | Derivation | Democratic | Mayor of Newark, New Jersey |
| Thomas F. Gilroy | Ireland | Unknown | Democratic | Mayor of New York City |
| Philip Giordano | Venezuela | Naturalization | Republican | Mayor of Waterbury, Connecticut |
| Patrick Gleason | Ireland | Naturalization | Democratic | Mayor of Long Island City, New York |
| William R. Grace | Ireland | Naturalization | N/A | Mayor of New York City |
| Vincent R. Impellitteri | Italy | Unknown | Democratic | Mayor of New York City |
| Farrah Khan | Pakistan | Unknown | Democratic | Mayor of Irvine, California |
| Oscar Leeser | Mexico | Naturalization | Democratic | Mayor of El Paso, Texas |
| Alexander Lewis | Upper Canada | Unknown | Democratic | Mayor of Detroit |
| Marco A. Lopez Jr. | Mexico | Unknown | Democratic | Mayor of Nogales, Arizona |
| Steve Ly | Laos | Unknown | Independent | Mayor of Elk Grove, California |
| George Maguire | Ireland | Unknown | Democratic | Mayor of St. Louis |
| P.H. McCarthy | Ireland | Derivation | Republican | Mayor of San Francisco |
| Frank McCoppin | Ireland | Naturalization | N/A | Mayor of San Francisco |
| Joseph Medill | New Brunswick | Unknown | Republican | Mayor of Chicago |
| Hugh Moffat | United Kingdom | Naturalization | Republican | Mayor of Detroit |
| Robert M. Moore | Ireland | Naturalization | N/A | Mayor of Cincinnati |
| Mboka Mwilambwe | Zaire | Unknown | Independent | Mayor of Bloomington, Illinois |
| Bao Nguyen | Thailand | Unknown | Democratic | Mayor of Garden Grove, California |
| Christopher D. O'Brien | Ireland | Unknown | N/A | Mayor of St. Paul, Minnesota |
| Hugh O'Brien | Ireland | Unknown | Democratic | Mayor of Boston |
| William O'Dwyer | Ireland | Unknown | Democratic | Mayor of New York City |
| Estevan Ochoa | Mexico | Unknown | Unknown | Mayor of Tucson, Arizona |
| John Patton | Ireland | Naturalization | Democratic | Mayor of Detroit |
| Miguel A. Pulido | Mexico | Unknown | Democratic | Mayor of Santa Ana, California |
| Tomás Regalado | Cuba | Derivation | Republican | Mayor of Miami |
| William Richert | Germany | Unknown | Republican | Acting Mayor of Detroit |
| Jose Maria Redondo | Mexico | Unknown | Unknown | Mayor of Yuma, Arizona |
| Sumbul Siddiqui | Pakistan | Unknown | Republican | Mayor of Cambridge, Massachusetts |
| Harry Sidhu | India | Unknown | Republican | Mayor of Anaheim, California |
| Jerry Springer | United Kingdom | Unknown | Democratic | Mayor of Cincinnati |
| Xavier Suarez | Cuba | Naturalization | Independent | Mayor of Miami |
| Adolph Sutro | Prussia | Unknown | Populist | Mayor of San Francisco |
| Robert Uribe | Dominican Republic | Unknown | Unknown | Mayor of Douglas, Arizona |
| Ygnacio del Valle | Mexico | Unknown | Unknown | Mayor of Los Angeles |
| Eileen Wang | China | Unknown | Democratic | Mayor of Arcadia, California |
| Bob Yousefian | Iran | Unknown | Unknown | Mayor of Glendale, California |
| Larry Zarian | Iran | Unknown | Unknown | Mayor of Glendale, California |

=== Others ===
| Name | Country/place of birth | Citizenship by | Party | Position(s) held |
|---|---|---|---|---|
| Louisa Adams | United Kingdom | Unknown | Democratic-Republican | First Lady of the United States |
| Sal Albanese | Italy | Unknown | Democratic | Member of the New York City Council |
| Tania Fernandes Anderson | Cape Verde | Unknown | Democratic | Member of the Boston City Council |
| Rosemary Barkett | Mexico | Unknown | Independent | Chief Justice of the Supreme Court of Florida |
| Francesca Braggiotti | Italy | Unknown | Republican | First Lady of Connecticut |
| David Brewer | Ottoman Empire | Birth | Republican | Associate Justice of the Supreme Court |
| Columba Bush | Mexico | Naturalization | Republican | First Lady of Florida |
| Vicky Cayetano | Philippines | Unknown | Democrat | First Lady of Hawaii |
| Dagmar Braun Celeste | Germany | Unknown | Democrat | First Lady of Ohio |
| Elisa Chan | Taiwan | Unknown | Republican | Member of the San Antonio City Council |
| Esther de Berdt | United Kingdom | Unknown | Unknown | First Lady of Pennsylvania |
| Andrew Do | Vietnam | Unknown | Republican | Member of the Orange County Board of Supervisors |
| Ignacio De La Fuente | Mexico | Unknown | Democratic | Vice Mayor of the Oakland City Council |
| Felix Frankfurter | Austria-Hungary | Unknown | Independent | Associate Justice of the Supreme Court |
| Yumi Hogan | South Korea | Unknown | Republican | First Lady of Maryland |
| Jose Huizar | Mexico | Unknown | Democratic | Member of the Los Angeles City Council |
| James Iredell | United Kingdom | Unknown | Federalist | Attorney General of North Carolina and Associate Justice of the Supreme Court |
| Susheela Jayapal | India | Unknown | Democratic | Member of the Multnomah County Board of Commissioners |
| Supriya Jolly Jindal | India | Unknown | Republican | First Lady of Louisiana |
| Ari Kagan | Byelorussian SSR | Unknown | Republican | Member of the New York City Council |
| Safiya Khalid | Somalia | Unknown | Democratic | Member of the Lewiston, Maine City Council |
| Zalmay Khalilzad | Afghanistan | Naturalization | Republican | United States Ambassador to the United Nations |
| M.J. Khan | Pakistan | Unknown | Unknown | Member of Houston City Council |
| Tony Lam | Vietnam | Unlknown | Unknown | Member of Westminster, California City Council |
| Lormong Lo | Laos | Unlknown | Republican | Member of Omaha City Council |
| Dina Matos | Portugal | Unknown | Democrat | First Lady of New Jersey |
| Michael Margaret Stewart | France | Unknown | Democrat | First Lady of Alaska |
| George Meade | Spain | Unknown | Unknown | Commander of the Army of the Potomac |
| Jean Monestime | Haiti | Naturalization | Democratic | Miami-Dade County Commissioner |
| Ricardo Munoz | Mexico | Unknown | Democratic | Member of Chicago City Council |
| Madison Nguyen | Vietnam | Unknown | Democratic | Vice Mayor of San Jose; member of San Jose City Council |
| Gordon Quan | China | Unknown | Democratic | Member of Houston City Council, Houston Mayor Pro-Tem |
| Karl Racine | Haiti | Unknown | Democratic | Attorney General for the District of Columbia |
| Harpreet Sandhu | India | Unknown | Democratic | Member of Richmond, California City Council |
| Kshama Sawant | India | Naturalization | Socialist Alternative | Member of the Seattle City Council |
| Daniel Solis | Mexico | Unknown | Democratic | Member of the Chicago City Council |
| Friedrich Wilhelm von Steuben | Brandenburg | Unknown | Independent | Inspector general of the army |
| Helen Thorpe | United Kingdom | Unknown | Democratic | First Lady of Colorado |
| John Tran | Vietnam | Unknown | Democratic | Member of the Rosemead, California City Council |
| Nora Vargas | Mexico | Unknown | Democratic | Chair of the San Diego County Board of Supervisors |
| Eileen Wang | China | Unknown | Democratic | Member of the Arcadia, California City Council |
| Abdi Warsame | Somalia | Unknown | Democratic | Member of the Minneapolis City Council |
| James Wilson | United Kingdom | Unknown | Federalist | Associate Justice of the Supreme Court |
| Joe Bee Xiong | Laos | Unknown | Democratic | Member of Eau Claire City Council |

== Elect ==
=== Members of Congress ===
==== Senators ====
| Senator | Country/place of birth | Citizenship by | Party | Position(s) held |

==== Representatives ====
| Representative | Country/place of birth | Citizenship by | Party | Position(s) held |

=== Statewide officials ===
| Official | Country/place of birth | Citizenship by | Party | Position(s) held |

=== Mayors ===
| Mayor | Country/place of birth | Citizenship by | Party | Position(s) held |

== Totals ==
=== Totals by country ===
| Modern country | Number of politicians |
|---|---|
| Ireland | 68 |
| United Kingdom | 47 |
| Germany | 24 |
| Canada | 22 |
| Norway | 20 |
| Peru | 19 |
| Cuba | 11 |
| Mexico | 10 |
| France | 9 |
| Sweden | 9 |
| Dominican Republic | 8 |
| South Korea | 8 |
| Denmark | 7 |
| Haiti | 6 |
| India | 5 |
| Taiwan | 5 |
| Hungary | 4 |
| Italy | 4 |
| Austria | 3 |
| Czech Republic | 3 |
| Japan | 3 |
| Poland | 3 |
| Switzerland | 3 |
| Trinidad and Tobago | 3 |
| Colombia | 2 |
| Jamaica | 2 |
| Lithuania | 2 |
| Portugal | 2 |
| Spain | 2 |
| Thailand | 2 |
| Venezuela | 2 |
| Vietnam | 2 |
| Afghanistan | 1 |
| Belgium | 1 |
| Bulgaria | 1 |
| Cambodia | 1 |
| Cayman Islands | 1 |
| Costa Rica | 1 |
| Ecuador | 1 |
| Estonia | 1 |
| Greece | 1 |
| Guatemala | 1 |
| Iran | 1 |
| Kenya | 1 |
| Kosovo | 1 |
| Netherlands | 1 |
| New Zealand | 1 |
| Pakistan | 1 |
| Panama | 1 |
| Philippines | 1 |
| Romania | 1 |
| Sint Maarten | 1 |
| Slovenia | 1 |
| Somalia | 1 |
| South Africa | 1 |
| St. Kitts and Nevis | 1 |
| Turkey | 1 |
| Ukraine | 1 |

== See also ==
- Natural-born-citizen clause (United States)
- List of United States governors born outside the United States
- List of United States senators born outside the United States
- List of foreign-born French politicians
- List of foreign-born Brazilian politicians
