= History of Somalis in Maine =

As of 2013, there were around 10,000 Somalis in Lewiston and Portland. In 2022 the number in Maine was reported to be around 6,000.

== History ==
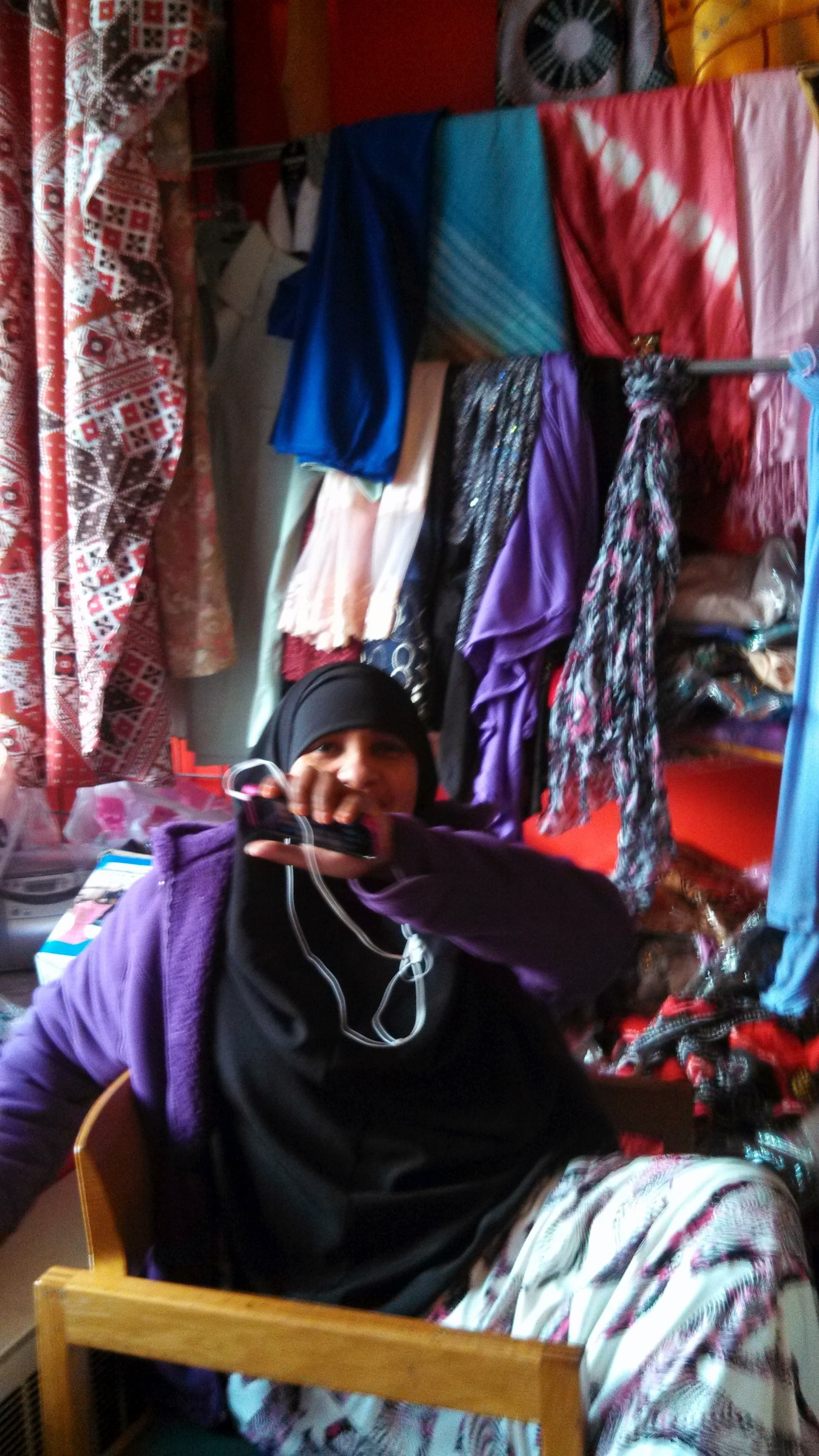
A Somali woman in Lewiston.

In the 1990s, thousands of Somali immigrants in the United States began a secondary migration to Maine from other states due to the area's low crime rate, good schools and cheap housing.

In October 2002, Lewiston Mayor Laurier T. Raymond wrote an open letter addressed to leaders of the Somali community, predicting a negative impact on the city's social services and requesting that they discourage further relocation to Lewiston. The letter angered some people and prompted some community leaders and residents to speak out against the mayor, drawing national attention. Demonstrations were held in Lewiston, both by those who supported the immigrants' presence and those who opposed it.

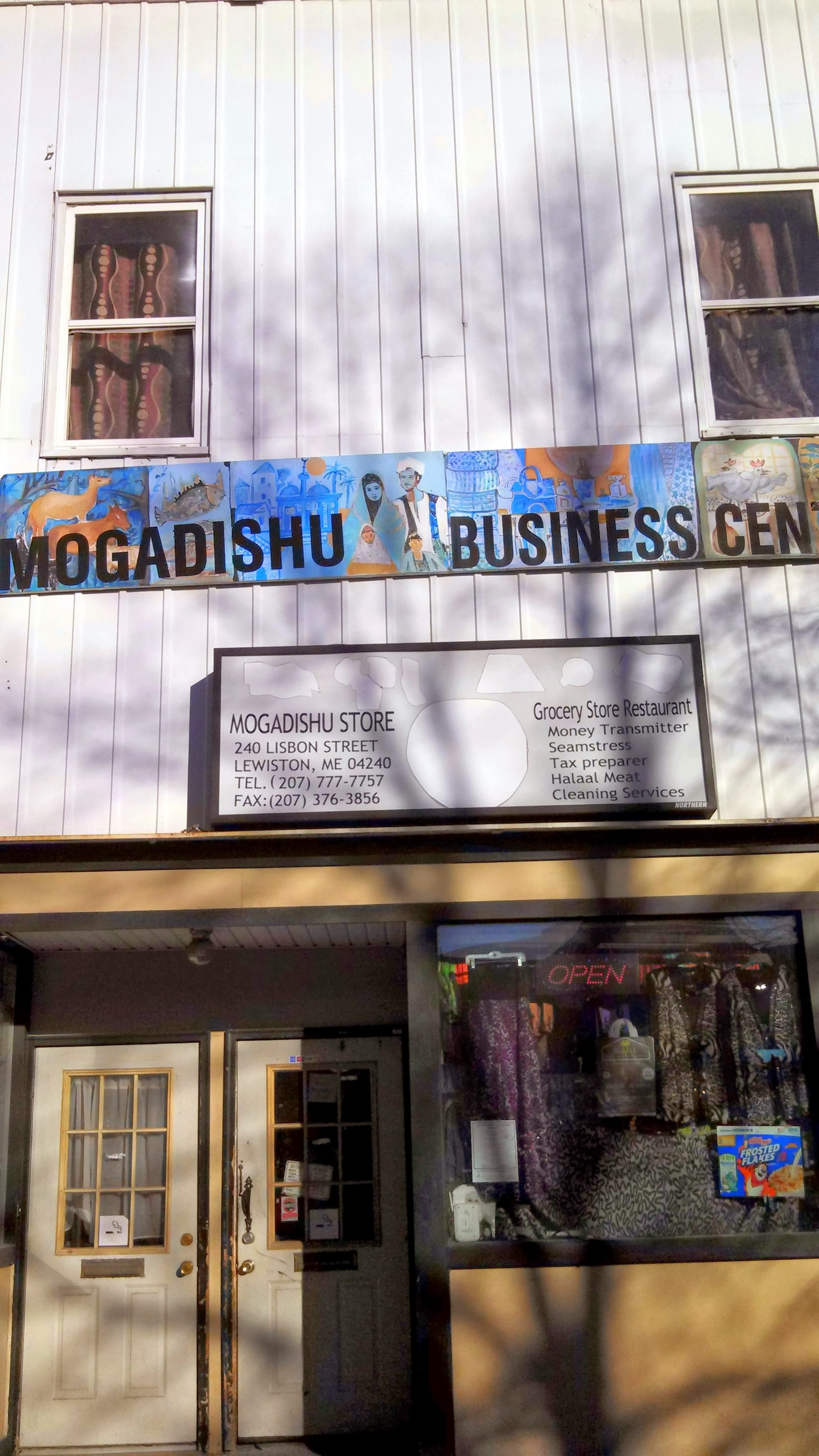
The Somali-owned Mogadishu Business Center in Lewiston.

In January 2003, a small white supremacist group demonstrated in Lewiston in support of the mayor, prompting a simultaneous counter-demonstration of about 4,000 people at Bates College and the organization of the "Many and One Coalition". Only 32 attended the rally by the white supremacist group. The mayor was out of state on the day of the rallies, while governor John Baldacci and other officials attended.

In 2006, a severed frozen pig's head was thrown into a Lewiston mosque while about 40 men were praying. This was considered very offensive by the Muslim community, as swine is proscribed in Islam. A man admitted to the act and claimed it to be a joke.

In 2006, KPMG International released a study identifying the best places to do business around the world and ranked Lewiston as the best in New England. In January 2009, Newsweek associated a drop in crime rate, soaring income per capita and increased business activity in Lewiston with recent immigration to the town by Somalis.

In June 2011, the Lewiston Sun Journal also noted the growing number of Somali recent immigrants earning high school diplomas, with more enrolling in local community colleges. The college students consist of both adult undergraduate and continuing education pupils, as well as high school graduates. In 2015, immigrants from Somalia also led Lewiston High School's Blue Devils boys soccer team to win the state championships under coach Mike McGraw.

In 2025, Maine's first professional soccer team, the Portland Hearts of Pine, signed Lewiston High School alumnus Khalid Hersi following an open tryout for Maine residents only. Hersi is the first Mainer to play for the team. Hersi's older brother, Bilal, also played for Lewiston High School and currently plays for Siena College's men's soccer team, in addition to Somalia's national team.

== Demographics ==
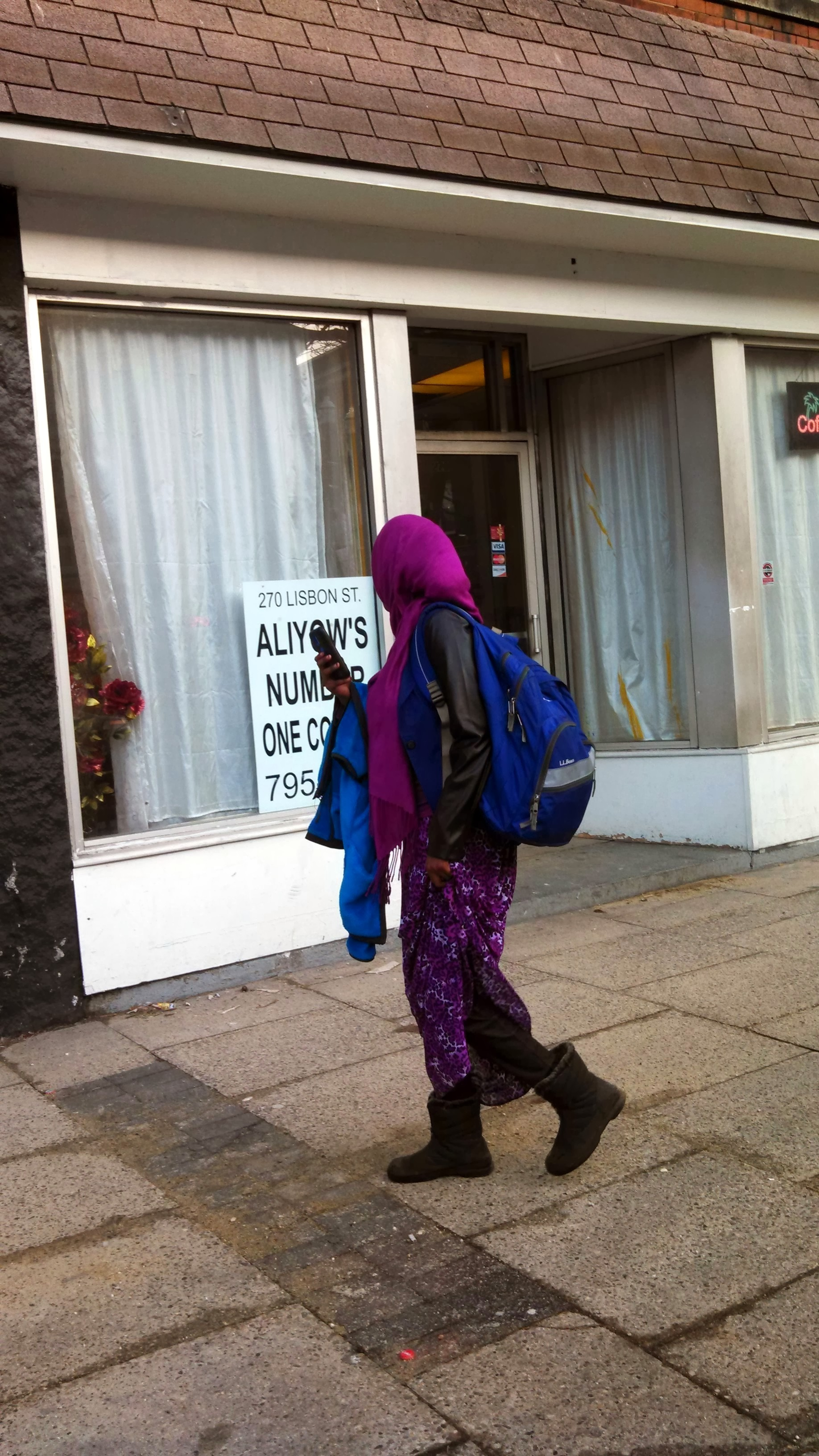
A Somali shop on Lisbon Street.

In 2011, there were an estimated 5,000 Somali immigrants in Lewiston. Around 5,000 Somalis also resided in Portland. According to the Immigrant Resource Center, there were approximately 7,500 immigrants from East Africa in Androscoggin County where Lewiston is located, including individuals from Somalia.

Somalis have opened up community centers to cater to their community. In 2001, the non-profit organization United Somali Women of Maine (USWM) was founded in Lewiston, seeking to promote the empowerment of Somali women and girls across the state. The Somali Community Resource Center also provides English and citizenship classes among other services to Portland's resident Somalis, as does the Somali Cultural & Development Association.

As of 2014, the most common non-English language spoken by students of the Lewiston Public Schools is Somali. Speakers make up around 90% of the district's pupils who do not speak English as a native language.

== Commerce ==
In August 2010, the Lewiston Sun Journal reported that Somali entrepreneurs had helped reinvigorate downtown Lewiston by opening dozens of shops in previously closed storefronts. Amicable relations were also reported by local merchants of French-Canadian descent and Somali storekeepers.

== Politics ==
In 2010, several Somali immigrants, now citizens of the United States and residents of Portland, filed to run for the Maine Legislature. Mohammed Dini ran in District 119 in a Democratic Party primary, and Badr Sharif ran in the Republican Party primary for District 116; both candidates were defeated in primary challenges. Additionally, Portland's Somali community led a campaign to permit non-citizens to vote in municipal elections.

In August 2016, while campaigning in Portland, Maine, at a rally Donald Trump said, "We've just seen many, many crimes getting worse all the time, and as Maine knows—a major destination for Somali refugees—right, am I right?" The Lewiston police chief responded saying Somalis had integrated into the city and had not caused an increase in crime and that crime was actually going down, not up. The Lewiston mayor said Lewiston was safe and they all get along. At a Somali support rally following Trump's comments, Portland mayor Ethan Strimling welcomed the city's Somali residents, saying, "We need you here." Maine Republican senator Susan Collins commented, "Mr. Trump's statements disparaging immigrants who have come to this country legally are particularly unhelpful. Maine has benefited from people from Europe, the Middle East, Asia, and, increasingly, Africa—including our friends from Somalia."

Following the 2016 U.S. presidential election of Donald Trump, the federal government released Executive Order 13780, a three-month travel restriction against citizens of six Muslim-majority countries, including Somalia. Somalis and other immigrants in Lewiston as well as local residents worried that the temporary decision had put a strain on communal living.

In 2017, a record three Somalia-born candidates, all newcomers to politics, unsuccessfully ran for the school committee in Lewiston.

In 2019, Somali refugee Safiya Khalid was elected to the Lewiston city council.

Deqa Dhalac, a native of Mogadishu, was elected to the South Portland city council in 2018 and was re-elected unopposed in 2020. She became mayor of the city in 2021, and was elected to the Maine House of Representatives District 120 in 2022 and re-elected in 2024. The 2022 election also saw the election Mana Abdi to the 95th District; Abdi was also re-elected in 2024. Dhalac and Abdi are both Democrats. In 2024, they were joined by a third Somali-American Democrat in the House of Representatives, with Yusuf Yusuf being elected from the 118th district. Yusuf had previously served on the Portland School Board.

In December 2025, the mayor of Lewiston, Maine, stated that the presence of Somali residents in the city “has been instrumental in Lewiston’s revitalization;” the mayor issued this statement in response to Donald Trump once again making disparaging remarks about people of Somali origin. Throughout the state’s history, immigrants “have helped to mold the economic, cultural, and social character of Maine,” and the contributions of the Somali community are no exception. Upholding civic rhetoric is widely understood to be fundamental in embracing the common humanity of all Americans, therefore faith leaders have been among those calling upon everyone “to refrain from [using] denigrating and dehumanizing language” based on ethnicity or country of origin. Furthermore, the concept that America “relies on … a common set of ideals to which we all aspire,” is clearly embraced by many Somalis in the U.S., who, in the words of a Somali resident who arrived in Maine 23 years ago, have “regarded the United States as a beacon of human rights.”

== See also ==
- Somali Americans
- Somali diaspora
- Dalmar TV, a Somali-language television network
- History of Somalis in Minneapolis–Saint Paul
