= Lewiston High School =

Lewiston High School may refer to:

- Lewiston High School (Idaho)
- Lewiston High School (Maine)
