= Herbert Ernest Cushman =

American philosophy professor (1865–1944)

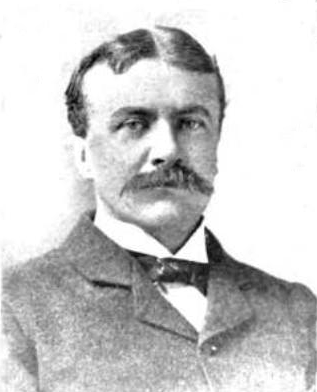
- Born: October 24, 1865; Auburn, Maine, US
- Died: December 16, 1944 (aged 79); West Newton, Massachusetts, US
- Education: Harvard University; Bates College
- Occupation: Philosopher
- Spouse: Abby Brewster Corbin (m. 1904)
- Children: 4

Herbert Ernest Cushman (October 24, 1865 – December 16, 1944) was an American philosopher. He was a professor of philosophy at Tufts College.

== Biography ==
Herbert Ernest Cushman was born in Auburn, Maine, on October 24, 1865. He attended Lewiston High School, then earned Bachelor of Arts, Master of Arts, and Ph.D. degrees at Harvard University, and an A.B. and honorary LL.D. at Bates College.

He married Abby Brewster Corbin in 1904, and they had four children.

He wrote A Beginner's History of Philosophy and translated Wilhelm Windelband's History of Ancient Philosophy into English.

He died in West Newton, Massachusetts, on December 16, 1944.

== Selected works ==
- History of Ancient Philosophy (translation, 1899)
- The Truth in Christian Science (lecture, 1902)
- What Is Christianity? (lecture, 1904)
- A Beginner's History of Philosophy (1910; reprinted 1918)
