= Robert Carrier =

Robert Carrier may refer to:

- Robert Carrier (chef) (1923–2006), restaurateur and cookery writer
- Robert Carrier (politician) (born 1941), Canadian politician
- J. Robert Carrier (1925–2016), American politician from Maine
