= Lenea Edlund =

American politician

Member of the Washington House of Representatives from the 44th district
- In office 1934–1936

Personal details
- Born: 1891 Sweden
- Died: 1937 (aged 45–46)
- Party: Democratic

Lenea L. Edlund (1891–1937) was a Swedish-born American politician. She was a Democrat, representing District 44 in the Washington House of Representatives which included parts of King County, from 1934 to 1936.

== See also ==
- List of foreign-born United States politicians
