= Yusuf Yusuf =

American politician

Member of the Maine House of Representatives from the 118th district
- Incumbent
- Assumed office December 3, 2024
- Preceded by: Rachel Talbot Ross

Personal details
- Born: Mogadishu, Somalia
- Party: Democratic
- Spouse: Halimo Mohamed
- Education: Western Washington University (BS)

Yusuf M. Yusuf is an American politician serving as a member of the Maine House of Representatives from the 118th district since being elected in 2024.

== Early life and career ==
Yusuf was born and raised in Somalia, then fled during the Somali Civil War and lived in Damascus, Syria for six years before arriving in the United States in 2007 and settling in Seattle, Washington. He earned a Bachelor of Science in sociology from Western Washington University in 2016. He then moved to Maine in the same year and worked as a mental health case manager at Gateway Community Services. As of 2018, Yusuf had not returned to Somalia.

In 2020, Yusuf ran for an at-large seat of the Portland School Board. In November 2023, he joined a letter alongside other elected officials calling on Maine's congressional delegation to support a ceasefire in Gaza.

After Lewiston-based nonprofit Gateway Community Services was charged by the Maine State Auditor December 2025 for overpayments, Yusuf removed a reference on his legislative website stating he worked closely with the organization. In January 2026, media outlet The Maine Wire reported that Yusuf and his wife, Halimo Mohamed, were tied to a network of business entities owned by Somali-Americans which received millions from the Maine Department of Health and Human Services.

== Maine House of Representatives ==
In 2024, Yusuf ran to succeed incumbent Democrat Rachel Talbot Ross, who was term-limited and running for Maine State Senate. State Senator Ben Chipman was running but withdrew the day for the primary for unspecified reasons, leaving Yusuf and Herbert Adams as the only candidates for the Democratic primary election. He defeated Adams in the primary election with 56% of the vote and was unopposed in the general election.

Following president Donald Trump's remarks calling Somalia a "garbage" country in December 2025, Yusuf joined fellow Somali-American state representatives Mana Abdi and Deqa Dhalac in a letter criticizing the comment.

== See also ==
- History of Somalis in Maine
