= James E. Smith (Montana politician) =

American politician

39th Mayor of Helena
- In office May 2001 – January 2018
- Preceded by: J. Michael Houston
- Succeeded by: Wilmot Collins

Personal details
- Born: November 15, 1948 (age 77) Anaconda, Montana, U.S.
- Spouse: Katherine Bailey (m. 1974)
- Children: 2
- Education: Carroll College (BA); Montana State University (MPA)
- Profession: State Legislative Lobbyist (retired)

James E. Smith (born November 15, 1948) is the former mayor of Helena, Montana, the state's capital, having served in that position for 16 years, from 2002 until 2018. He was also the president of the Jedediah Smith Society from 2016 until 2019 and as vice-president from 2019-2022.

== See also ==
- List of mayors of Helena, Montana
