= List of mayors of Helena, Montana =

The following is a list of mayors of the city of Helena, Montana, United States.

- John Kinna, c.1881-1882
- T.H. Kleinschmidt, c.1882, 1886-1887, 1892-1893
- E.W. Knight, c.1882-1883
- W.B. Hundley, c.1884-1885
- James Sullivan, c.1885-1886
- W.L. Steele, c.1887-1888, 1895-1898
- Thomas P. Fuller, c.1888-1891
- Donald Bradford, c.1891-1892
- John C. Curtin, c.1892-1894
- E.D. Weed, c.1894-1895
- F.J. Edwards, c.1898-1904, 1908-1911
- R.R. Purcell, c.1904-1906, 1912-1914, 1916-1918
- F.S.P. Lindsay, c.1906-1908
- Edward Horsky, c.1911-1912
- Lincoln Working, c.1914-1916
- John Dryburgh, c.1918-1922
- Percy Witmer, c.1922-1930
- George P. Arnold, c.1930-1932
- C.J. Bausch, c.1932-1936
- Albert J. Roberts, c.1936-1940
- John J. Haytin, c.1940-1946
- J.R. Wine, c.1947-1951
- J. R. Kaiserman, c.1951-1953
- Otto L. Brackman, c.1953-1960
- Wanna F. Thompson, c.1960-1961
- Robert E. Johnson, c.1962-1963
- John W. Schroeder, c.1964-1965
- David A. Lewis, c.1966-1967, 1968-1971
- Darryl Lee, c.1967-1968
- Stephen Kein, c.1972-1973
- Don M. Harriot, c.1974-1975
- A.W. Scribner, c.1976-1977
- Kathleen Ramey, c.1978-1979
- Richard D. Brown, c.1980-1981
- Russell J. Ritter, c.1982-1991
- H. Kay McKenna, c.1992-1995
- Colleen McCarthy, c.1996-2001
- Ken Morrison, c.2002
- James E. Smith, 2002-2018
- Wilmot Collins, 2018-2026
- Emily Dean, 2026-present

== See also ==
- 2025 Helena mayoral election
- Helena history
