= 2025 Helena mayoral election =

- November 4, 2025

Candidate	Emily Dean	Andy Shirtliff	Sonda Gaub
Party	Nonpartisan	Nonpartisan	Nonpartisan
General	4,134	5,470	969
Runoff	5,440	5,237	Eliminated
Mayor before election
Wilmot Collins
Democratic
Elected mayor
Emily Dean
Nonpartisan

The 2025 Helena mayoral election took place on November 4, 2025 to elect the mayor of Helena, Montana. Incumbent mayor Wilmot Collins did not seek re-election to a third term. The primary election was held on September 9, 2025.

== Primary election ==
=== Candidates ===
==== Advanced to general ====
- Emily Dean, city commissioner
- Andy Shirtliff, city commissioner

==== Eliminated in primary ====
- Sonda Gaub, 2021 mayoral candidate
- Braxton Hudson, receptionist
- Chris Riccardo, ceramic artist

==== Declined ====
- Wilmot Collins, incumbent mayor

=== Endorsements ===
Emily Dean

Local officials

- Wilmot Collins, mayor of Helena (2018–present)

=== Results ===
2025 Helena mayoral election primary results
Party	Candidate	Votes	%
Nonpartisan	Andy Shirtliff	5,470	48.3%
Nonpartisan	Emily Dean	4,134	36.5%
Nonpartisan	Sonda Gaub	969	8.6%
Nonpartisan	Chris Riccardo	347	3.1%
Nonpartisan	Braxton Hudson	328	2.9%
Write-in		68	0.6%
Total votes		11,316	100.00%

== General election ==
=== Results ===
2025 Helena mayoral election results
Party	Candidate	Votes	%
Nonpartisan	Emily Dean	5,440	51.0%
Nonpartisan	Andy Shirtliff	5,237	49.0%
Total votes		10,677	100.00%
