= Bilal Hersi =

Somali footballer (born 2001)

Personal information
- Full name: Bilal Abdullahi Hersi
- Date of birth: 29 October 2001 (age 25)
- Place of birth: Decatur, Georgia, United States
- Height: 1.87 m (6 ft 2 in)
- Position: Forward

Team information
- Current team: New York Shockers
- Number: 6

Youth career
- Seacoast United Maine
- New England Revolution

College career
| Years | Team | Apps | (Gls) |
| 2020–2023 | Siena Saints | 60 | (12) |

Senior career*
| Years | Team | Apps | (Gls) |
| 2024 | Seacoast United Phantoms | 7 | (1) |
| 2024– | New York Shockers | | |

International career^{‡}
| 2020 | Somalia U20 | 2 | (0) |
| 2022– | Somalia | 1 | (0) |
- * Club domestic league appearances and goals as of 20 March 2025 ‡ National team caps and goals as of 16:00, 28 March 2022 (UTC)

Bilal Abdullahi Hersi (born 29 October 2001) is a footballer who plays as a forward for the New York Shockers in the National Premier Soccer League. Born in the United States, he plays for the Somalia national team.

== Club career ==
Born in Decatur, Georgia, in the United States, Hersi attended Lewiston High School in Lewiston, Maine, captaining the side for two years. Before Hersi attended Siena College, he played for Seacoast United Maine and New England Revolution at youth level. In 2020, Hersi scored one goal in eight games for the Siena Saints. The following year, Hersi scored five goals in 19 appearances for the Siena Saints.

In 2024, Hersi played with Secoast United Phantoms in USL League Two. He scored the winning goal for the Phantoms in 2024 USL League Two championship game.

Hersi also joined the New York Shockers of the National Premier Soccer League in 2024. He was with the club in April, and also in March 2025 during the 2025 U.S. Open Cup.

== International career ==
In November 2020, Hersi was called up for Somalia's under-20 squad for the country's 2021 Africa U-20 Cup of Nations qualification campaign.

On 23 March 2022, Hersi made his debut for Somalia in a 3–0 loss against Eswatini in the qualification for the 2023 Africa Cup of Nations.

== Personal life ==
Bilal's young brother, Khalid, is also a professional footballer. He plays as a midfielder for the USL League One team Portland Hearts of Pine.
