= List of foreign-born French people =

This is a list of notable French people who were born outside present-day Metropolitan France or Overseas France.

== A ==
- Adel Abdessemed - contemporary artist, born in Constantine, Algeria
- Lucien Agoumé - footballer, born in Yaounde, Cameroon
- Vincent Aka-Akesse – wrestler, born in N'zi-Comoé, Côte d'Ivoire
- Louis Althusser - Marxist philosopher, born in Bir Mourad Raïs, French Algeria (now Algeria)
- Amine - singer, born in Casablanca, Morocco
- Florent Amodio - figure skating coach, and former competitor, born in Sobral, Brazil
- Manuel Anatol – footballer, born in Irun, Spain
- Anggun – singer-songwriter, born in Jakarta, Indonesia
- Guillaume Apollinaire - poet, playwright, writer, novelist, and art critic, born in Rome, Kingdom of Italy (now Italy)
- Rachid Arhab - journalist and a member of the Conseil supérieur de l'audiovisuel (CSA), born in Larbaâ Nath Irathen, French Algeria (now Algeria)
- Aure Atika - actress, writer, and director, born in Estoril, Portugal
- Arthur - TV presenter, born in Casablanca, Morocco
- Yvan Attal - actor, scriptwriter, and film director, born in Tel Aviv, Israel
- Jacques Attali - economic and social theorist, writer, political adviser and senior civil servant, born in Algiers, French Algeria (now Algeria)
- John James Audubon, self-trained artist, naturalist, and ornithologist, born in Les Cayes, Saint-Domingue (now Haiti)
- Anne of Austria - Queen of France from 1615 to 1643, born in Valladolid, Kingdom of Spain (now Spain)
- Marie Antoinette of Austria - Queen of France from 1774 to 1792, born in Vienna, Archduchy of Austria, Holy Roman Empire (now Austria)
- Daniel Auteuil - actor, and director, born in Algiers, French Algeria (now Algeria)

== B ==
- Jean-Pierre Bacri - actor, and screenwriter, born in Bou Ismaïl, French Algeria (now Algeria)
- Auguste of Baden-Baden - Duchess of Orléans - born in Aschaffenburg, Electorate of Bavaria (now Germany)
- Mansour Bahrami – tennis player, born in Arak, Imperial State of Iran (now Iran)
- Josephine Baker - dancer, singer, and actress, born in St. Louis, Missouri, United States
- Édouard Balladur – former Prime Minister of France, born in Izmir, Turkey
- Isabeau of Bavaria - Queen of France from 1385 to 1422, born in Munich, Electorate of Bavaria (now Germany)
- Maria Anna Victoria of Bavaria - Dauphine of France from 1680 to 1690, born in Munich, Electorate of Bavaria (now Germany)
- Sophie Charlotte in Bavaria - Duchess of Alençon, born in Pöcking, Kingdom of Bavaria (now Germany)
- Guy Bedos - actor, screenwriter, and comedian, born in Algiers, French Algeria (now Algeria)
- Bérénice Bejo - actress, born in Buenos Aires, Argentina
- Abdelatif Benazzi - former rugby union player, born in Oujda, Morocco
- Astrid Bergès-Frisbey - actress, and model, born in Barcelona, Spain
- Serge Betsen - former rugby union player, born in Kumba, Cameroon
- Jane Birkin - actress, singer, and designer, born in Marylebone, England, United Kingdom
- Serge Blanco - former rugby union rugby, born in Caracas, Venezuela
- Frida Boccara - singer, born in Casablanca, French Morocco (now Morocco)
- Aliette de Bodard - writer, born in New York City, New York, United States
- Isabelle Boni-Claverie - author, screenwriter, and film director, born in Tiassalé, Ivory Coast
- Michel Boujenah - actor, comedian, film director, and screenwriter, born in Tunis, French Tunisia (now Tunisia)
- Jean-Alain Boumsong - former footballer, born in Douala, Cameroon
- Maria Carolina of Bourbon-Two Sicilies - Duchess of Aumale, born in Vienna, Austrian Empire (now Austria)
- Didier Bourdon - actor, screenwriter, and film director, born in Algiers, French Algeria (now Algeria)
- Sofia Boutella - actress, dancer, and model, born in Bab El Oued, Algeria
- Marie of Brabant - Queen of France from 1274 to 1285, born in Leuven, Duchy of Brabant, Holy Roman Empire (now Belgium)
- Constantin Brâncuși – sculptor, painter, and photographer, born in Hobița, Romania
- Francisca of Brazil - Princess of Joinville, born in Rio de Janeiro, Empire of Brazil (now Brazil)
- Patrick Bruel - singer, songwriter, actor and professional poker player, born in Tlemcen, French Algeria (now Algeria)
- Carla Bruni – model, singer, former first lady of France, born in Turin, Italy
- Ettore Bugatti - automobile designer, and manufacturer, born in Milan, Kingdom of Italy (now Italy)
- Khatia Buniatishvili - concert pianist, born in Batumi, Georgian SSR (now Georgia)

== C ==
- Eduardo Camavinga - footballer, born in Cabinda, Angola
- Albert Camus - philosopher, writer, author, journalist, and political activist, born in Dréan, French Tunisia (now Algeria)µ
- Pierre Cardin - fashion designer, born in San Biagio di Callalta, Kingdom of Italy (now Italy)
- Amira Casar - actress, born in London, England, United Kingdom
- Ana Cata-Chitiga - basketball player, born in Bucharest, Romania
- Alain Chabat - actor, comedian, director, screenwriter, producer and television presenter, born in Oran, French Algeria (now Algeria)
- Timothée Chalamet - actor, born in New York City, New York, United States
- Frédéric Chau - actor, born in Ho Chi Minh City, Vietnam
- Jacques Cheminade – politician, born in Buenos Aires, Argentina
- François Cheng - academician, writer, peot, and calligrapher, born in Nanchang, China
- Frédéric François Chopin - composer and virtuoso pianist, born in, Żelazowa Wola, Poland
- William Christie – musician, born in Buffalo, New York, United States
- Amal Clooney - international human rights lawyer, born in Beirut, Lebanon
- George Clooney - actor and filmmaker, born in Lexington, Kentucky, United States
- Alexandre Colonna-Walewski Count of the Empire and the unacknowledged son of Napoleon Bonaparte - born in Walewice, Duchy of Warsaw (now Poland)
- Julio Cortázar - novelist, short story writer, poet, essayist, and translator, born in Ixelles, Belgium
- Cristina Córdula - television presenter, fashion consultant, and former fashion model, born in Rio de Janeiro, Brazil
- Sergio Coronado - politician, born in Osorno, Chile
- Dorothea of Courland - Duchess of Dino, Talleyrand and Sagan, born in Friedrichsfelde, Prussia (now Germany)
- Marie Curie – physicist, chemist, born in Warsaw, Kingdom of Poland (now Poland)

== D ==
- Vencelas Dabaya – weightlifter, born in Kumba, Cameroon
- Dalida – singer, born in Cairo, Egypt (now Egypt)
- Joe Dassin - singer, and songwriter, born in New York City, New York, United States
- Anne-Marie David - singer, born in Casablanca, French Morocco (now Morocco)
- Hind Dehiba - runner, born in Bejaâd, Morocco
- Marcel Desailly - former footballer, born in Accra, Ghana
- Antoinette Nana Djimou - heptathlete and pentathlete, born in Douala, Cameroon
- Leonora Dori - courtier, born in Florence, Grand Duchy of Tuscany (now Italy)
- Cédric Doumbé - professional mixed martial artist and former kickboxer, born in Douala, Cameroon
- Diam's - rapper, born in Nicosia, Cyprus
- Didier Drogba – footballer, born in Abidjan, Ivory Coast
- Filippa Duci - noblewoman and mistress of Henry II of France, born in Moncalieri, Savoyard state (now Italy)
- Thomas-Alexandre Dumas - army officier, born in Jérémie, Saint-Domingue (now Haiti)
- Marguerite Duras - novelist, playwright, screenwriter, essayist, and experimental filmmaker, born in Saigon, French Cochinchina (now Vietnam)

== E ==
- Virginie Efira - actress, born in Brussels, Belgium
- Myriam El Khomri - politician, born in Rabat, Morocco
- Gad Elmaleh - comedian, and actor, born in Casablanca, Morocco
- Boughera El Ouafi - athlete, born in Ouled Djellal, French Algeria (now Algeria)
- Zineb El Rhazoui - journalist, born in Casablanca, Morocco
- Gévrise Émane - judoka, born in Yaounde, Cameroon
- Henrietta of England - Duchess of Orléans, born in Exeter, England (now United Kingdom)
- Deniz Gamze Ergüven - film director, born in Ankara, Turkey
- Sofia Essaïdi - singer, and actress, born in Casablanca, Morocco
- Maria Teresa Felicitas d'Este - Duchess of Penthièvre, born in Modena, Modena (now Italy)
- Patrice Evra – footballer, born in Dakar, Senegal

== F ==
- Golshifteh Farahani - actress, born in Teheran, Imperial State of Iran (now Iran)
- Mylène Farmer - singer, and songwriter, born in Montreal, Quebec, Canada
- Luis Fernandez - football manager, and former footballer, born in Tarifa, Spain
- Penelope Fillon - Former politician, born in Llanover, Wales, United Kingdom
- Tsuguharu Foujita - painter, born in Tokyo, Japan
- Laurence Fournier Beaudry - ice dancer, born in Montreal, Quebec, Canada
- Claude François - singer, composer, songwriter, record producer, drummer, and dancer, born in Ismailia, Egypt (now Egypt)

== G ==
- Charlotte Gainsbourg - singer, and actress, born in London, England, United Kingdom
- Adelina Galyavieva - ice dancer, born in Kazan, Russia
- Erol Gelenbe - computer scientist, electronic engineer, and applied mathematician, born in Istanbul, Turkey
- Franz-Olivier Giesbert - journalist, author, and TV presenter, born in Wilmington, Delaware, United States
- Chantal Goya - singer, and actress, born in Saigon, French Cochinchina (now Vietnam)
- Catherine Grand - courtesan and noblewoman, born in Tranquebar, Danish India (now India)
- Greg – cartoonist, born in Ixelles, Belgium
- Élisabeth Guigou – politician, born in Marrakesh, French Morocco (now Morocco)

== H ==
- Gisèle Halimi - lawyer, politician, essayist, and feminist, Tunis, French Tunisia (now Tunisia)
- Rima Hassan - Jurist and politician, Neirab camp, Aleppo, Syria
- Olivia de Havilland - actress, born in Tokyo, Japan (to British parents)
- Émile Henry - individualist and illegalist anarchist militant and terrorist, born in Barcelona, Spain
- Anne Hidalgo – Mayor of Paris, born in San Fernando, Spain
- Clementia of Hungary - Queen of France and Navarre from 1315 to 1316, born in Naples, Kingdom of Naples (now Italy)

== I ==
- Eugène Ionesco – playwright, born in Slatina, Romania

== J ==
- Vanessa James - pair skater, born in Scarborough, Ontario, Canada
- Alejandro Jodorowsky - filmmaker, born in Tocopilla, Chile
- Eva Joly – politician, born in Grünerløkka, Oslo, Norway
- Lloyd Jones – ice skater, born in Cardiff, Wales, United Kingdom

== K ==
- Anna Karina - actress, model, director, writer, and singer, born in Frederiksberg, Denmark
- Roger Karoutchi - politician, and teacher, born in Casablanca, French Morocco (now Morocco)
- Tchéky Karyo - actor, and musician, born in Istanbul, Turkey
- Abdellatif Kechiche - film director, screenwriter, and actor, born in Tunis, Tunisia
- Jirès Kembo Ekoko - former footballer, born in Kinshasa, Zaire (now Democratic Republic of the Congo)
- Khaled - singer, musician, and songwriter, born in Oran, French Algeria (now Algeria)
- Lyna Khoudri - actress, born in Algiers, Algeria
- Margaret Kelly - dancer, born in Dublin, Great Britain and Ireland (now Ireland)
- Pom Klementieff - actress, born in Quebec City, Quebec, Canada
- Pavel Kovalev - figure skater, born in Saint Petersburg, Russia
- Olga Kurylenko - actress, born in Berdiansk, Ukrainian SSR (now Ukraine)

== L ==
- Ariane Labed - actress, and film director, born in Athens, Greece
- Joseph-Louis Lagrange - mathematician, physicist, and astronomer, born in Turin, Kingdom of Sardinia (now Italy)
- Joël Lautier - chess grandmaster, born in Scarborough, Ontario, Canada
- Pierre Lellouche – politician, born in Tunis, French Tunisia (now Tunisia)
- Axelle Lemaire – lawyer and former politician, born in Ottawa, Ontario, Canada
- Marie Leszczyńska - Queen of France from 1725 to 1768, born in Trzebnica, Duchy of Oels (now Poland)
- Evgeniia Lopareva - ice dancer, born in Moscow, Russia
- Jean-Baptiste Lully - composer, dancer, and instrumentalist, born in Florence, Grand Duchy of Tuscany (now Italy)
- Bonne of Luxembourg - wife of the Crown Prince of France, born in Prague, Bohemia (now Czech Republic)

== M ==
- Amin Maalouf - author, born in Beirut, Lebanon
- Ibrahim Maalouf - trumpeter, producer, arranger, and composer, born in Beirut, Lebanon
- Enrico Macias - singer, songwriter, and musician, born in Constantine, French Algeria
- Aïssa Maïga - actress, director, writer, producer, and activist, born in Dakar, Senegal
- Claude Makélélé - former footballer, born in Kinshasa, Zaire (now Democratic Republic of the Congo)
- Steve Mandanda - footballer, born in Kinshasa, Zaire (now Democratic Republic of the Congo)
- Véronique Mang - track and field sprint athlete, born in Douala, Cameroon
- Roxana Maracineanu - politician, born in Bucharest, Romania
- Guy Mardel - singer, born in Oran, French Algeria (now Algeria)
- Sara Martins - actress, born in, Faro, Portugal
- Jeanne Mas - singer, born in Alicante, Spain
- Cardinal Mazarin - Catholic prelate, diplomat and politician, born in Pescina, Kingdom of Naples (now Italy)
- Loïc Mbe Soh - footballer, born in Nanga Eboko, Cameroon
- Helene of Mecklenburg-Schwerin - French Crown Princess from 1837 to 1842, born in Ludwigslust, Duchy of Mecklenburg-Schwerin (now Germany)
- Mounia Meddour - film director, born in Moscow, Soviet Union (now Russia)
- Elli Medeiros - singer, and actress, born in Montevideo, Uruguay
- Catherine de'Medici - Queen of France from 1547 to 1559, born in Florence, Republic of Florence (now Italy)
- Marie de' Medici - Queen of France from 1600 to 1610, born in Florence, Grand Duchy of Tuscany (now Italy)
- Jean-Luc Mélenchon – politician, born in Tangier International Zone (now Tangier, Morocco)
- Kad Merad - actor, and writer, born in Sidi Bel Abbès, French Algeria (now Algeria)
- Jean Messiha - economist, media personality, politician and senior civil servant, born in Cairo, Egypt
- Radu Mihăileanu - film director, and screenwriter, born in Bucharest, Romania
- Yves Montand - singer, and actor, born in Monsummano Terme, Kingdom of Italy (now Italy)
- Eugénie de Montijo - Empress of the French from 1853 to 1870, born in Granada, Spain
- Marie Myriam - singer, born in Kananga, Belgian Congo (now Democratic Republic of the Congo)

== N ==
- Nagui - TV and radio personality, born in Alexandria, Egypt
- Aya Nakamura - singer, and songwriter, born in Bamako, Mali
- Maria Amalia of Naples and Sicily - Queen of the French from 1830 to 1846, born in Caserta, Kingdom of Naples (now Italy)
- Joakim Noah - former basketball player, born in New York City, New York, United States
- Francis Ngannou - professional mixed martial artist, and professional boxer, born in Batié, Cameroon

== O ==
- Michael Olise - footballer, born in London, England, United Kingdom
- Ferdinand-Philippe of Orléans - French Crown Prince from 1830 to 1842, born in Palermo, Kingdom of Sicily (now Italy)
- Marie Isabelle of Orléans - Countess of Paris, born in Seville, Spain

== P ==
- La Païva - courtesan, born in Moscow, Russian Empire (now Russia)
- Elizabeth Charlotte of Palatinate - Duchess of Orléans, born in Heidelberg, Electoral Palatinate (now Germany)
- Tony Parker - former basketball player, born in Bruges, Belgium
- Fleur Pellerin – politician, born in Seoul, South Korea
- Mary Pierce - former tennis player, born in Montreal, Quebec, Canada
- Julie Pietri - singer, born in Algiers, French Algeria (now Algeria)
- Camille Pissarro - painter, born in Charlotte Amalie, U.S. Virgin Islands, Danish West Indies (now U.S. Virgin Islands)
- Jean-Vincent Placé - politician, born in Seoul, South Korea
- Kleofina Pnishi - model and beauty pageant titleholder, born in Gjakova, Serbia and Montenegro (now Kosovo)
- Axel Poniatowski - politician, born in Rabat, French Morocco (now Morocco)
- Carlo Ponti – film producer, born in Magenta, Lombardy, Italy
- Elvira Popescu - actress, born in Bucharest, Romania

== R ==
- Jean Reno - actor, born in Casablanca, French Morocco (now Morocco)
- Sonia Rolland - actress, and beauty pageant titleholder who was crowned Miss France 2000, born in Kigali, Rwanda
- Ségolène Royal – politician, born in Dakar, French West Africa (now Senegal)

== S ==
- Yves Saint-Laurent - fashion designer, born in Oran, French Algeria (now Algeria)
- Brice Samba - footballer, born in Linzolo, Republic of the Congo
- Marjane Satrapi - comic book author, film director, and children's book author, born in Rasht, Imperial State of Iran (now Iran)
- Megumi Satsu - singer, born in Sapporo, Japan
- Pierre Savorgnan de Brazza, explorer, born in Rome, Papal States (now Italy)
- Marie Adélaïde of Savoy - Dauphine of France from 1711 to 1712, born in Turin, Savoyard state (now Italy)
- Marie Joséphine of Savoy - Countess of Provence, and titular Queen of France from 1795 to 1910, born in Turin, Savoyard state (now Italy)
- Maria Theresa of Savoy - Countess of Artois, born in Turin, Savoyard state (now Italy)
- Marie Thérèse Louise of Savoy - Princess of Lamballe, born in Turin, Savoyard state (now Italy)
- Maria Josepha of Saxony - Dauphine of France from 1747 to 1765, born in Dresden, Electorate of Saxony (now Germany)
- Victoria of Saxe-Coburg and Gotha - Duchess of Nemour, born in Vienna, Austrian Empire (now Austria)
- Romy Schneider - actress, born in Vienna, German Reich (now Austria)
- Philippe Séguin - political figure, born in Tunis, French Tunisia (now Tunisia)
- Countess of Ségur - Writer, born in Saint Petersburg, Russian Empire (now Russia)
- Simone Signoret - actress, born in Wiesbaden, Weimar Republic (now Germany)
- Thiago Silva - footballer, born in Rio de Janeiro, Brazil
- Joseph Sitruk - Chief Rabbi of France, born in Tunis, French Tunisia (now Tunisia)
- Maria Theresa of Spain - Queen of France from 1660 to 1683, born in Madrid, Kingdom of Spain (now Spain)
- María Teresa Rafaela of Spain - Dauphine of France from 1744 to 1746, born in Madrid, Kingdom of Spain (now Spain)
- Margaret Stewart - Dauphine of France from 1436 to 1445, born in Perth, Scotland (now United Kingdom)
- Igor Stravinsky – composer, born in Saint Petersburg, Russian Empire (now Russia)
- Denys Strekalin, figure skater, born in Simferopol, Ukraine
- Linda de Suza - singer, born in Beringel, Portugal

== T ==
- Kenzō Takada – fashion designer, born in Himeji, Hyōgo, Japan
- Carlos Takam - boxer, born in Douala, Cameroon
- Tal - singer, born in Hadera, Israel
- Khéphren Thuram - footballer, born in Reggio Emilia, Italy
- Marcus Thuram - footballer, born in Parma, Italy
- Henri de Tonti - military officer, and explorer, born in Gaeta, Kingdom of Naples (now Italy)
- Tristan Tzara - journalist, playwright, literary and art critic, composer, and film director, born in Moinești, Romania

== U ==
- Uffie - singer, songwriter, rapper, and DJ, born in Miami, Florida, United States
- Joseph Ujlaki - footballer, born in Budapest, Hungary
- Samuel Umtiti - footballer, born in Yaoundé, Cameroon

== V ==
- Virimi Vakatawa - rugby player, born in Rangiora, New Zealand
- Najat Vallaud-Belkacem – politician, born in Bni Chiker, Morocco
- Manuel Valls – former Prime Minister of France, born in Barcelona, Spain
- Agnès Varda - film director, screenwriter and photographer, born in Ixelles, Belgium
- Sylvie Vartan - singer, and actress, born in Iskrets, Bulgaria
- Anamaria Vartolomei - actress, born in Bacău, Romania
- Patrick Vieira - football manager, and former footballer, born in Dakar, Senegal
- Sashina Vignes Waran - badminton player, born in Kuala Lumpur, Malaysia
- Marthe Villalonga - actress, born in Bordj El Kiffan, French Algeria (now Algeria)
- Rolando Villazón - operatic tenor, stage director, author, and artistic director, Ciudad Satélite, Mexico
- Dominique de Villepin - politician, born in Rabat, French Morocco (now Morocco)
- Valentina Visconti - Duchess of Orléans, born in Pavia, Duchy of Milan (now Italy)
- Matei Vișniec - playwright, poet and journalist, born in Rădăuți, Socialist Republic of Romania (now Romania)

== W ==
- Mami Watta - drag performer, born in Abidjan, Ivory Coast
- Edmond Weiskopf - footballer, born in Budapest, Austria-Hungary (now Hungary)
- Wendelin Werner - mathematician, born in Cologne, West Germany (now Germany)
- Charles Terres Weymann - aeroplane racing pilot, and businessman, born in Port-au-Prince, Haiti
- Georges Wolinski - cartoonist, and comics writer, born in Tunis, French Tunisia (now Tunisia)
- Louis Wolowski - writer on economics and politician, born in Warsaw, Duchy of Warsaw (now Poland)
- Walery Antoni Wróblewski - revolutionary, politician and soldier, born in Zhaludok, Russian Empire (now Belarus)

== Y ==
- Rama Yade – politician, born in Ouakam, Dakar, Senegal
- Mapou Yanga-Mbiwa - footballer, born in Bangui, Central African Republic
- Yiqing Yin - Haute couture designer, born in Beijing, China
- Youssoupha - rapper, born in Kinshasa, Zaire (now Democratic Republic of the Congo)
- Jia Nan Yuan - table tennis player, born in Zhengzhou, China

== Z ==
- Carolle Zahi - sprinter, born in Bingerville, Ivory Coast
- Zhang Chongren – artist and sculptor, born in Xujiahui, Shanghai, China
