= Safiya Khalid =

Somali-American politician

Member of the Lewiston City Council
- In office January 6, 2020 – January 3, 2022

Personal details
- Born: 1996 (age 29–30) Somalia
- Party: Democratic
- Education: University of Southern Maine (BA) Northeastern University (MPP)

Safiya Said Khalid (born 1996) is a Somali-American politician who served as a member of the Lewiston, Maine, City Council.

== Early years and education ==
Khalid was born in Somalia. As a seven-year-old, Khalid fled the country with her mother and two younger brothers. Her family initially settled in New Jersey, before moving to Lewiston, Maine. At fourteen years old, she became an American citizen. She attended Lewiston Public Schools and graduated from Lewiston High School. Khalid went on to graduate from the University of Southern Maine, where she studied psychology. Khalid studied public policy at Northeastern University.

== Career ==
Khalid worked for L.L.Bean making boots during high school and college. After graduating, she worked for the Maine Democratic Party as a field organizer in Lewiston. She later worked as a clerk for the Maine Legislature's Committee on Housing and Labor. She currently works as the executive director of Community Organizing Alliance.

=== Politics ===
In 2017, Khalid ran for the Lewiston School Committee. She lost to the incumbent by a wide margin. Shortly after the election, she was elected as vice chair of the Lewiston Democratic Party.

In 2018, Khalid won a seat representing Androscoggin County on the Maine Democratic Party State Committee. She went on to be elected to the Maine Democratic Party Executive Committee.

In 2019, Khalid ran for the Lewiston City Council. On November 5, 2019, Khalid won the election with nearly 70 percent of the vote. Khalid took office on January 6, 2020. She serves on the Lewiston Finance Committee, Lewiston Housing Committee, and the Community Development Block Grant Committee.

Khalid served as vice chair of the Lewiston Democratic Party. She endorsed Bernie Sanders during the 2020 Democratic Party presidential primaries and served as one of his Maine co-chairs. After Sanders dropped out of the race, she endorsed Joe Biden.

In 2021, Khalid ran for chair of the Lewiston Democratic Party seeking to succeed outgoing Chair Kiernan Majerus-Collins. After facing hostility and racist comments at a party meeting, she withdrew from the race.

== Election results ==
2019 Lewiston, Maine general election: City Council Ward 1
Party	Candidate	Votes	%	±%
Democratic	Safiya Khalid	642	69.6	NA
Democratic	Walter Hill	280	30.4	NA

2017 Lewiston, Maine general election: School Committee At-Large
Party	Candidate	Votes	%	±%
Independent	Megan Parks	6,694	71.9	NA
Democratic	Safiya Khalid	2,619	28.1	NA
