= Joseph W. Jourdan =

American politician

Joseph W. Jourdan served in the California legislature in 1875-76 and was born in Australia.
