= J. Robert Carrier =

American politician

J. Robert Carrier (June 29, 1925 – January 30, 2016) was an American politician from Maine. Carrier, a Democrat from Westbrook, served eight terms in the Maine House of Representatives between 1967 and 1986. First elected in 1966, he was re-elected three times and left the Legislature at the end of 1974. He returned to elected office in 1977 and continued until 1986.

Carrier was born in Lewiston and graduated from Lewiston High School. After graduating, he served in the Merchant Marines during World War II. He was also a Golden Gloves boxer. He earned a degree in business administration from the University of Maine while working at Westbrook's S. D. Warren Paper Mill. He worked the night shift at the mill in order to attend the University of Maine School of Law in Portland, where he was part of its original graduating class.
