= Gregorio Matías Rosario =

Puerto Rican politician

Majority Leader of the Puerto Rico Senate
- Incumbent
- Assumed office January 2, 2025
- Preceded by: Javier Aponte Dalmau

Member of the Puerto Rico Senate from the at-large district
- Incumbent
- Assumed office May 28, 2020

Personal details
- Born: April 2, 1972 (age 54) Dominican Republic
- Party: New Progressive
- Other political affiliations: Republican
- Education: John Jay College (AA); University of Puerto Rico, Río; Piedras (attended)
- Police career
- Department: Puerto Rico Police
- Rank: Second lieutenant

Gregorio Matías Rosario (born April 2, 1972 in the Dominican Republic) is a Puerto Rican politician. He currently serves as at-large senator and Majority Leader in the Senate of Puerto Rico.

== Education and Police career ==
He earned an Associate Degree in Criminal Justice from John Jay College of Criminal Justice of the State University of New York. For 28 years, he served the people as a member of the Puerto Rico Police, being recognized fourteen times. He was promoted to the rank of Sergeant and later to the rank of Lieutenant II. During his career as a union leader, he served as Vice President of the Association of Organized Police Officers.

== Politics ==
On August 9, 2020, he was favored in the New Progressive Party Primaries, and in the General Elections on November 3, 2020, he was elected as Senator at Large. He was reelected in the 2024 elections. He became Majority Leader of the Puerto Rico Senate.

Senate of Puerto Rico
Preceded by Javier Aponte Dalmau	Majority Leader of the Puerto Rico Senate; 2025–present	Incumbent
