= Lewiston Public Schools =

School district

Location
- Lewiston, Maine; United States

District information
- Superintendent: Jake Langlais

Other information
- Website: www.lewistonpublicschools.org

Lewiston Public Schools (LPS) is a school district headquartered in Lewiston, Maine, USA.

== Demographics ==
As of 2014 the district has over 5,000 students. The most common non-English language spoken by students is Somali, with speakers making up 90% of the district's students who do not have English as a native language. The remainder speak about 23 other languages. Out of the total student body the percentage which qualifies for free or reduced lunches is 69%.

== Schools ==
- Lewiston High School
- Lewiston Middle School
  - As of 2015 there are 775 students, 20% of them being Somali Americans.

Elementary schools:

- Farwell Elementary School
- Raymond A. Geiger Elementary School
- Robert V. Connors Elementary School
- Thomas J. McMahon Elementary School
- Montello Elementary School

Others:

- Lewiston Regional Technical Center
- Lewiston Adult Education
- Next Step High School
- RootED (affiliated with Tree Street Youth)

== Leadership ==
The Lewiston School Committee is the governing body of Lewiston Public Schools. Its members are:

- Luke Jensen (At Large)
- Scott Harriman (City Council Representative)
- Phoenix McLaughlin (Ward 1)
- Janet Beaudoin (Ward 2)
- Elizabeth Eames (Ward 3)
- Julia Harper (Ward 4)
- Lynnea Hawkins (Ward 5)
- Meghan Hird (Ward 6)
- Emily Levasseur (Ward 7)

The School Committee hires and oversees the superintendent. Since 2020, the superintendent of Lewiston Public Schools has been Jake Langlais.
