= Lewiston High School (Maine) =

Location
- 157 East Avenue; Lewiston, Maine; United States; 44°05′36″N 70°12′01″W

Information
- Type: Public Secondary
- Motto: "Home of the Blue Devils"
- Established: 1850; 176 years ago
- School district: Lewiston Public Schools
- CEEB code: 200550
- Principal: Jonathan Radtke
- Faculty: 137
- Teaching staff: 108.00 (FTE)
- Grades: 9–12
- Enrollment: 1,645 (2023–2024)
- Student to teacher ratio: 15.23
- Colors: Blue and white
- Mascot: Blue Devil
- Rival: Edward Little High School
- Newspaper: Indigo Ink
- Yearbook: Folio
- Website: http://lhs.lewistonpublicschools.org/

Lewiston High School (LHS) is a public high school in Lewiston, Maine, United States. The school was founded in 1850 and has occupied its current building since 1973.The school mascot is the Blue Devil and the colors are blue and white. The new principal is Jonathan Radtke. From the 1930s to 1973 the high school was located on Central Ave and that building currently serves as Lewiston Middle School.

== Sports ==
Lewiston competes in Maine's Class A division for sports, the highest class in the state (except for basketball, which competes in AA), as governed by the Maine Principals' Association. Lewiston is also a member of the Kennebec Valley Athletic Conference. The school is particularly known for its cheerleading and boys soccer teams.

=== Boys soccer ===
Lewiston's Blue Devils boys soccer team won the state championships in 2015 and 2017 under coach Mike McGraw. The team won again in 2023 under coach Dan Gish, shortly after the mass shooting that devastated the community. The story of Somali immigrants to Maine and how their passion for soccer led Lewiston to their first state championship title in 2015 is told in the 2018 book One Goal by Amy Bass.

== Notable alumni ==
- Mana Abdi, State Representative (class of 2014)
- Tom Caron, sports broadcaster
- J. Robert Carrier, State Representative
- Bill Carrigan, Major League Baseball catcher and manager
- Thomas E. Delahanty, Justice of Maine Supreme Judicial Court (class of 1932)
- Thomas E. Delahanty II, United States Attorney (class of 1963)
- Mark Dion, Mayor of Portland
- Isaiah Harris, middle-distance runner (class of 2015)
- Bilal Hersi, soccer player
- Safiya Khalid, member of the Lewiston City Council
- Michel Lajoie, State Representative
- Paul LePage, Governor of Maine
- Susan Longley, State Senator and Judge of Probate (class of 1974)
- Harry Manser, Justice of Maine Supreme Judicial Court (class of 1893)
- James L. Nelson, novelist (class of 1980)

== Lewiston Regional Technical Center ==
Lewiston High School is also the home to the Lewiston Regional Technical Center. LRTC is the second largest vocational technical center in Maine. It offers programs in automotive technology, computer technology, health careers, criminal justice, culinary arts, nursing, and many other fields. The school serves over 800 students from six area high schools: Lewiston High School, Edward Little High School, Lisbon High School, Oak Hill High School, Leavitt Area High School, and Poland Regional High School.
