= Wilmot Collins =

Liberian-American politician (born 1963)

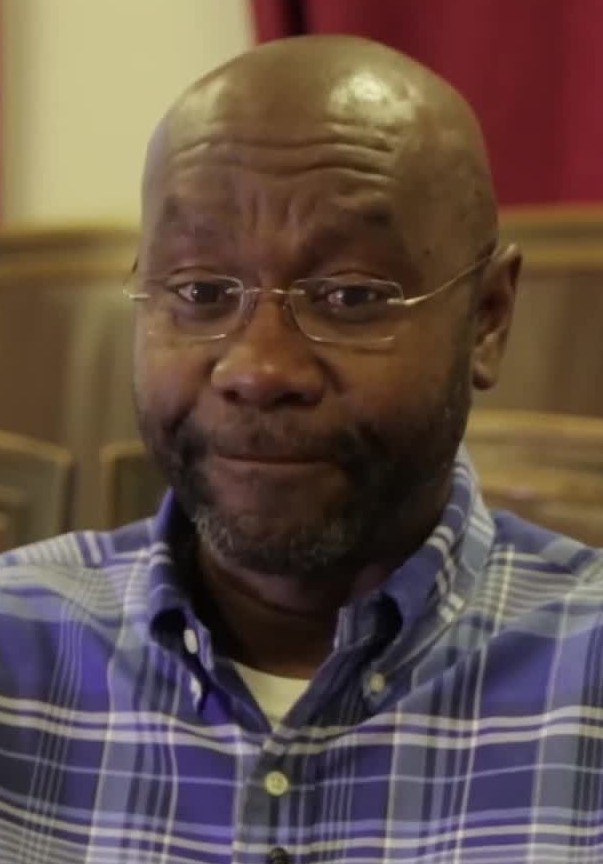
- Collins in 2018

40th Mayor of Helena
- In office January 2, 2018 – January 5, 2026
- Preceded by: James Smith
- Succeeded by: Emily Dean

Personal details
- Born: October 15, 1963 (age 63) Monrovia, Liberia
- Party: Independent (before 2019); Democratic (2019–present)
- Spouse: Maddie Muna (m. 1991)
- Children: 2
- Education: University of Liberia (BA); Troy University (MS)

Wilmot Collins (born October 15, 1963) is an American politician and former mayor of Helena, Montana. He defeated four-term incumbent mayor James E. Smith in the 2017 mayoral election on November 7, 2017, with 51% of the vote. This victory made him the first person of color to be elected the mayor of any city in the history of Montana since statehood was achieved in 1889. (Note: In 1873, pre-statehood Montana elected the first Black mayor of any city in the territory of Montana with the election of E. T. Johnson, a Black barber from Washington, D.C. Johnson's victory occurred before Montana had become a state or Helena had been officially incorporated as a city.) Born in Liberia, he came to the United States as a refugee during the First Liberian Civil War.

== Early life and background ==
Collins fled his native Liberia for Helena in 1994 as a refugee from the First Liberian Civil War. He had petitioned for refugee status to join his wife, who had moved to Montana two years before he did. He subsequently became a United States citizen in 2002, and worked for the Montana Department of Health and Human Services, specializing in child protection.

For over two decades, he served as a member of the United States Armed Forces, including 14 years in the Army Reserve (working in human resources and the Office of Casualty Affairs), and eight years in the Navy Reserve as a logistics specialist. Collins has two children with his wife, their daughter, Jaymie and their son, Bliss. Wilmot Collins is first cousins with Helene Cooper, Pentagon correspondent for The New York Times.

== Political career ==
Video from Voice of America News pursuant to Collins' election in 2017.

On May 13, 2019, Collins announced his candidacy for United States Senate as a Democrat. He dropped out to endorse governor Steve Bullock on March 9, 2020.

On March 29, 2021, Collins announced his intent to seek re-election as mayor of Helena. In his announcement, Collins listed climate friendly policies for the city, affordable housing and funding of essential services as his core accomplishments during his first term.

Collins won re-election as mayor of Helena on November 2, 2021. He defeated his opponent, Sonda Gaub with 67% of the vote, making him the first black person to win re-election for any office in the state of Montana.

In 2021, Collins spoke in support of resettling Afghan refugees amid the 2021 Taliban offensive on Twitter, stating:

"This former refugee cannot wait to welcome them to Montana. Hopefully they’ll get involved in our communities and enrich our lives with their experiences and culture. Who knows, maybe one day some of them will even run for office!"

== See also ==
- List of mayors of Helena, Montana

== Notes ==
Political offices
| Preceded by James Smith | Mayor of Helena; 2018–2026 | Succeeded by Emily Dean |
