= Mana Abdi =

American politician

Member of the Maine House of Representatives
- Incumbent
- Assumed office December 7, 2022

Personal details
- Born: Mana Hared Abdi Kenya
- Party: Democratic
- Education: University of Maine at Farmington (BA)
- Website: Campaign website

Mana Hared Abdi is a Somali-American politician who is a member of the Maine House of Representatives representing District 95 in Lewiston.

Born in Kenya, Abdi is the youngest of eight siblings in an ethnically Somali family. She arrived as a refugee in the U.S. at age 11, originally settling in Kansas. In 2009, Abdi moved to Lewiston at the age of 13.

Abdi graduated from Lewiston High School in 2014 before earning a bachelor's degree in political science and international and global studies from the University of Maine at Farmington in 2018. She previously worked at the Office of Intercultural Education at Bates College.

Abdi is a member of the Maine Legislature's Criminal Justice and Public Safety Committee.

In 2026, Abdi declared her candidacy for the Maine Senate in District 21 after Senator Peggy Rotundo announced her retirement.
