= List of Haitian Americans =

This is a list of notable Haitian Americans, including both original immigrants who obtained American citizenship and their American descendants.

To be included in this list, the person must have a Wikipedia article showing they are Haitian American, or have references showing they are Haitian American and are notable.

== Academia ==
- Claudine Gay, Harvard University's first Black person and second woman to lead the university.
- Michel DeGraff, tenured professor at the Massachusetts Institute of Technology and a founding member of the Haitian Creole Academy
- Charles L. Reason, the first Black college professor in the United States; mathematician and linguist

== Artists ==
- John James Audubon, painter
- Jean-Michel Basquiat, artist
- Edouard Duval-Carrié, painter and sculptor
- Vladimir Cybil Charlier, visual artist
- Paul Gardère, visual artist
- Jackson Georges, painter, whose works have been on exhibit at the World Trade Art Gallery, the United Nations, and Mehu Gallery
- Edmonia Lewis, sculptor who gained fame and recognition in the international fine arts world
- Naudline Pierre (born 1989), painter of Haitian descent, lives in Brooklyn, New York
- Patrick H. Reason, engraver
- Kathia St. Hilaire (born 1995), visual artist
- Sacha Thébaud (1934–2004), a.k.a. "Tebó", artist, sculptor, architect, furniture designer born in Haiti and known for encaustics in international contemporary fine art
- Didier William, mixed-media painter

== Business ==
- Hurby Azor, hip-hop music producer
- Jean-Claude Brizard, former CEO of Chicago Public Schools
- Karen Civil, digital marketing strategist, entrepreneur, author; CEO of KarenCivil.com, Live Civil & CMO of Marathon Agency
- Suzanne de Passe, television, music and film producer; co-chairman of de Passe Jones Entertainment Group
- Mignon Faget, fine jewelry designer
- Reggie Fils-Aimé, former president of Nintendo America
- Ralph Gilles, automobile designer (Chrysler 300)
- Viter Juste, businessman, community leader and activist
- Danielle Laraque-Arena, first woman President of the State University of New York Upstate Medical University
- Emmanuel Fritz Paret, entrepreneur
- Monique Péan, fine jewelry designer
- Harve Pierre, President of Sean "Diddy" Combs' Bad Boy record company
- James Rosemond, former businessman involved in the rap music industry
- Mona Scott-Young, CEO of Monami Entertainment
- Dumarsais Simeus, owner of Simeus Foods
- Vince Valholla, hip-hop music producer
- Steven Victor, record executive, artist manager, music publisher, and A&R representative.

== Culinary arts ==
- Vanessa Cantave, co-founder and executive chef of the catering company Yum Yum

== Crime ==
- Kendall Francois, serial killer
- James Rosemond, "Jimmy Henchman", former businessman involved in the rap music industry; convicted drug trafficker
- Rudy Eugene, "Miami Zombie" He was American of Haitian descent through his immigrant parents
- Haitian Jack, "Jacques Agnant" A Haitian who had an infamous beef with American rapper Tupac Shakur

== Entertainment ==
=== Broadcasting ===
- Vladimir Duthiers, television news broadcaster
- Carmelau Monestime, community leader and Haitian Creole radio broadcaster
- Liliane Pierre-Paul, radio journalist famous for having a political dispute with Haitian Kompa artist turned politician Michel Martelly

=== Dancers ===
- Jean-Léon Destiné, dancer and choreographer
- Emmanuel Pierre-Antoine, dancer

=== Films and TV ===
- Eric André, actor and comedian (father is Haitian)
- Nadege August, actress
- Marlyne Barrett, actress
- Angelique Bates, actress best known for the Nickelodeon sketch-comedy series All That
- Garcelle Beauvais, actress, singer, model
- Michelle Buteau, stand-up comedian, actor
- Gabriel Casseus, actor
- Suzanne de Passe, television, music and film producer
- Alex Désert, actor
- Gary Dourdan, actor
- Mike Estime, actor
- Susan Fales-Hill, television producer, author, screenwriter
- Abner Genece, award-winning actor
- Hugues Gentillon, film director, screenwriter, and producer
- Meta Golding, actress
- Jamie Hector, actor
- Nikki M. James, Tony Award-winning actress and singer
- Kyle Jean-Baptiste, youngest actor and first black American actor to be cast as Jean Valjean in Les Misérables on Broadway
- Jimmy Jean-Louis, actor
- Vicky Jeudy, actress
- Jean-Claude La Marre, television actor, director, and film and writer
- Jerry Lamothe, screenwriter, director, producer, and actor
- Sal Masekela, television host, sports commentator, actor, and singer
- Trina McGee-Davis, actress
- Moxiie, singer
- Natalie Paul, actress
- Sharon Pierre-Louis, actress
- Josephine Premice, actress
- Sandra Prosper, actress
- Lela Rochon, actress
- Luka Sabbat, actor and model
- Da'Vinchi, actor
- Alisha Wainwright, actress

=== Media personalities ===
- Kai Cenat
- Sneako

=== Models ===
- Joanne Borgella, fashion model
- Mama Cax, fashion model, and disabled rights activist
- Alexandra Cheron, model
- Daphnée Duplaix, actress, model and former Playboy playmate
- Tyrone Edmond, fashion model
- Marjorie Vincent, Miss America 1991

=== Music ===
- Kodak Black, Rapper
- Gaelle Adisson, singer
- Jean Beauvoir, multi-Platinum singer-songwriter, producer
- Elijah Blake, songwriter and contemporary R&B musician
- Bibi Bourelly, singer and daughter of Jean-Paul Bourelly
- Jean-Paul Bourelly, jazz fusion and blues rock guitarist
- Won-G Bruny, rapper and entrepreneur
- Capone, rapper
- Casanova, rapper of Panamanian and Haitian descent
- Naïka, singer-songwriter
- Alan Cavé, kompa singer
- Andrew Cyrille, jazz drummer
- Jason Derulo, singer-songwriter
- Flipp Dinero, rapper
- Dominic Fike, rapper
- Sheff G, rapper of Haitian and Trinidadian descent
- Louis Moreau Gottschalk, composer and pianist
- Bigga Haitian, reggae musician
- Hoax, alternative rock band including Frantz N. Cesar of Haitian and Puerto Rican descent
- Lee Holdridge, multi-award-winning Haitian-born composer and orchestrator
- Wyclef Jean, Grammy Award-winning Haitian rapper, musician and actor
- J-Live, rapper, DJ and producer
- Jacki-O, rapper
- J. Rosamond Johnson, composer and singer during the Harlem Renaissance
- David Jude Jolicoeur, also known as "Trugoy the Dove"; rapper from De La Soul
- Kangol Kid, rapper, UTFO
- Rich The Kid, rapper
- DJ Whoo Kid, DJ, producer
- Steph Lecor, singer
- Mach-Hommy, rapper
- Maxwell, Grammy Award-winning singer
- Leyla McCalla, cellist with the string band Carolina Chocolate Drops
- Travie McCoy, lead singer of the band Gym Class Heroes
- Woodson Michel, singer-songwriter, record producer and actor
- Teri Moïse, singer
- Michel Mauléart Monton, composer; notable for composing the classic song choucoune (known as "yellow bird" in the English version)
- Richard Auguste Morse, founder of a mizik rasin band, RAM, named after his initials
- Jimmy O, rapper
- Pras, Grammy Award-winning rapper and founded of The Fugees; actor
- Riva Nyri Précil, singer
- Qwote, singer
- Dawn Richard, singer
- Devyn Rose, singer
- Daniel Bernard Roumain, composer, musician
- Saigon, rapper
- Cécile McLorin Salvant, Grammy Award-winning jazz singer
- 21 Savage, rapper (paternal grandfather was of a Haitian descent)
- Melky Sedeck, contemporary R&B duo
- Smitty, rapper
- Sol, rapper
- Vince Staples, rapper
- Sergio Sylvestre, singer
- MC Tee, rapper and co-founder of Mantronix
- Jon Theodore, former drummer of The Mars Volta, current drummer for Queens of the Stone Age
- Torch, rapper
- Pastor Troy, rapper
- Black Violin, musical duo
- Sha Money XL, producer
- Tony Yayo, rapper
- Fridayy, musician
- Sarina, musician

=== Sports ===
==== Basketball ====
- Jeff Adrien, undrafted NBA free agent
- Zach Auguste, undrafted NBA free agent, former Notre Dame basketball player
- Kervin Bristol, professional basketball player currently playing for the KK Włocławek of the Polish Basketball League
- Nadine Domond, former professional basketball player
- Quincy Douby, former Sacramento Kings NBA guard and current Zhejiang Golden Bulls CBA player
- Mario Elie, former Houston Rockets NBA guard
- Marie Ferdinand-Harris, first Haitian American WNBA player drafted; former Phoenix Mercury guard
- Blake Griffin, member of the Los Angeles Clippers after being drafted 1st in the 2009 NBA draft
- Taylor Griffin, drafted by the Phoenix Suns
- Nerlens Noel, member of the Philadelphia Sixers after being drafted 6th in the 2013 NBA draft
- Eniel Polynice, member of the Atleticos de San German in the BSN of Puerto Rico
- Matisse Thybulle, 20th selection of the 2019 NBA draft.

==== Boxing ====
- Andre Berto, professional boxer, 2004 Haitian Olympian, two-time welterweight champion
- Fernando Guerrero, Haitian-Dominican-born boxer
- Erickson Lubin, professional boxer
- Melissa St. Vil, women's lightweight boxer
- Patrick Day, professional boxer
- Richardson Hitchins, professional boxer

==== Football ====
- Mackensie Alexander, cornerback
- Stanley Arnoux, linebacker
- Cliff Avril, defensive end
- D'Anthony Batiste, offensive tackle
- Mackenzy Bernadeau, guard
- Giovani Bernard, running back
- Yvenson Bernard, running back
- Jacques Cesaire, defensive end
- Gosder Cherilus, offensive tackle
- Jason Chery, wide receiver
- Lewis Cine, safety
- Stalin Colinet, defensive tackle
- Antonio Cromartie, cornerback
- Da'Mon Cromartie-Smith, safety
- Marcell Dareus, defensive tackle
- Louis Delmas, safety
- Pierre Desir, cornerback
- Marc Dile, guard/tackle
- Jayson DiManche, outside linebacker
- Leger Douzable, defensive end
- Vladimir Ducasse, offensive tackle
- Elvis Dumervil, defensive end
- Dominique Easley, defensive tackle
- Audric Estimé, running back
- Terrence Fede, defensive end
- Deondre Francois, quarterback
- Junior Galette, defensive end
- Pierre Garçon, wide receiver
- Ron Girault, safety
- Josh Gordon, wide receiver
- Stanley Jean-Baptiste, cornerback
- Ricky Jean-Francois, defensive tackle
- Max Jean-Gilles, guard
- Lemuel Jeanpierre, guard and center
- Ashton Jeanty, Running Back
- Rashad Jeanty, linebacker
- Jerry Jeudy, wide receiver
- Carlos Joseph, offensive tackle
- Davin Joseph, offensive guard
- Frantz Joseph, linebacker
- Johnathan Joseph, cornerback
- Karl Joseph, safety
- William Joseph, defensive tackle
- Steve Josue, linebacker
- Emmanuel Lamur, linebacker
- Sammuel Lamur, linebacker
- Corey Lemonier, defensive linebacker
- Corey Liuget, defensive end
- Henry McDonald, running back
- Whitney Mercilus, linebacker
- Sony Michel, running back
- Vernand Morency, running back
- Steve Octavien, linebacker
- Olsen Pierre, defensive end
- Kevin Pierre-Louis, linebacker
- Jason Pierre-Paul, defensive end
- Dominique Rodgers-Cromartie, cornerback
- Mike Sainristil, cornerback
- Jonal Saint-Dic, defensive end
- Greg Senat, offensive tackle
- Pierre Thomas, running back
- Fitzgerald Toussaint, running back
- Jonathan Vilma, linebacker

==== Martial artists ====
- James Edson Berto, MMA fighter
- Olivier Murad, MMA fighter
- Ovince St. Preux, mixed martial artist; competes in the Light Heavyweight division for the UFC
- Adler Volmar, judoka
- Neil Magny, mixed martial artist; competes in the Welterweight division of the UFC

==== Soccer ====
- Jozy Altidore, soccer player for Toronto FC
- John Boulos, soccer player; is in the US National Soccer Hall of Fame
- Kimberly Boulos, soccer player
- Dave Cayemitte, soccer player (retired), now businessman
- Steward Ceus, soccer player
- Ronil Dufrene, retired soccer player
- Derrick Etienne, soccer player
- Pat Fidelia, retired soccer player
- Joe Gaetjens, member of the 1950 World Cup US National Team
- Zachary Herivaux, soccer player
- Andrew Jean-Baptiste, soccer player
- Stefan Jerome, soccer player
- Jacques LaDouceur, retired soccer player
- Jerrod Laventure, soccer player, forward (striker) for Red Bull New York)
- Benji Michel, soccer player
- Fafà Picault, soccer player
- Brian Sylvestre, soccer player
- Sébastien Thurière, soccer player

==== Sprinters and runners ====
- Dudley Dorival, Olympic hurdler
- Wadeline Jonathas, Olympic sprinter
- Nadine Faustin-Parker, Olympic hurdler who competed for Haiti in the Olympics in Sydney (2000), Athens (2004), and Beijing (2008)
- Moise Joseph, middle-distance runner; competed in the 2004 Olympic Games in Athens
- Barbara Pierre, track and field sprint athlete in the Pan American Games
- Marlena Wesh, sprinter competing in the 2012 Summer Olympics for Haiti
- Angie Annelus, sprinter finalist at the 2019 World Athletics Championships

==== Tennis ====
- Ronald Agénor, professional tennis player
- Victoria Duval, professional tennis player
- Jennifer Elie, professional tennis player
- Naomi Osaka, professional tennis player

==== Other sports ====
- Francis Bouillon, professional hockey player
- Dayana Cadeau, Haitian-born Canadian American professional bodybuilder
- Shad Gaspard, WWE professional wrestler
- Joshua Colas, professional chess player
- Haiti Kid, retired WWF professional wrestler; had dwarfism
- Samyr Lainé, Olympic triple jumper; competed for Haiti at the 2012 Summer Olympics
- Rodney St. Cloud, professional bodybuilder
- Touki Toussaint, professional baseball pitcher for the Atlanta Braves

== Fashion designers ==
- Azède Jean-Pierre
- Kerby Jean-Raymond, founder of the menswear label, Pyre Moss
- Fabrice Simon, award-winning artist and fashion designer, best known for his handmade beaded dresses

== Historical personalities ==
- Jeremiah Hamilton, Wall Street broker noted as "the only black millionaire in New York" about a decade before the American Civil War
- Viter Juste, coined the name "Little Haiti" for the neighborhood in Miami which is a center of the Haitian American community in Florida; considered the father of the community in Miami
- Jean Baptiste Point du Sable, founder of the city of Chicago
- Fred Staten, Haitian-born nightclub performer and infamous Voodoo King of New Orleans, known as Chicken Man
- Charles Terres Weymann, racing pilot; flew for Nieuport during World War I as a test pilot; was awarded the rank of Chevalier of the Legion of Honour

== Lawyers ==
- Combat Jack, hip hop music attorney and executive
- Edwin Warren Moïse, lawyer, physician and Confederate States of America
- Karl Racine, first elected Attorney General of the District of Columbia
- Mildred Trouillot, lawyer who married Jean-Bertrand Aristide

== Literature ==
- Yamiche Alcindor, journalist
- Lylah M. Alphonse, news editor
- Elsie Augustave, author
- Dean Baquet, Pulitzer Prize-winning American journalist and the executive editor of The New York Times
- Steve Canal, author
- Jacqueline Charles, journalist
- Anne-Christine d'Adesky, journalist and activist
- Edwidge Danticat, author
- Donna Denizé, poet and award-winning teacher
- Joel Dreyfuss, journalist, editor, and writer
- Roxane Gay, writer
- Fabrice Guerrier, writer
- Nathalie Handal, award-winning poet, writer, and playwright
- Sacha Jenkins, journalist
- James Weldon Johnson, author, and civil rights activist
- Peniel E. Joseph, historian
- Josaphat-Robert Large, writer
- Dimitry Elias Léger, novelist and essayist
- Roland Martin, journalist and syndicated columnist
- Marilene Phipps, poet, painter, and short story writer
- Alvin Francis Poussaint, author
- Victor Séjour, writer
- Luisah Teish, author
- Gina Athena Ulysse, poet
- Maurice Leonce, poet

== Science ==
- Gerard A. Alphonse, electrical engineer, physicist and research scientist; 2005 president of the United States division of the Institute of Electrical and Electronics Engineers (IEEE)
- Louis Gustave De Russy, engineer and U.S. army officer
- John James Audubon, naturalist
- Jean Charles Faget, physician
- Henri Ford, pediatric surgeon
- Linda Marc, public health researcher
- David Malebranche, physician working in the field of HIV/AIDS
- Hermanie Pierre, civil and environmental engineer

== Political figures ==
- Mack Bernard, member of the Florida House of Representatives
- Rodneyse Bichotte, first Haitian American elected in New York City, representing 42nd District of the New York State Assembly
- André Birotte Jr., United States district judge for the United States District Court for the Central District of California
- Ronald Brise, Florida House of Representatives
- Eugene Bullard, first black American military pilot
- Daphne Campbell, Democratic member of the Florida House of Representatives
- Josaphat Celestin, former Mayor of North Miami, Florida, and first Haitian American elected mayor of a sizable U.S. city
- Woody R. Clermont, First Haitian-American male, to be elected Judge to the Broward County Court
- Auguste Davezac, diplomat who served twice as United States Ambassador to the Netherlands
- Rodolphe Desdunes, civil rights activist and militiaman involved in the Battle of Liberty Place
- René Edward De Russy, Brevet Brigadier General in the United States Army
- Jules DeMun, aristocrat
- Philippe Derose, North Miami Beach councilman, Mayor of El Portal, Florida
- Mathieu Eugene, New York City councilman
- Phara Souffrant Forrest, New York Assemblywoman-elect and member of the Democratic Socialists of America
- Linda Dorcena Forry, Massachusetts State Senator
- M. Rony Francois, public health director of Georgia
- Patrick Gaspard, Director of the White House Office of Political Affairs (2009–2012), United States Ambassador to South Africa (2013–2016)
- Richard Howell Gleaves, 55th Lieutenant Governor of South Carolina
- Al Jacquet, member of the Florida House of Representatives
- Lody Jean, First Haitian-American woman to be appointed to and serve on Florida's 11th Circuit Court
- Karine Jean-Pierre, 35th White House Press Secretary
- Kimberly Jean-Pierre, Member of the New York Assembly from the 11th District
- Jean Jeudy, New Hampshire State Representative
- Dotie Joseph, Florida House of Representatives
- Rita Joseph, New York City Council
- Ruthzee Louijeune, Member of the Boston City Council at-large
- Jacques Jiha, New York City Commissioner of Finance
- John Joël Joseph, member of the Senate of Haiti
- Rita Joseph, member of the New York City Council
- Smith Joseph, mayor of North Miami
- Harry LaRosiliere, 38th mayor of Plano, Texas
- Raymond Lohier, became the first Haitian American to be confirmed (unanimously) by the United States Senate as a Judge for the U.S. Court of Appeals, Second Circuit in New York
- Mia Love, first Haitian-American and first black Republican woman in Congress; U.S. House of Representative for Utah's 4th district and former mayor of Saratoga Springs, Utah
- Farah Louis, member of the New York City Council
- Sheila Cherfilus-McCormick, first Haitian-American Democratic woman in Congress; U.S. House of Representative for Florida's 20th district
- Rudy Moise, retired Colonel of the United States Air Force, and politician
- Jean Monestime, first Haitian American to serve on the Miami-Dade County Commission
- Mercedes Narcisse, New York City Council
- Andre Pierre, former Democratic mayor of North Miami, Florida
- Pierre-Richard Prosper, ambassador, lawyer, prosecutor and government official
- Karl Racine, first elected Attorney General of the District of Columbia
- Joseph Rainey, Republican member of the South Carolina House of Representatives
- Alonzo J. Ransier, 54th Lieutenant Governor of South Carolina
- Kwame Raoul, 42nd Attorney General of Illinois
- Yolly Roberson, Florida State Representative
- Marie St. Fleur, former Massachusetts State Representative
- Michaelle C. Solages, represents the 22nd district in the New York State Assembly
- Brandon Tatum, former police officer, former/undrafted football player and conservative commentator
- Marie Woodson, Florida House of Representatives

== Religion ==
- John J. Chanche, first Roman Catholic Bishop of Natchez, 1841–1852
- Mother Mary Lange, foundress of the Oblate Sisters of Providence, Servant of God
- Mama Lola, Vodou priestess
- Pierre Toussaint, beatified candidate for sainthood in the Roman Catholic Church

== Others ==
- Stanley Barbot, radio personality based in New York City
- Jean-Robert Bellande, professional poker player, reality TV contestant, nightclub owner and promoter
- Patrick Dorismond, police abuse victim; brother of reggae artist Bigga Haitian
- Jeff Gardere, talk show host, psychiatrist and author
- Alix Idrache – Haitian–American US Army helicopter pilot
- Karine Jean-Pierre, senior advisor and national spokesperson for MoveOn.org
- Jean Paul Laurent, humanitarian
- Rodney Leon, architect
- Abner Louima, police brutality survivor
- Frantzdy Pierrot, soccer player for Maccabi Haifa

== See also ==
- List of Haitians
- List of Haitian Canadians
- List of Louisiana Creoles
- Haitian diaspora
