= Monestime =

Monestime is a surname. It may refer to:

- Carmelau Monestime (1931–2016), Haitian-born American community leader, activist and broadcaster
- Firmin Monestime (1909–1977), Haitian-Canadian politician and medical doctor
- Jean Monestime, Haitian-born American politician, real estate businessman
