= Mama Cax =

American–Haitian model and disabled rights activist (1989–2019)

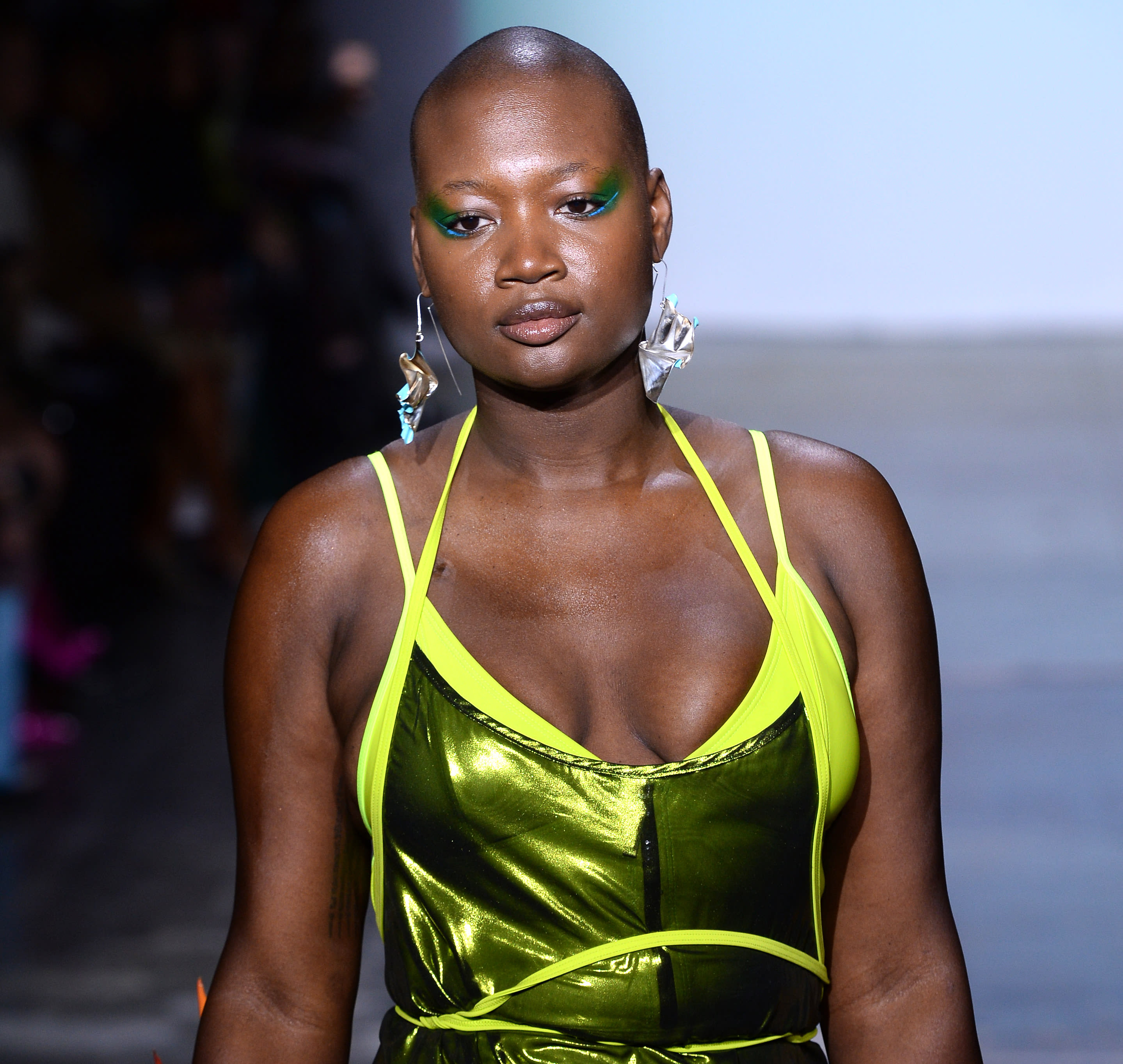
- Born: Cacsmy Brutus; November 20, 1989; New York City, U.S.
- Died: December 16, 2019 (aged 30); London, England
- Occupations: Model, activist

Cacsmy Brutus (November 20, 1989 – December 16, 2019), known as Mama Cax, was a Haitian American model and disability rights activist. With her prosthetic right leg, Cax was an unconventional figure in modern fashion modelling.

== Early life ==
Cacsmy Brutus was born in Brooklyn, New York City, on November 20, 1989. She grew up in Haiti, and at age 14, she was diagnosed with osteosarcoma and lung cancer—doctors gave her three weeks to live. Two years later, she received a hip replacement which failed, leading to the amputation of her right leg. She later said that it took several years to regain her confidence and that she hid her prosthetic leg for several years.

She earned bachelor's and master's degrees in international relations.

At age 18, Cax learned to play wheelchair basketball.

== Modeling ==
On September 15, 2016, Cax was invited to the White House to participate in a fashion show put on by Barack and Michelle Obama. At that time, she was working in the office of the Mayor of New York City with Dhiren Raja while finishing her studies.

In 2017, Cax appeared in her first commercial advertisement, and soon signed with the modelling agency JAG Models in New York. Among her appearances, she walked the runway in shows for Chromat and Rihanna's Fenty Beauty. Her later commercial work included ad campaigns for Tommy Hilfiger and Sephora.

She walked at New York Fashion Week in 2018, parading in a swimsuit designed by Becca McCharen (CEO and Creative Director for Chromat), who seeks to change the "standards of beauty". That year, she made the cover of Teen Vogue with Jillian Mercado and Chelsea Werner.

In 2019, Cax became the face of the Olay brand for their sunscreen marketing campaign. In October 2019, Cax announced she would be participating in the New York Marathon in a wheelchair.

== Death ==
While in England in December 2019, Cax was hospitalized at the Royal London Hospital for severe abdominal pains and blood clots in the lung, which were later confirmed as a pulmonary embolism; she died in the hospital on December 16, 2019.

== Legacy ==
On February 8, 2023, Cax was honored with a Google Doodle as part of Black History Month.

== See also ==
- List of Haitian Americans
- List of disability rights activists
- List of Teen Vogue cover models
