= American people of North American descent =

American people of North American descent refers to inhabitants of the United States with lineage tracing to other North American countries.

American people of North American descent include:

- Canadian Americans
- Mexican Americans
- Caribbean Americans
  - Stateside Puerto Ricans
  - Cuban Americans
  - Haitian Americans
