= Hoax (disambiguation) =

A hoax is deliberate false information.

Hoax may also refer to:

== Books ==
- "The Hoax", (Italian : Una burla riuscita), 1930 story by Italo Svevo
- Hoax (book) Hoax: Donald Trump, Fox News and the Dangerous Distortion of Truth 2020 non-fiction book by Brian Stelter.
- The Hoax, Clifford Irving 1981

== Film and television ==
- The Hoax, 2006 American drama film starring Richard Gere
- The Hoax (1972 film) comedy film
- Hoax (film), a 2019 American horror film
- "Hoax" (Drop the Dead Donkey), a television episode, 1991
- "Hoaxes", a Series H episode of the television series QI (2010)

== Music ==
- The Hoax, British band 1994–1999, featuring Robin Davey
- Hoax (band), American band
- The Hoax (band), Christian hardcore band
- "Hoax (song)", from Taylor Swift's Folklore
