= WRBY-LP =

- Salisbury, Maryland; United States
- Broadcast area: Metro Salisbury
- Frequency: 100.5 MHz
- Branding: Radio Oasis 100.5

Programming
- Language: Haitian Creole
- Format: Haitian Creole community

Ownership
- Owner: Rebirth, Inc.

History
- First air date: July 2015
- Call sign meaning: "Rebirth Salisbury"

Technical information
- Licensing authority: FCC
- Facility ID: 194108
- Class: L1
- ERP: 100 watts
- HAAT: 0.9 meters (3.0 ft)
- Transmitter coordinates: 38°22′4.60″N 75°36′19.80″W

Links
- Public license information: LMS
- Webcast: Listen live
- Website: rebirth4hope.org/wrby-100-5-radio-oasis

WRBY-LP is a Haitian Creole community formatted broadcast radio station licensed to and serving Salisbury, Maryland. WRBY-LP is owned and operated by Rebirth, Inc.

== See also ==
- Haitian Americans
- History of the Haitians in Salisbury, Maryland
