= Chicken Man =

Chicken Man may refer to:

- "Chicken Man" (theme tune), the original theme tune of the British TV series Grange Hill from 1978 to 1990 and also the theme tune of Give Us a Clue
- Chicken Man, the stage name of Fred Staten, nightclub performer, voodoo practitioner of New Orleans
- Chickenman (radio series), a radio series from the 1960s
- "Chickenman", a song by the Indigo Girls from the album Rites of Passage
- The Chicken Man, a recurring character in numerous Daniel Pinkwater books, such as Lizard Music
- Chicken Man, nickname of Philip Testa, boss of the Philadelphia mafia for a brief time
- "Chicken Man", a song by Evelyn Evelyn on their eponymous album
- "Chicken Man", a nickname of baseball player Wade Boggs
- "Chicken Man", nickname of the fictional character Gus Fring
- "Chicken Man", nickname of the fictional character Al McWhiggin
