= Irène Assiba d'Almeida =

Beninese poet, translator and literary scholar

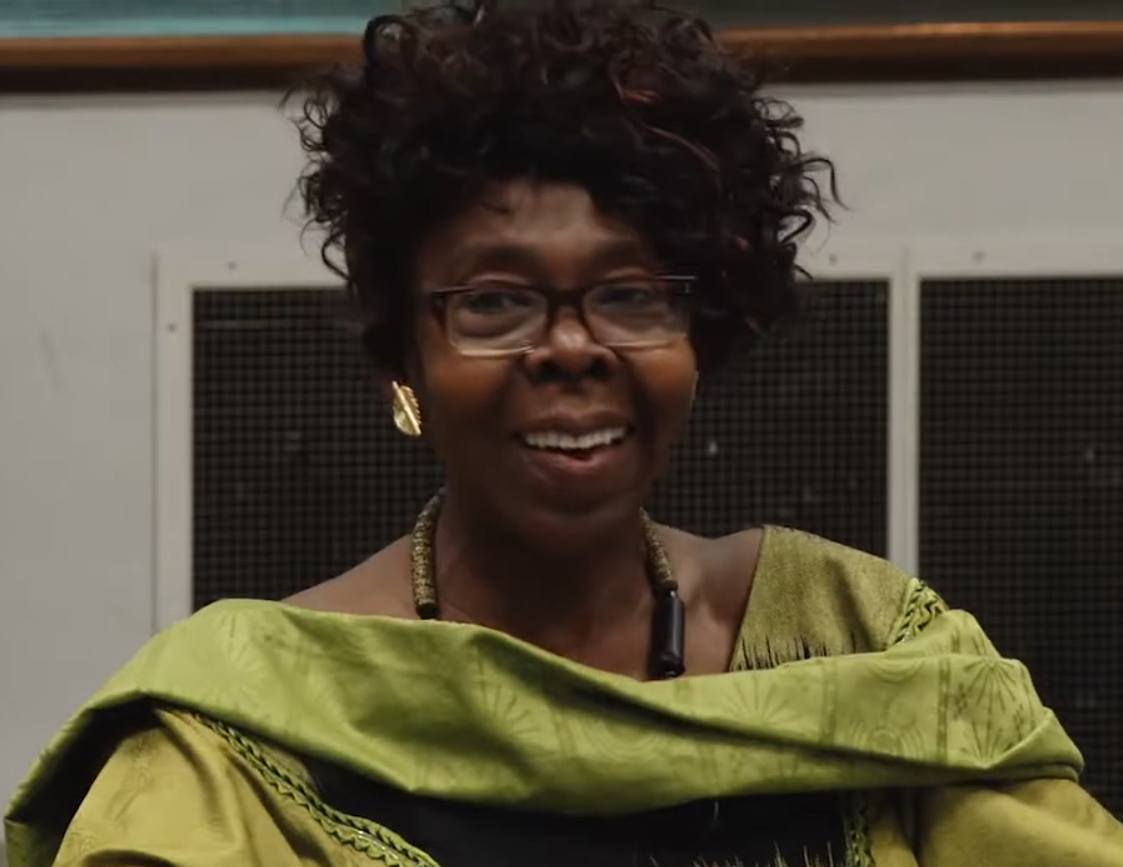
- Born: Dakar, Senegal
- Education: University of Amiens University of Ibadan Emory University
- Occupation: Professor
- Employer: University of Arizona.

Irène Assiba d'Almeida is a Beninese poet, translator and literary scholar. She is Professor of Francophone Studies and French at the University of Arizona.

== Life ==
Irène Assiba d'Almeida was born in Dakar, Senegal, to Dahomeyan parents. She was educated in Benin before gaining a BA degree from the University of Amiens in France, and an M.Phil from the University of Ibadan in Nigeria. She received her PhD in 1987 from Emory University in the United States. She collaborated with Olga Mahougbe to translate Chinua Achebe's novel Arrow of God into French.

D'Almeida's first book, Francophone African women writers, was welcomed as "quite an event for African, Women's and Francophone Studies". She was the convener of the 2010 African Literature Association Conference, which was held at the University of Arizona. The contributions were published as Eco-imagination: African and diasporan literatures and sustainability (2013).

== Works ==
- Francophone African Women Writers: destroying the emptiness of silence. Gainesville: University Press of Florida, 1994.
- (ed.) A Rain of Words: a bilingual anthology of women's poetry in Francophone Africa. Charlottesville: University of Virginia Press, 2009. Translated by Janis A. Mayes.
- (ed. with John Conteh-Morgan) "The original explosion that created worlds": essays on Werewere Liking's art and writings. Amsterdam; New York: Rodopi, 2010.
- (ed. with Lucie Viakinnou-Brinson and Thelma Pinto) Eco-imagination: African and diasporan literatures and sustainability. Trenton, New Jersey: Africa World Press, 2013.
- (ed. with Sonia Lee) Essais et documentaires des Africaines francophones: un autre regard sur l'Afrique. Paris: L'Harmattan, 2015.
- (with Elsie Augustave) Autour de "L'enfant noir" de Camara Laye: un monde à découvrir. Paris: l'Harmattan, 2018.
- ( with Raymond Gnanwo Hounfodji) Olympe Bhêly-Quenum, écrivain rebelle et visionnaire. Paris: l'Harmattan, 2024.
