= Emmanuel Fritz Paret =

Haitian entrepreneur (born 1989)

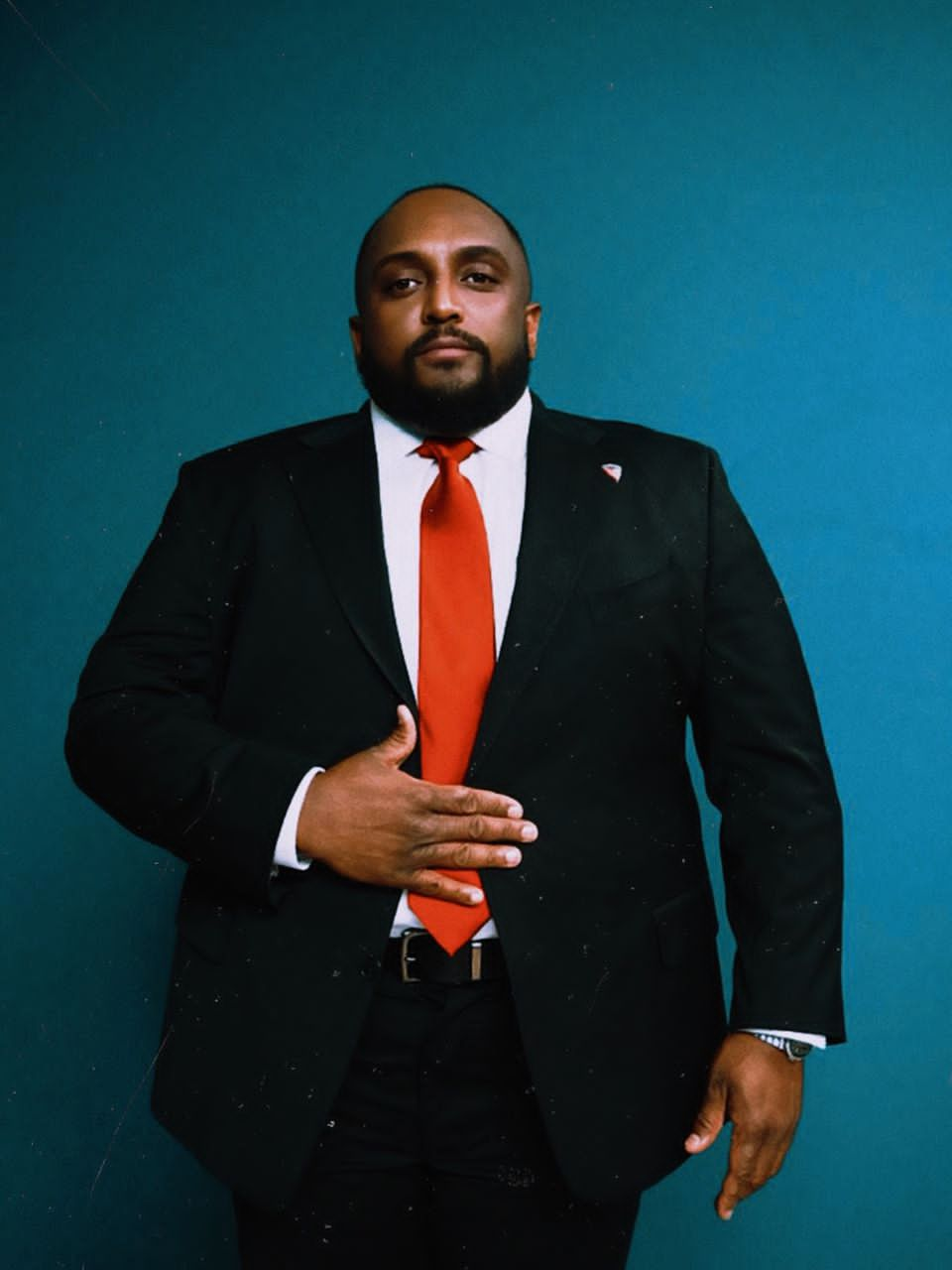
- Born: Emmanuel Fritz Paret; May 11, 1989 (age 37); Miami, United States
- Education: Miami Dade College
- Occupations: Entrepreneur; businessperson
- Employer: Paret Mining LLC
- Title: Founder of Paret Mining
- Partner: Kimberlay Paret
- Children: 3
- Website: www.emmanuelparet.com

Emmanuel Fritz Paret (born May 11, 1989) is a Haitian-American entrepreneur. He is best known for founding the natural resources mining company "Paret Mining".

== Early life and education ==
Emmanuel Fritz Paret was born on May 11, 1989, in Miami, United States. He is the son of Betty and Fritz Paret. He is the grandson of Fritz Antoine Paret Senior, former vice president of Chase Manhattan Bank under David Rockefeller. Through his ancestry, Paret is also connected to one of the most prestigious families in the French wine world. His great-grandmother, Marie Prudence Clicquot, his grandfather's mother, was the granddaughter of the founder of the renowned Veuve Clicquot champagne house. Paret grew up in South Florida and studied business and entrepreneurship at Miami Dade College before moving into the natural resources sector.

== Career ==
=== Founder of Paret Mining ===
Paret is the founder and CEO of Paret Mining LLC, a natural resource development company specializing in energy and mineral extraction. Under his leadership, the company has developed a diversified portfolio of energy and mining assets in the United States and Haiti.

=== Oil and Gas Development ===
Paret Mining operates oil and gas projects in Kentucky, where it controls significant hydrocarbon reserves and energy infrastructure. In addition to upstream production, the company has developed a pipeline network to transport gas from its fields to regional markets. Paret has also initiated a project to build a new modular refinery in the United States, which will process crude oil from its fields and other regional sources.

=== Mining Operations ===
In Haiti, Paret Mining operates a major calcium carbonate mining project, producing approximately 5,000 tonnes per day of high-purity calcium carbonate used in construction materials, pharmaceuticals, plastics, and various industrial applications. The company's Haitian mineral resources represent one of the largest high-grade calcium carbonate deposits in the region. The mining operation includes extraction, processing, and export facilities designed to supply international markets.

=== Agricultural and Distillation Ventures ===
The company owns three distilleries in Haiti, producing traditional Haitian spirits made from sugarcane. These distilleries produce Haitian kleren, a traditional sugarcane brandy made in the country for generations. To support these operations, Paret also cultivates sugarcane fields in Milot, Haiti, providing the raw material needed for distillation. Building on this experience, Paret also founded King Henri Christophe Spirits, a premium spirits brand inspired by the legacy of Henri Christophe, a historical figure in Haiti and founder of the Citadelle Laferrière. The brand's flagship product is King Henri Christophe Paret's Blended Whisky, a blended whisky combining aged American whiskey and Haitian sugarcane spirit. The brand was created to offer a unique Haitian-inspired whisky to international markets while celebrating the country's historical heritage.

=== Hospitality Investment ===
In 2016, Paret acquired Kaliko Beach Club, a historic beachfront property in Haiti. Following the acquisition, he renovated and redeveloped the resort, transforming it into Haiti's first DoubleTree by Hilton hotel and introducing an international hotel brand to the country's tourism sector.
