= Hermanie Pierre =

Haitian-American civil engineer and public figure

- Born: December 25, 1985 (age 40); Port-au-Prince, Haiti
- Education: Civil Engineering
- Alma mater: Tennessee State University
- Occupation: Civil Engineer
- Employer: Arkansas State Highway and Transportation Department
- Known for: Miss Haiti International 2012

Hermanie Pierre is a Haitian-American civil engineer and public figure. She is best known for her role as Miss Haiti International, a title she won in 2012 while also earning Miss Congeniality in the Miss International Pageant the same year. Pierre is a civil engineer where she works on road projects for the Arkansas State Highway and Transportation Department. She was also named one of 20 in their 20s Most Influential Leaders by Arkansas Business in 2013.

== Early life and education ==
Pierre was born in Port-au-Prince where she was raised until the age of 14 when she emigrated to the United States to be re-united with her parents. She had to learn English as well as adapt a new culture, graduating from Mount Juliet High School with high honors despite English not being her native language. She earned a scholarship to attend Tennessee State University where she graduated with honors, earning a degree in Civil Engineering.

== Career ==
After graduation, Pierre joined the Arkansas State Highway and Transportation Department as a civil engineer. She has been involved in major road projects for the state, including a multimillion-dollar project for Interstate 430 and Interstate 630.

Pierre has participated in numerous pageants both in the United States and internationally. She has held the title of Miss Haiti International 2012 as well as participated in Miss Saline County USA and Miss Northeast Arkansas. She also represented Haiti in the 2012 Miss International pageant, finishing in the top 10 and winning the Miss Congeniality award.

Pierre is also a writer, authoring the book How I Bought A $250000 House While Still In College. The book details how she earned scholarship money for college and was able to put a down payment down on a $250K house. The book was published by Amazon Digital Services in 2014. As a philanthropist, Pierre created a scholarship fund to help students in Haiti pay for school.
