= Philippe Derose =

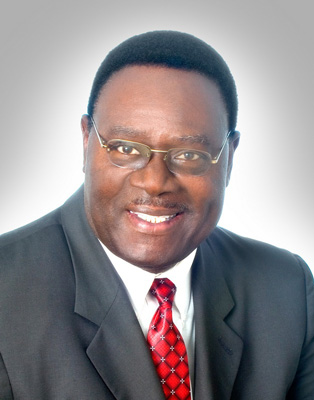
Philippe Derose

Philippe Derose (born November 22, 1952) is an American businessman and former politician who was reportedly the first Haitian American elected into public office in the United States. In 1993, he was elected councilman of the village of El Portal in Miami-Dade County, Florida. In 2000, Derose became the first Haitian American mayor when he was elected mayor of El Portal.

He later served as a councilman for North Miami Beach between 2003 - 2013 and serves as the president of his own non-profit organization, the Haitian-American Alliance Youth Foundation.

== Early life and education ==
Philippe Derose was born in the commune of Liancourt, Haiti on November 22, 1952. He grew up in the town of St. Marc. His father worked in construction, helping to build roads and also worked for the Haitian government in different capacities as a foreman. His mother was a businesswoman who sold cooked food (rice, beans, etc.) that she prepared in the countryside before traveling to big cities like the nation's capital, Port-au-Prince, to sell the food.

Derose is the third child of nine children, with other siblings living in Florida, Haiti, and New York. Desiring to come to America in search of a better life, he moved with his wife, Marie, from Haiti to Brooklyn, New York in 1974. He completed his high school equivalency in 1976 and in 1977-1979 Derose attended York College. He obtained his bachelor's degree in psychology at California Coast University.

== Personal life ==
Philippe Derose is married to Marie Derose, and he is the father of three children, all who hold careers in community and/or public service. Sendy Derose is a Registered Nurse in Miami, Florida, James Derose works for the United Nations in Haiti, and Frantzy Derose, a state certified paramedic, also heads his father's non-profit organization serving as the executive director for the Haitian-American Alliance Youth Foundation Inc.

Philippe Derose has five grandchildren.

== Political career in El Portal ==
North Miami Councilman Jacques Despinosse (left), Miami-Dade County Mayor Alex Penelas (center) and Derose (right) at a press event in 2001

In 1990, while he was living in the Village of El Portal, Derose noticed at the time that there was a small Haitian community in the area. When he began to attend Homeowner's Association (HOA) Meetings in his residential community, he developed his passion as an advocate for the community and after garnering support from his peers, he became a voice for the community.

In 1990, Philippe Derose ran his first political race, attempting to be elected for the city council of the Village of El Portal. He was unsuccessful. He ran for city council again in 1991 and was unsuccessful for a second time.

With two years of unsuccessful attempts of securing a position in the public office, Derose changed his strategy when he ran for city council for the third time in 1992. In the first two years he had campaigned, he concentrated solely on Haitian-American voters. When he re-developed his campaign strategy in 1992, he realized he needed to gain the support of the Anglo and Hispanic voters, so his new strategy included targeting all ethnic groups.

In 1993, after a strong campaign with this new strategy, he was the 1st place elected (obtaining the most votes) member of the Village of El Portal City Council becoming the first Haitian-American elected into public office in the United States.

After serving as Mayor of the Village of El Portal for one year, Derose voluntarily vacated his seat and was elected to the North Miami Beach City Council.

== Political career in North Miami Beach ==
As a Councilman for the City of North Miami Beach, one of Derose's major platforms was the beautification of the community, especially the planting and healthy maintenance of trees, shrubs, and greenery. A nature-lover, Derose commemorated Arbor Day by orchestrating community initiatives to plant trees and to distribute seedlings to residents.

Derose served on the North Miami Beach City Council as Councilman between 2003 and 2013.

== Earthquake in Haiti ==
A catastrophic earthquake (with a Richter score of 7) occurred in Haiti on January 12, 2010.

Less than two weeks after this devastating act of nature, Derose traveled on a private plane to his homeland of Haiti with a delegation of government officials, some of which included other notable Haitian-American officials. Upon arrival in Haiti, a sad Derose looked at the unrecognizable places that once appeared familiar and noted, "What man took many years to build, was gone, wiped out in a matter of seconds."

Once the delegation reached the ravaged island-nation, they met with the central government in Haiti, consisting of Haitian and local officials including Parliament.

Also included in this delegation was Patrick Gaspard, the Director of the Office of Political Affairs for President Barack Obama's Administration, and vice-president of the United States, Joe Biden. Along with these officials, Derose assisted in the expedition of the process to obtain aid for Haiti.
