= Stanley Barbot =

Stanley Barbot (1962, Port-au-Prince Haiti – September 17, 2009) was a Haitian-American radio personality in New York City.

He started his journalist career with WLIB (1190 AM) in late 1980s before joining the United States Army. He worked as an accountant and was the host of Moment Creole for more than twenty years. Barbot also worked on Radio Haiti International and Radio Tropicale. For over twenty years Barbot was an active promoter of Haitian Music, culture and was a leading voice for the New York Haitian Community.
