= Linda Marc =

American doctor

Dr. Linda Marc is a Haitian-American who is published in the areas of HIV/AIDS and minority health issues. In 2014 she was honored and placed on the '1804 List of Changemakers and One's to Watch' by the Haitian Round Table, an organization committed to civic engagement and philanthropic endeavors benefiting Haiti, Haitian organizations and causes. Her research has helped to dispel the myth about Haitians with AIDS, which challenged previous notions that Haitian immigrants have a higher prevalence of HIV/AIDS than all other ethnic groups.

Marc is the former Chair of the Public Health Committee for the Association of Haitian-American Engineers (2005–2007), and was honored in 2005 with an award from the Haitian-Canadian Association of Engineers and Scientists (AIHC) in Canada. In 2007 she was selected to serve on the Census Bureau's Race and Ethnicity Advisory Committee and was vice-chair of the Advisory Committee on the African American Population from 2007 to 2012. She was re-appointed by the Census Bureau (2012-2015) as the Convenor of the Race and Hispanic Research Working Group for the newly formed National Advisory Committee for Race, Ethnicity and Other Populations.

Marc earned a Doctor of Science from the Harvard T.H. Chan School of Public Health, a Master of Public Health from Yale School of Public Health, and a BA in Psychology from St. John's University (New York).
