= History of the Haitians in Salisbury, Maryland =

The city of Salisbury, Maryland is home to a small but rapidly expanding Haitian-American community. There are an estimated 2,000 Haitian-Americans living in the Salisbury metropolitan area. The community is growing quickly and Haitian businesses, restaurants, media, and religious and cultural organizations have been created to cater to the needs of the population.

== Demographics ==
The Haitian community of Salisbury originated because Haitian economic migrants were employed by local poultry processing plants such as Perdue Farms, Tyson Foods, and Mountaire Farms. Many members of the community came to Salisbury from Florida or New York.

In 1993, only a few dozen Haitian-Americans lived in Salisbury.

In 2010, the Haitian-American population of Salisbury was 963.

As of 2017, there were 1,967 Haitian-Americans in Salisbury.

== History ==
In 2016, local Haitian-American activists organized to gather funds for Haitian victims of Hurricane Matthew.

Haitians in Salisbury have been disproportionately affected by the COVID-19 pandemic in Maryland. Lack of access to resources, linguistic barriers, and other factors have exacerbated the rate of COVID-19 in the Haitian community. The Salisbury Coronavirus Recovery Task Force has been credited with having a substantial influence on the Haitian community's experience of COVID-19 by promoting inclusion, expanding community outreach, and providing more translators.

== Culture ==
Several media outlets have formed in Salisbury to cater to the Haitian population. The Wozo Marketing Group offers television programming and a radio station called Radio Wozo. Content is offered in both English and Haitian Creole. Wozo's programming is directed at Haitians who may not speak English or have an advanced education, and thus otherwise might not be knowledgeable about local news.

The WRBY-LP radio station offers religious broadcasting in Haitian Creole.

There are several Haitian restaurants in Salisbury, including the Caribbean Creole Cafe, Glory Caribbean Express, Grandma's Worldwide Caribbean Restaurant. Other restaurants in Salisbury serve Caribbean cuisine, such as the Jamaican restaurants Caribbean Flava and Reggae Soul Cafe.

There are several Haitian churches in Salisbury, including Word of Life Center and the First Haitian UMC of Salisbury. The Word of Life Center conducts services in Haitian Creole and has a congregation of more than 300 people.

An annual Haitian Flag Day Festival is held in downtown Salisbury to celebrate Haitian art, culture, music, and cuisine. The festival is organized by the Word of Life church and Rebirth, a Haitian-American community organization. County officials in Wicomico have declared the month of May to be Haitian Heritage Month.

== Notable people ==
- Fernando Guerrero, a Dominican-born boxer of Haitian descent.

== See also ==
- Haitian Americans
