= David Malebranche =

American physician

- Born: February 20, 1969 (age 57); Schenectady, New York
- Education: Princeton University, BA, 1990; Emory University School of Medicine, MD, 1996; Columbia University Mailman School of Public Health, MPH, 2001
- Scientific career
- Fields: Internal Medicine
- Workplaces: Emory University School of Medicine; University of Pennsylvania; Morehouse School of Medicine

David J. Malebranche (born February 20, 1969) is an American internal medicine physician, researcher, and public health advocate who specializes in HIV/AIDS prevention and treatment.

== Early life and education ==
Malebranche was born in Schenectady, New York to Roger and Donna Malebranche. He is a first-generation Haitian-American and his mother is European-American. His father, a surgeon, was born in Anse-à-Veau, Haiti and came to the United States in 1961.

Malebranche received a bachelor's degree in English from Princeton University in 1990 and a medical degree from Emory University School of Medicine in 1996. He completed residencies at New York-Presbyterian Hospital and at the New York City Department of Health and Mental Hygiene, during which time he earned a master's degree from Columbia University Mailman School of Public Health.

== Career ==
In 2001, Malebranche was appointed to the faculty of Emory University School of Medicine, where he served as an associate professor in the Department of Medicine until 2012. From 2012 to 2015, he was a primary care physician for the University of Pennsylvania Student Health Center in Philadelphia, Pennsylvania. He returned to Georgia in 2015 to work for WellStar Health System as the infirmary physician for the Cobb County Adult Detention Center in Marietta, Georgia. In 2017, he joined the faculty of Morehouse School of Medicine in Atlanta as an associate professor of medicine and medical director of student and employee health.

Malebranche has published articles in medical and public health journals on the topic of HIV in the Black community, an area of expertise which he has discussed in documentaries, news interviews, speeches, and educational programming. He contributed an essay to Family Affair: What It Means To Be African American Today, a 2009 anthology edited by Gil Robertson IV. In 2015, he published Standing on His Shoulders, a memoir about life lessons he learned from his father.
