= Jean Monestime =

American politician

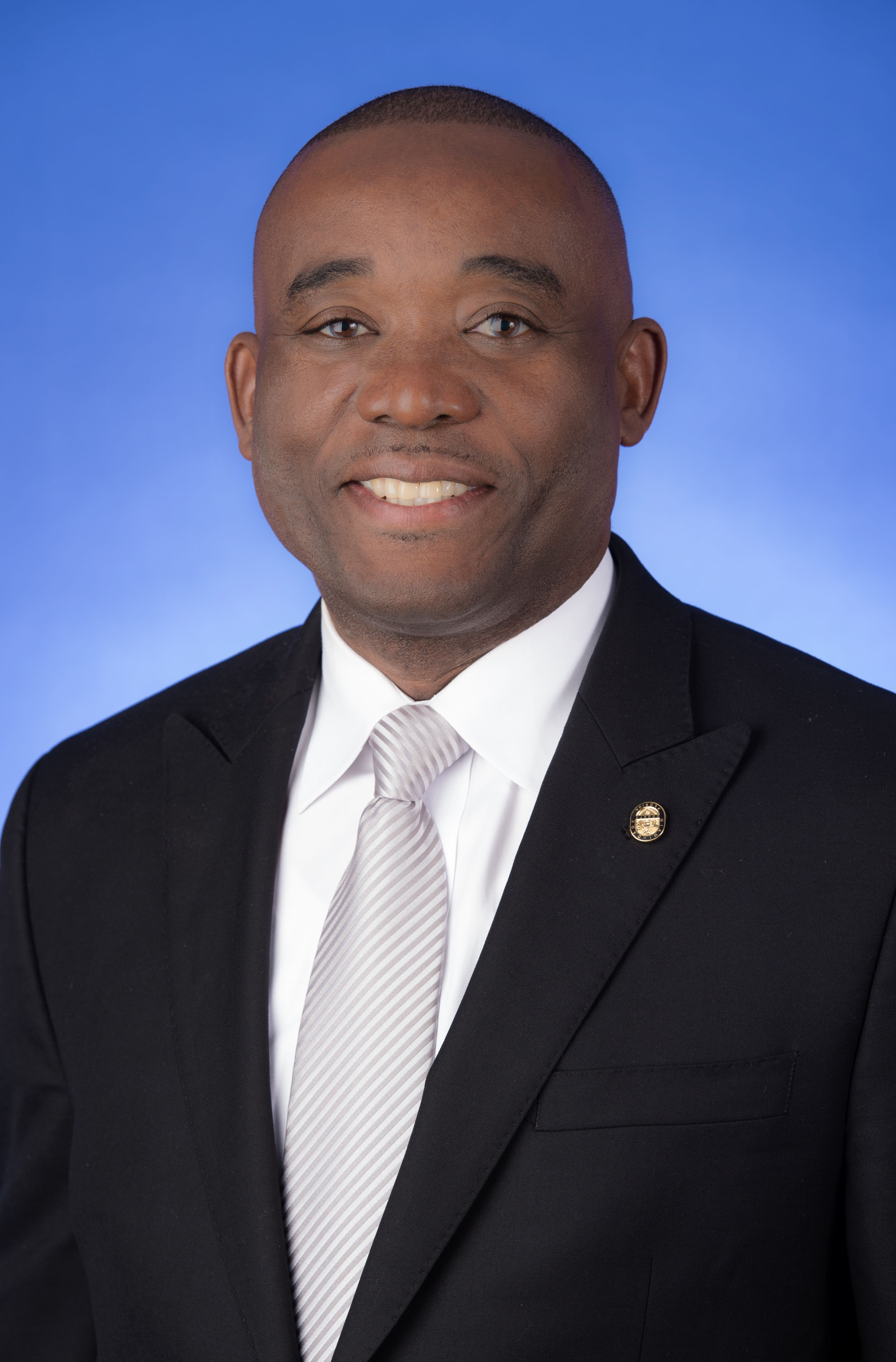

Member of the Miami-Dade County Commission from the 2nd district
- In office November 2010 – November 22, 2022
- Preceded by: Dorrin Rolle
- Succeeded by: Marleine Bastien

Personal details
- Born: 1962 or 1963 (age 62–63) Haiti
- Party: Democratic
- Spouse: Kettia Monestime
- Children: 2
- Education: Florida International University (BBA); Nova Southeastern University (MBA)

Jean Monestime (born 1962/1963) is an American politician, real estate businessman and member of the Miami-Dade County Commission since 2010. He is the first Haitian-American to serve as a Miami-Dade County commissioner, as well as the first to chair the commission. Monestime represents District 2 in northeast Miami-Dade County, which incorporates portions of North Miami, North Miami Beach and Biscayne Gardens, as well as the Miami neighborhoods of Little Haiti and Liberty City.

On November 24, 2014, Monestime's colleagues on the Miami-Dade County Commission unanimously elected him as the body's chairman for a two-year term. Monestime, who began his term as commission chairman on January 1, 2015, became the first Haitian American to chair to the County Commission. He succeeded outgoing Chairwoman Rebeca Sosa, who remained a member of the County Commission. The commissioners are officially nonpartisan, although Monestime is a member of the Democratic Party.

== Biography ==
=== Early life and education ===
Monestime emigrated from Haiti to the United States by himself when he was 17 years old. He didn't speak English until he arrived in Florida. In 1981, he was hired for his first job washing floors in a doughnut shop for $3.50 an hour.

Monestime received a bachelor's degree in finance from Florida International University and a Master's of Business Administration from Nova Southeastern University. A licensed real estate broker, he owns and operates his own real estate firm, Jemo Enterprises.

=== Political career ===
On November 2, 2010, Monestime defeated incumbent County Commissioner Dorrin Rolle in an upset in the runoff. Monestime won with 53 percent of the vote, while Rolle placed second with 47 percent. Rolle had faced several ethics investigations at the time. During the 2010 campaign, Monestime accused Rolle of emphasizing divisions and disputes between the African American and Haitian American communities.

Monestime, who campaigned on a promise to revitalize District 2's economy, secured $126 million in county funds to provide new sewage hook-ups throughout Miami-Dade County, including a commercial district near Northwest Seventh Avenue, which had previously utilized septic tanks. The Miami Herald called the funds the "biggest achievement" of Monestime's first term as a commissioner. He won re-election for a second term in 2014 in a rematch with Dorrin Rolle.

In January 2016, Monestime announced that he would not run for Mayor of Miami-Dade County in the forthcoming, county-wide mayoral election. He announced in October 2019 that he will run for Miami Dade County mayor in 2020. However, he withdrew from the race on April 30, later endorsing eventual winner Daniella Levine Cava Monestime left the Miami-Dade Board of County Commissioners in November 2022, due to term-limit. He has since been working as a Government Relations Advisor and Real Estate Consultant. Jean Monestime is not related to Carmelau Monestime, a pioneer of Haitian radio broadcasting in South Florida.
