= Jackson Georges =

Haitian-American painter

Jackson Georges (born in Port-au-Prince, Haiti) is a Haitian-American painter whose works have been on exhibit at the World Trade Art Gallery, the United Nations, and Mehu Gallery.

Born in Port-au-Prince, Haiti, Georges was the son of a prominent Haitian artist, Duclavier Georges (Leconte). Georges attended Foyer Des Arts Plastics. In the United States he attended City College where he majored in Architectural Design.

He uses all types of mediums such as wood, marble, metal, leather, stone, water color collage, acrylic and oil on canvas.
