= Viter Juste =

Viter Juste (December 15, 1924 – November 19, 2012) was a Haitian-born American community leader, businessman, and activist. Juste coined the name, "Little Haiti," for the neighborhood in Miami, Florida which is a center of the Haitian-American community in Florida. He is considered the father of the Haitian American community in Miami.

== Biography ==
=== Early life ===
Viter Juste was born on the island of La Gonâve, a Haitian island in the Gulf of Gonâve, on December 15, 1924. His father was a businessman. Viter Juste received a college degree in business and accounting. In 1946, Juste opened his first business, a supermarket located in the Haitian capital, Port-au-Prince. He later shuttered his supermarket in order to take a position with a disease eradication program operated by the United Nations.

=== Move to the United States ===
Juste's life in Haiti changed in the aftermath of the 1957 Haitian presidential election, which was won by François "Papa Doc" Duvalier. Duvalier would become a dictator, responsible for the deaths of thousands and the flight of many professionals from the country. Juste, who had openly supported Duvalier's main opponent, Louis Déjoie, in the election decided to leave Haiti for the United States for the safety of himself and his family. He initially moved to Texas, before living in New York City for several years. In 1973, Juste, his wife, Maria, and their children moved to Miami, Florida.

=== Advocacy ===
In 1972, one year before Juste moved to Miami, the first known, documented boat carrying Haitian refugees landed in South Florida. Two years later, Viter Juste held a 1974 meeting with Monsignor Bryan O. Walsh of the Roman Catholic Church in an effort to help the refugees. The 1974 collaboration between Walsh and Juste resulted in the creation of the Haitian-American Community Association of Dade, which was one of the first social service organizations founded specifically to cater to the needs of the Haitian community in Miami. Juste served as one of the Association's first directors. The meeting between Juste and Walsh effectively launched Juste's career as an advocate and activist on behalf of South Florida's Haitian immigrant and Haitian American community.

Juste led a community boycott against a local branch of the Winn-Dixie supermarket, which had openly discriminated against Haitians. He also protested against the Miami-Dade County Public Schools during the 1970s after the Miami-Dade School Board refused to allow undocumented Haitian students to enroll in the school district.

Juste's fight with the Miami-Dade School District led him to coin the term "Little Haiti" for the largely Haitian American neighborhood of Miami, historically known as Lemon City. According to Jean-Claude Exulien, a retired professor of history and friend of Juste's since 1977, Juste authored an article in the Miami Herald in which he first referred to the neighborhood as "Little Port-au-Prince." However, editors at the Miami Herald found the name, "Little Port-au-Prince," too long, so the newspaper shortened the term in the headline to "Little Haiti." The name stuck and has been widely used for the neighborhood.

Juste also worked to advance the Haitian American community in business and media. Juste was the first person in Miami to establish a French-language weekly newspaper targeted to Haitian Americans. His newspaper, which consisted of twelve pages, cost readers just 25 cents. Juste also opened Les Cousins Records and Books, which was the first store in Miami to sell Haitian Creole and Frans-language music and books. Juste moved Les Cousins Records and Books to Little Haiti.

Juste is also considered a pioneer in adult education in Miami. He was the first person to establish an adult education program held in the evenings, which allowed working people to attend his classes. Juste taught both English language classes and skills to assimilate into larger American society.

=== Later life ===
Juste, who suffered from diabetes and dementia during his later life, died at an assisted living facility in North Miami, Florida, on November 19, 2012, at the age of 87. He was survived by Juste by two daughters, Chantal Juste Watson and Maria Blain; three sons, Carl Juste, a photojournalist for the Miami Herald, Wagner, and Patrick Juste; fifteen grandchildren; and fifteen great-grandchildren. Juste was predeceased by his wife of sixty years, Maria, died in 2008, and two sons.

Archbishop Thomas Wenski of the Roman Catholic Archdiocese of Miami, who had known Viter Juste since in 1979, said of him following his death, "He was a man passionate for making his mark in the Haitian community; both as a businessman and a community leader...He was a pioneer, and paved the way for young generations of Haitians to follow." Former Haitian political prisoner and history professor, Jean-Claude Exulien, who first Juste in 1977, also paid tribute to Juste, telling the Miami Herald, "This is a huge loss for the community...We didn't always agree on Haiti, but on the plan for the community here, we were together."
