= Woodson Michel =

Haitian-American singer

- Born: February 2, 1981 (age 44); Port-au-Prince, Haiti
- Genres: R&B, PBR&B
- Occupation(s): Singer, songwriter, record producer
- Years active: 2008-present

Woodson Michel is a Haitian-American singer, songwriter, and record producer. In the last few years since 2010, he has released singles, music videos and albums.

== Musical career ==
Woodson interest in music was inspired by the likes of Prince, R. Kelly, Dru Hill and Michael Jackson. His career started with a group called Lowkey, consisting of Maurice Hampton and Ralph G. Lowkey, releasing two singles. Woodson worked with producer Marc Celestin Jr., who produced his album called, "Your Night." He has worked with Ken Schmidt for his videos "Whine", "Pop Pop", and "She’s Hot." Woodson's single "Let Me Be," was featured on the Digital Radio Tracking Chart sitting at #148 (out of 200) on the first week of August 2013.

== Discography ==
=== Album ===
- Your Night (2010)

=== Singles ===
- Her -2010
- She's hot ft.: Mighty Mystic -2010
- Whine ft.: Axis -2010
- Pop Pop ft: Bizzy boy
- Killing Me: -2012
- AEIOU: -2013
- Dancing & Sexing: -2014
