= Abner Genece =

American actor

- Born: Waltham, Massachusetts, U.S.
- Occupation: Actor

Abner Genece is an American actor.

== Biography ==
Genece was born in Waltham, Massachusetts, then raised in Cincinnati, Ohio and Miami, Florida. He studied acting at the American Academy of Dramatic Arts and made numerous appearances on television in such series as Malcolm & Eddie and The District.

In theatre, Genece received an NAACP Theatre Award for his portrayal of Haitian leader Jean-Jacques Dessalines in the first installment of "For the Love of Freedom", playwright Levy Lee Simon's trilogy about the Haitian revolt. He won a Maddy Award for his lead performance in "Othello".
