= Alix Idrache =

Haitian–American US Army helicopter pilot

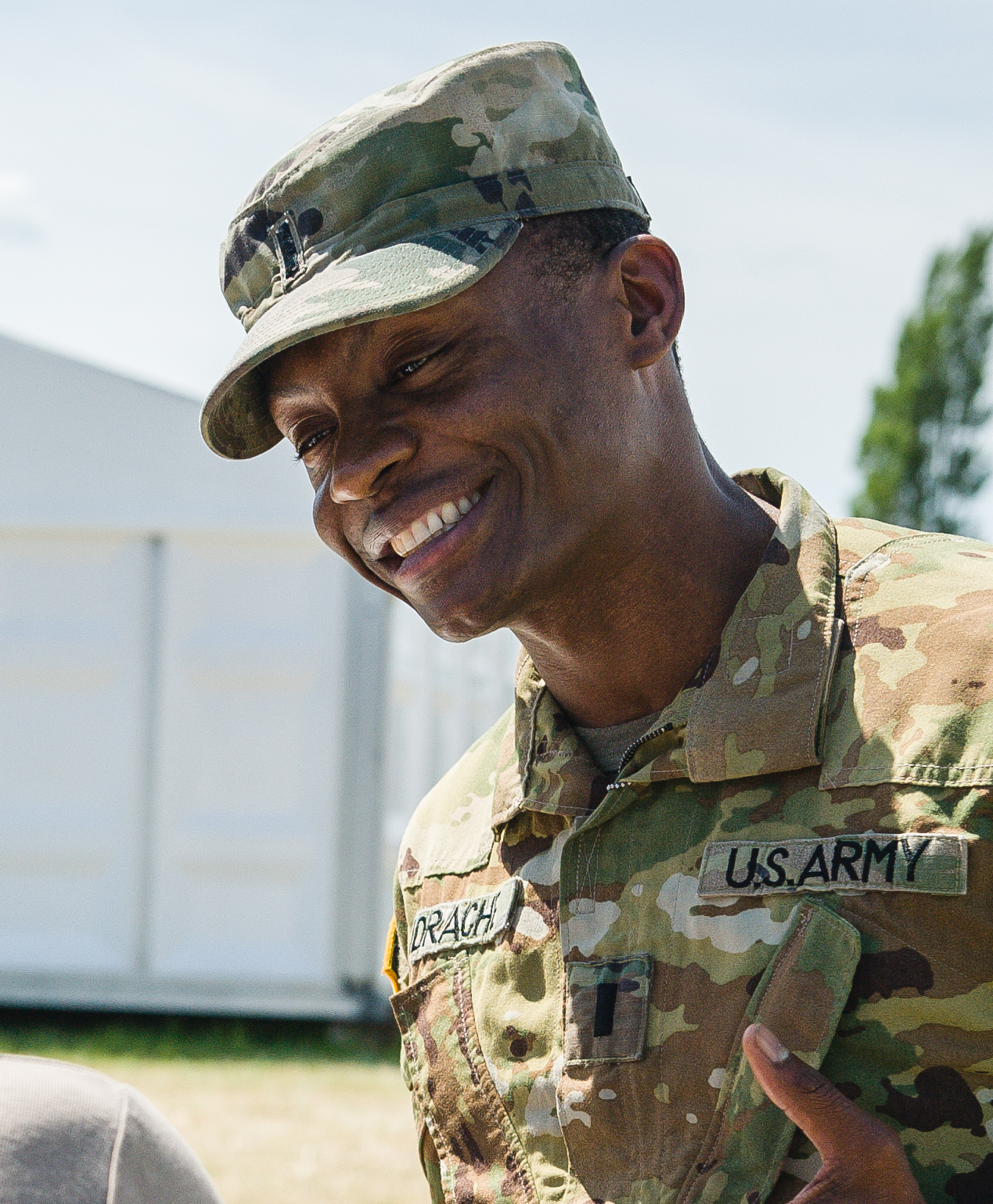
- 1LT Idrache in 2019
- Born: Haiti
- Citizenship: United States
- Education: US Military Academy (2016)
- Military career
- Branch: Maryland Army National Guard; United States Army
- Years: 2010–present
- Rank: Captain
- Unit: 228th Aviation Regiment

Alix Schoelcher Idrache is a Haiti-born military officer and helicopter pilot in the United States Army.

== Personal life ==
Idrache's father Dieujuste dropped out of school at 14 years old to find work in Port-au-Prince. Alix Schoelcher Idrache was born in Haiti, devoted himself to schoolwork at his father's encouragement, and also saw the United States Armed Forces engaging in humanitarian missions there.

After Dieujuste emigrated to the United States, he was able to bring his son in 2009, who later became a naturalized citizen. In May 2016, the US Army listed New Carrollton, Maryland as Idrache's hometown.

== US Military ==
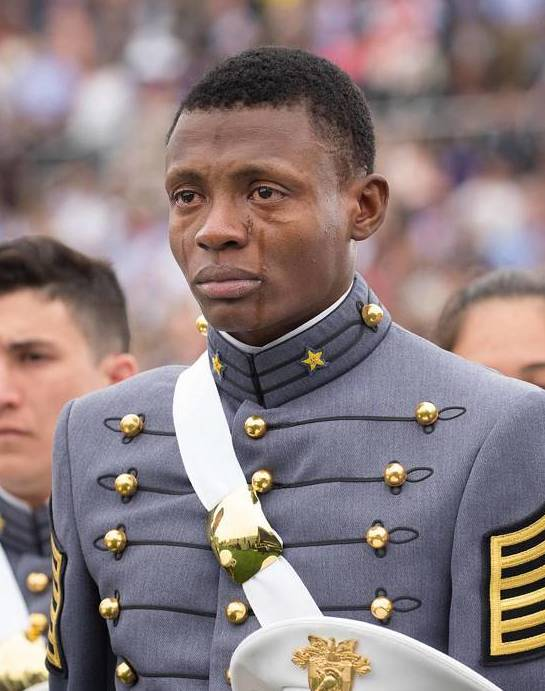
Idrache at his 2016 graduation

Idrache joined the Maryland Army National Guard in 2010—later joking that they convinced him "because of a free t-shirt!" After completing Basic and Advanced Individual Training, Idrache successfully applied to the USMA with the assistance of his platoon leader and "the unit's full-time office administrator". Arriving in 2012, on 21 May 2016 he graduated from the West Point, New York school (the Maryland Guard's first, at the top his class in physics); a photo of a tearful Idrache went viral.

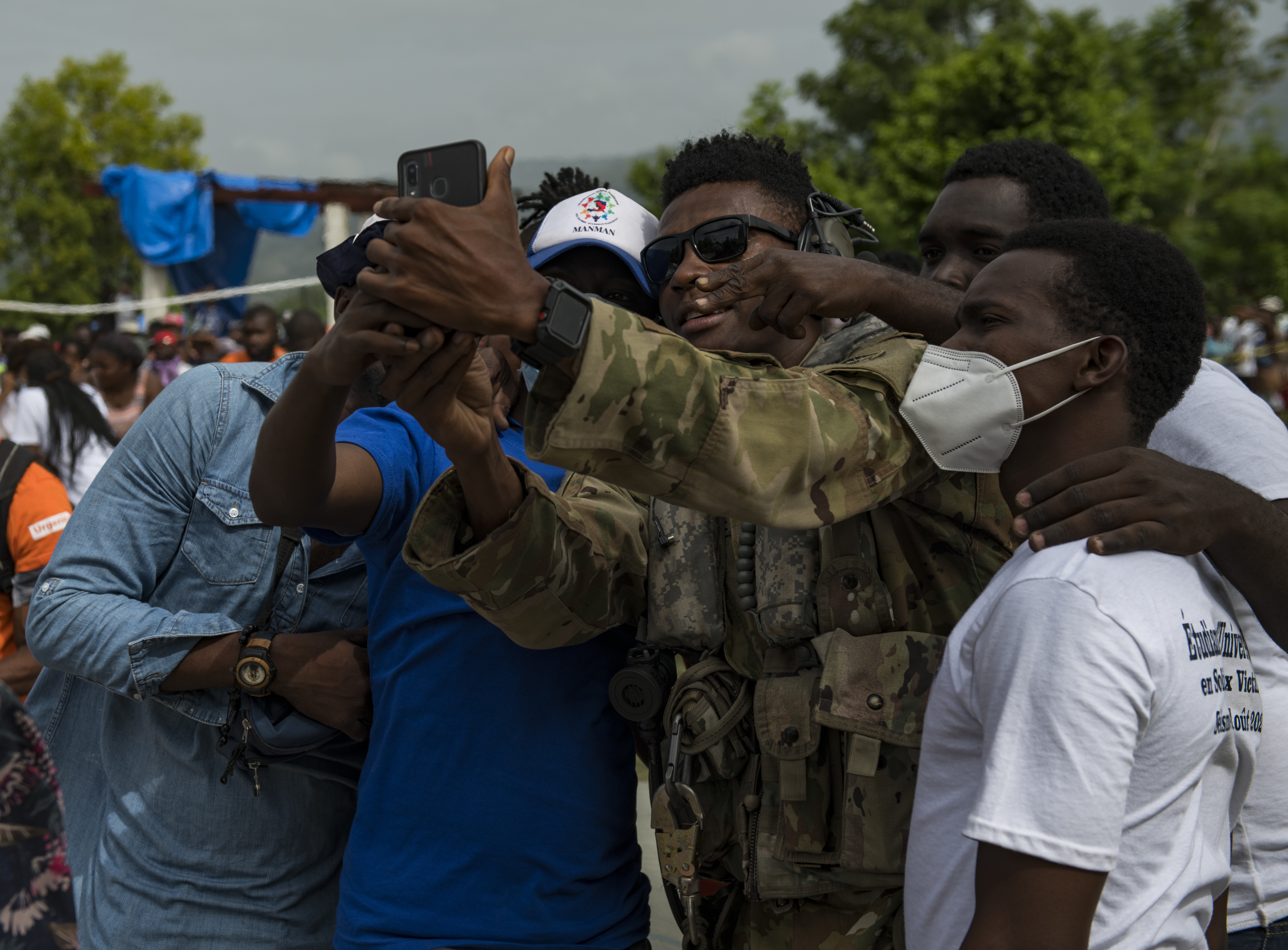
Captain Idrache posing with Haitian locals (25 August 2021)

By June 2019, Idrache's uniform bore the insignia of a first lieutenant and the Army's 1st Infantry Division. That month he was stationed in Carentan and liaising with French media on the occasion of the Normandy landings' 75th anniversary. A captain assigned to the 228th Aviation Regiment by September 2021, Idrache joined Joint Task Force Haiti's response to the 2021 Haiti earthquake; the UH-60 Black Hawk pilot supported evacuation efforts as well as translating both French and Haitian Creole.
