= Biscayne Gardens, Florida =

Biscayne Gardens
- Census-designated place
- Location in Miami-Dade County and the state of Florida

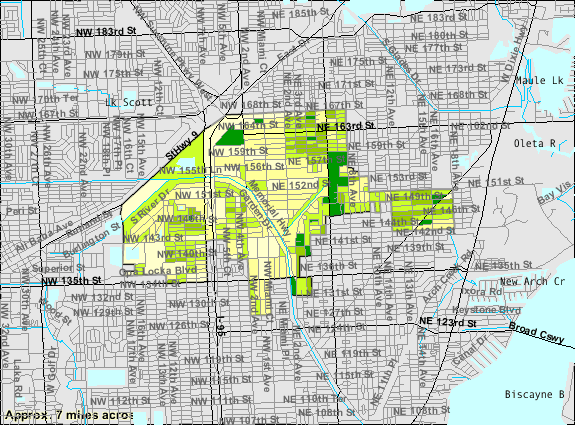
- U.S. Census Bureau map showing CDP boundaries
- Interactive map of Biscayne Gardens
- Coordinates: 25°54′46″N 80°12′05″W
- Country: United States
- State: Florida
- County: Miami-Dade

Area
  - Total: 5.02 sq mi (13.01 km^{2})
  - Land: 4.83 sq mi (12.51 km^{2})
  - Water: 0.19 sq mi (0.50 km^{2})
- Elevation: 7 ft (2.1 m)

Population (2020)
  - Total: 32,499
  - Density: 6,725.8/sq mi (2,596.8/km^{2})
- Time zone: UTC-5 (Eastern (EST))
  - Summer (DST): UTC-4 (EDT)
- ZIP Codes: 33054 (Opa Locka); 33161, 33167, 33168 (North Miami); 33162 (North Miami Beach); 33169 (Miami Gardens)
- Area codes: 305, 786, 645
- FIPS code: 12-26375
- GNIS feature ID: 2402532

Biscayne Gardens is a census-designated place (CDP) in Miami-Dade County, Florida, United States. It is part of the Miami metropolitan area of South Florida. The population was 32,499 at the 2020 US census.

It's also the location of the Golden Glades Interchange which connects the Florida Turnpike, Interstate 95, US 441, State Road 9, and the Palmetto Expressway.

== History ==
The community overwhelmingly rejected a petition to incorporate on November 2, 2021.

== Geography ==
Biscayne Gardens is located in northeastern Miami-Dade County, 11 miles (18 km) north of downtown Miami. The community is bordered by four cities: Miami Gardens to the northwest, North Miami Beach to the northeast, North Miami to the southeast and south, and Opa-locka to the west.

According to the United States Census Bureau, the CDP has a total area of 5.0 square miles (13 km^{2}). 4.8 square miles (12 km^{2}) of it are land and 0.2 square miles (0.5 km^{2}) (3.82%) are water.

The Golden Glades Interchange is on the northern side of the community. From it, Interstate 95 leads south 11 miles (18 km) to the center of Miami and north-northeast 15 miles (24 km) to Fort Lauderdale, Florida's Turnpike leads north parallel to and inland from I-95, and the Palmetto Expressway leads west and south 23 miles (37 km) to U.S. Route 1 in Pinecrest. From the same interchange, State Road 9, a surface road, leads southwest 3 miles (5 km) to the center of Opa-locka, and U.S. 441 leads south parallel to I-95 as far as downtown Miami.

== Demographics ==
Historical population
Census	Pop.	Note	%±
1980	23,154		—
1990	25,474		10.0%
2000	32,623		28.1%
2010	33,145		1.6%
2020	32,499		−1.9%
U.S. Decennial Census; 2010 2020

The name of the CDP was changed in 2023 from Golden Glades to Biscayne Gardens although the latest American Community Survey as of June 2023, still lists the CDP as Golden Glades.

Biscayne Gardens CDP, Florida – Racial and ethnic composition Note: the US Census treats Hispanic/Latino as an ethnic category. This table excludes Latinos from the racial categories and assigns them to a separate category. Hispanics/Latinos may be of any race.
Race / Ethnicity (NH = Non-Hispanic)	Pop 2000	Pop 2010	Pop 2020	% 2000	% 2010	% 2020
White alone (NH)	3,948	2,334	1,676	12.10%	7.04%	5.16%
Black or African American alone (NH)	20,669	23,358	22,201	63.36%	70.47%	68.31%
Native American or Alaska Native alone (NH)	60	46	37	0.18%	0.14%	0.11%
Asian alone (NH)	584	520	519	1.79%	1.57%	1.60%
Pacific Islander or Native Hawaiian alone (NH)	24	15	13	0.07%	0.05%	0.04%
Other race alone (NH)	62	82	175	0.19%	0.25%	0.54%
Mixed race or Multiracial (NH)	1,523	656	643	4.67%	1.98%	1.98%
Hispanic or Latino (any race)	5,753	6,134	7,235	17.63%	18.51%	22.26%
Total	32,623	33,145	32,499	100.00%	100.00%	100.00%

=== 2020 census ===
As of the 2020 United States census, there were 32,499 people, 10,072 households, and 6,892 families residing in the CDP. The most reported ancestries were:

- Haitian (39.8%)
- African American (14.6%)
- Cuban (5.6%)
- Jamaican (3%)
- Dominican (2.8%)
- Puerto Rican (2.7%)
- Honduran (1.8%)
- Nicaraguan (1.7%)
- Colombian (1.2%)
- English (1.1%)

As of the 2010 United States census, there were 33,145 people, 9,320 households, and 6,992 families residing in the CDP.

=== 2000 census ===
As of the census of 2000, there were 32,623 people, 9,826 households, and 7,281 families residing in the CDP. The population density was 2,560.1/km² (6,635.0/mi²). There were 10,540 housing units at an average density of 827.1/km² (2,143.7/mi²). The racial makeup of the CDP was 23.38% White (12.1% Non-Hispanic White), 65.29% African American, 0.28% Native American, 1.81% Asian, 0.07% Pacific Islander, 2.92% from other races, and 6.24% from two or more races. Hispanic or Latino of any race were 17.63% of the population.

As of 2000, there were 9,826 households out of which 44.5% had children under the age of 18 living with them, 41.8% were married couples living together, 24.5% had a female householder with no husband present, and 25.9% were non-families. 20.6% of all households were made up of individuals and 7.3% had someone living alone who was 65 years of age or older. The average household size was 3.23 and the average family size was 3.72.

In 2000, in the CDP, the population was spread out with 31.1% under the age of 18, 10.2% from 18 to 24, 30.1% from 25 to 44, 18.5% from 45 to 64, and 10.1% who were 65 years of age or older. The median age was 31 years. For every 100 females there were 89.2 males. For every 100 females age 18 and over, there were 83.8 males.

In 2000, the median income for a household in the CDP was $30,841, and the median income for a family was $33,577. Males had a median income of $25,036 versus $21,409 for females. The per capita income for the CDP was $12,341. About 18.5% of families and 20.9% of the population were below the poverty line, including 25.4% of those under age 18 and 24.0% of those age 65 or over.

As of 2000, speakers of English as a first language accounted for 44.27% of residents, while French Creole made up 31.35%, Spanish was at 18.63%, and French was at 3.82% of the population.

As of 2000, Biscayne Gardens had the highest percentage of Haitian residents in the US, with 33.50% of the populace (nearby North Miami had the second highest percentage in the US, with 33.0% of the populace.) It had the fourth highest percentage of Bahamian residents in the US, at 1.80% of the population, and the twentieth highest percentage of Jamaican residents in the US, at 5.70% (tied with Ives Estates, FL, East Orange, New Jersey and Gordon Heights, New York.) It also had the seventy-eighth most Cubans in the US, at 4.04% of the population, while it had the ninety-first highest percentage of Dominicans, at 1.72% of all residents (tied with North Miami and East Newark, New Jersey.)

== Education ==
Biscayne Gardens is within the Miami-Dade County Public Schools.

== Transportation ==
Biscayne Gardens is served by Tri-Rail at the Golden Glades station. It contains a park-and-ride facility, and also serves as a feeder for buses from the surrounding area, run by both Miami-Dade Transit and Broward County Transit.
