= Paul Gardère =

Haitian-American artist

Paul Claude Gardère (1944–2011) was a visual artist whose work explored race, identity, and post-colonial history, through a hybridization of Haitian and Western iconography and cultural traditions. He is known for his multi-media paintings that integrate a range of materials, including acrylic paint, photography, wood, glitter, and soil. Gardère was born in Haiti and moved to New York City at the age of 14. He eventually settled in Brooklyn, where he lived and worked for most of his life.

== Early life and education ==
Paul Gardère was born in Port-Au-Prince, Haiti in 1944 to an established Haitian family of the French-speaking mulatto class, the light-skinned Haitians of African and European descent. When François Duvalier came to power in 1957, mulattoes such as the Gardères were the target of his violent regime, which was defined by Noirism. In fall of 1959, Gardère emigrated to New York City. When Duvalier closed schools to all light-skinned students, Paul's mother had decided to move her sons to New York out of fear for their safety. It would be 19 years before Gardère would return to Haiti.

Gardère attended the Lycée Français de New York for high school. Commuting from Queens to the Upper East Side of Manhattan, he discovered art in the windows of the galleries along Madison Avenue and frequented The Metropolitan Museum of Art and other museums.

Gardère studied at the Art Students League of New York in the early 1960s, where he worked with Harlem Renaissance painter Charles Alston. He earned his Bachelor of Arts degree from Cooper Union School of Art and Architecture in 1967, where he studied with social-realist artist Robert Gwathmey, interdisciplinary artist Reuben Kadish, and printmaker Robert Blackburn. He earned a Master of Fine Arts degree from Hunter College in 1972, having studied with American artists Robert Morris and John McCraken.

In 1978, shortly after the death of his mother, Gardère returned to Haiti, which was still under the control of Duvalier. For six years, he lived with his family in the house built by his grandfather. He dedicated himself to the self-study of Haitian art and the development of a Haitian painting style, aiming to "adapt them to the vocabulary of modernism." Seeking to avoid the rising political tension in Haiti and the antagonism of the second Duvalier dictatorship, In 1984, Gardère returned to Brooklyn with his family, which by then included a second child. Gardère was naturalized as a United States citizen in 1991.

== Art and career ==
Gardère developed a personal style that blended "Haitian regionalist ideas, painting styles, and cultural symbols" with "the larger aesthetics of Modern art". His paintings have been described as a "unique intersection of his personal history, colonialism, and traditional religions." They incorporate a range of iconographies, symbols, and cultural references that draw from Vodou cosmology, Christianity, and art history. In his work, Gardère employed the concepts of bricolage and metissage (cultural mixing and hybridization) in material and pictorial process. This was a way for him to reference the process of racial, social, and cultural blending that happens in colonized societies and the resulting phenomenon of Creolization, or creation of altogether new cultures.

Gardère exhibited widely in his lifetime and was included in several solo and group exhibitions focused on Caribbean art and African-diasporic art. Gardère also participated in several significant residencies throughout his career. He was the first Haitian Artist-in-Residence at the Studio Museum in Harlem. During the residency he made several multi-media works with mud and rope, which he exhibited in 1991. The use of earth as a figurative sculpting medium connected to his homeland and political exile, while the rope was explained as "identified with bonding and even with religious revelation."

Gardère completed a 4-month residency at Monet's Gardens in Giverny, France on a grant from the Lila Acheson Wallace Foundation. The works created there combined painted scenes and photographs from the garden with allegorical references, symbols, and motifs drawn from Haitian culture and history. He explained that he was "trying to say that in this garden, the most sacred of European culture, Africa is here too." Reflecting on his time at Giverny, Gardère has said, "Gardening is an apt metaphor for global colonialism."

In 1999, he had a solo exhibition curated by Alejandro Anreus at the Jersey City Museum, which included 22 mixed media works created from 1995-1998 inspired by his residency at Monet's Gardens. The museum's printed catalog includes a historical essay by Anreus and an interview with the artist reproduced in English and Haitian Creole.

== Legacy ==
Gardère died in New York City on September 2, 2011. His estate is managed by his daughter Cat Gardère, who has worked to organize his archive and collection and create opportunities for exhibitions. In 2022, the estate participated in a residency with the non-profit organization Soft Network, which presented his work at the inaugural Independent 20^{th} Century Art Fair, helping to introduce his work to new audiences.

In 2024, Gardère was included in the exhibition "Surrealism and Us: Caribbean and African Diasporic Artists Since 1940," at the Modern Art Museum of Fort Worth. The show was significant for positioning Gardère as part of a legacy of Caribbean and African diasporic Surrealists who were inspired by the texts of Aimé Cesaire and Suzanne Cesaire. He work was shown alongside work by artists such as Ana Mendieta, Wifredo Lam, Hervé Télémaque, and Kerry James Marshall.

In fall of 2024, Cooper Union opened an exhibition of the alumni artist's career at The Hamilton Fish House, which was on view until June 2025. This was Gardère's first posthumous survey.

In 2025, Gardère had a solo exhibition at Magenta Plains gallery in New York entitled "Second Nature," which featured previously unexhibited works from his Giverny residency and included key works not seen since his exhibition at the Jersey City Museum in 1999. The gallery established the series connected to Giverny as one of Gardère's most important bodies of work, and the exhibition received critical attention. In 2026, Magenta Plains announced its representation of the estate.

== Selected exhibitions ==
- 1987 Paul Claude Gardère, Hallwalls Contemporary Art Center, Buffalo, NY
- 1995 Alternatives: 20 Years of Hallwalls, Burchfield-Penney Art Center, Buffalo State College, Buffalo, NY
- 1997 The Work of Haitian Artist Paul Claude Gardère, Le Centre d'Art, Port-au-Prince, Haiti
- 1998 Kongo Criollo, Taller Boricua Gallery, New York, NY
- 1999 Recent Works, 1995-1998, Jersey City Museum, Jersey City, NJ
- 2001 Marks of the Soul, Ritter Art Gallery, Florida Atlantic University, Boca Raton, FL
- 2007 The Visual Semantics of Diaspora: Paul Gardère, Lehigh University, Zoellner Main Gallery, Bethlehem, PA
- 2008 Multiple Narratives II, Skoto Gallery, New York, NY
- 2011 Haitian Art Excerpts: From Renaissance To Diaspora, Kresge Gallery, Berrie Center, Ramapo College of New Jersey, Mahwah, NJ
- 2012-2016 Restoring the Spirit: Celebrating Haitian Art, Figge Art Museum, Davenport, IA, Pomona College Museum of Art
- 2017 Goudou Goudou, Skoto Gallery, New York, NY
- 2020 Soft Network Presents: Paul Gardère, Independent 20th Century, New York, NY
- 2020 Young Artists: One, Fridman Gallery, New York, NY
- 2022 Paul Gardère & Didier William, Soft Network, New York, NY
- 2023 Anything can pass before the eyes of a person, Derosia Gallery, New York, NY
- 2024 Charismatic Goods, Canada Gallery, New York, NY
- 2024 Paul Gardère: Vantage Points, The Cooper Union Stuyvesant Fish House, New York, NY
- 2024 Repossession: Didier William and Paul Gardère, Zimmerli Art Museum, New Brunswick, NJ
- 2024 Surrealism and Us: Caribbean and African Diasporic Artists since 1940, Modern Art Museum of Fort Worth
- 2025 Duet, Water Street Projects, WSA Building, New York, NY
- 2025 From the Studio: Fifty Eight Years of Artists-in-Residence, The Studio Museum in Harlem, New York, NY
- 2025 Paul Gardère: Second Nature, Magenta Plans, New York, NY

== Selected awards and residencies ==
- 1989-90 Artist-in-Residence, Studio Museum in Harlem, New York
- 1991 New York Foundation of the Arts Fellowship
- 1993 Lila Acheson Wallace / Arts International Residence at Giverny, France
- 1993-94 Artist-in-Residence, Long Island University, Brooklyn Campus
- 1998 Joan Mitchell Foundation Award for Painting

== Selected collections ==
- Zimmerli Art Museum
- Museum of Modern Art
- Studio Museum in Harlem
- The Columbus Museum
- Beinecke Library at Yale University
- New Orleans Museum of Art
- Figge Art Museum
- Schomburg Center for Research in Black Culture
- National Museum of African American History and Culture
