= Gina Athena Ulysse =

Haitian-American anthropologist, feminist, poet, performance artist

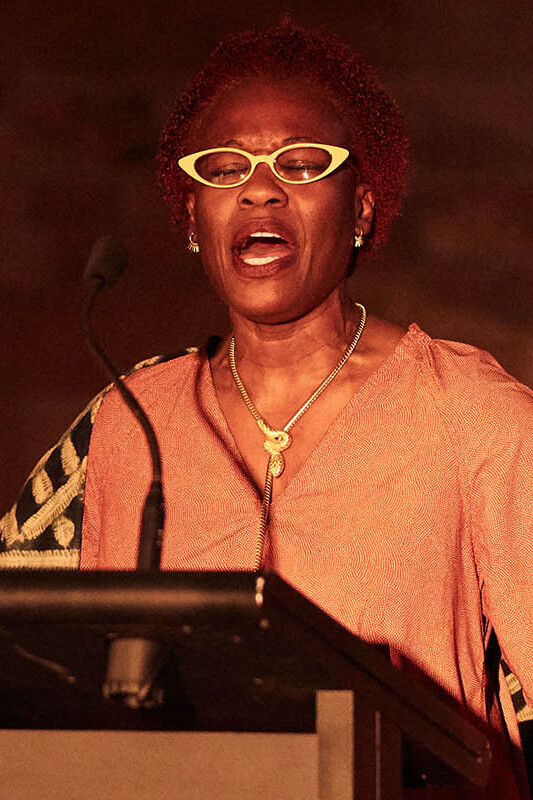
- Ulysse in 2020
- Born: 1966 (age 59–60); Pétion-Ville, Haiti

Academic background
- Education: University of Michigan (MA, PhD); Upsala College (BA)

Academic work
- Discipline: Anthropology, Feminist Studies, Performance Art
- Institutions: University of California, Santa Cruz (UCSC); Wesleyan University
- Notable works: Because When God Is Too Busy, A Call to Rasanblaj
- Website: ginaathenaulysse.com

Gina Athena Ulysse (born 1966) is an interdisciplinary artist and scholar and writer whose body of work focuses on the visceral in the structural. Committed to ethnography, she uses a rasanblaj approach (gathering of ideas, things, people, and spirits) to her research questions, which are rooted in traditions of Black feminism to engage geopolitics, historical representations, aesthetics, and the spiritual in the dailiness of Black diasporic conditions. Her art and writing practice entail ongoing crossings and dialogues between the arts, humanities, and social sciences. She was a Bogliasco fellow in 2024 and a MacDowell fellow in 2025.

== Early life and education ==
Ulysse was born in Petion-Ville, Haiti and attended Anne-Marie Javouhey, an order of the Sisters of St. Joseph de Cluny. In 1978, she immigrated to the United States with her family during the Jean-Claude “Baby doc” Duvalier dictatorship. She holds a B.A. in Anthropology and English from Upsala College. She earned a Ph.D. in Anthropology from the University of Michigan. "Gina Athena Ulysse".

== Career ==
Currently, she is Professor of Humanities at the University of California, Santa Cruz. She is the Founding Director of the Rasanblaj Praxis Project Lab.

She is the first artist-in-residence of the American Ethnological Association. She is the editor of the Rasanblaj section of Anthropology Now Review published by Taylor and Francis. Her articles, essays, poetry, and visual art have been featured in Feminist Studies, Journal of Haitian Studies, Kerb: Journal of Landscape Architecture, Transition, and Third Text to name a few. Ulysse was an invited artist to the Biennale of Sydney (2020) and Biennale of Dakar (2024).

== Honors and awards ==
- MacDowell Residency Fellow (2024)
- Bogliasco Foundation Fellowship (2023)
- Excellence in Teaching Award, UCSC (2021-2022)
- Connecticut Book Award for Poetry (2018)
- AAA Anthropology in Media Award (2018)
- Haitian Studies Association Excellence in Scholarship Award (2015)
- Wesleyan University Binswanger Prize for Excellence in Teaching (2015)

== Selected publications ==
=== Books ===
- A Call to Rasanblaj: Black Feminist Futures and Ethnographic Aesthetics (2023) "A Call to Rasanblaj: Black Feminist Futures and Ethnographic Aesthetics".
- Because When God Is Too Busy: Haiti, me & THE WORLD (2017) "Because When God Is Too Busy".
- Why Haiti Needs New Narratives: A Post-Quake Chronicle (2015) "Why Haiti Needs New Narratives".
- Downtown Ladies: Informal Commercial Importers, a Haitian Anthropologist and Self-Making in Jamaica (2007) "Downtown Ladies".

=== Editor ===
- “Caribbean Rasanblaj.” Double issue of e-misférica—NYU’s Hemispheric Institute for Performance and Politics. 2015, vol 12, no 1&2, May. Online Journal. https://hemisphericinstitute.org/en/emisferica-121-caribbean-rasanblaj.html
- “Pawol Fanm Sou Douz Janvye” (Women’s Words on January 12). A collection of women’s stories of Haiti’s 2010 earthquake and its aftermath in the Archives section of Meridians Journal of Feminism, Race and Transnationalism. January 2012, Introduction pp 91–98, article pp141–143. https://www.jstor.org/stable/10.2979/meridians.11.1.91?seq=1

=== Journals and art catalogs ===
- “Bwapin Rasanblaj: A Curated Conversation” Cover, art essay and interview with Lyndon K. Gill. Special issue on Autotheory/Autoethnography. Feminist Studies journal. 2023, Volume 49, No 1-2, December. https://muse.jhu.edu/article/915912
- “Constant’s Consort and Marvelous Work” Interview Essay in Exhibition catalog, Fowler Museum. Katherine Smith, Jerry Philogene, editors. Los Angeles: University of California Press. 2023, pp 49–61. https://fowler.ucla.edu/product/myrlande-constant-work-radiance/
- "Nou La: Didier William's Spaciousness" Sugarcane Art Magazine, December 2022. https://sugarcanemag.com/2022/11/nou-la-didier-williams-spaciousness-by-gina-athena-ulysse/
- “Calabash/Kalbas/Kwi: Personal Journey of Diasporic Returns” Etnográfica Special 25th Year Anniversary Issue, December 2022. https://journals.openedition.org/etnografica/12690
- “A Priestess’s Salutation: A Study in Movement” Cover and photo essay in honor of Rachel Beauvoir Dominique with Trilingual translation. Frontiers Journal. 2022, Volume 43, Issue 3, December.
- “Avant-Garde Rasanblaj: Meditations on Pòtoprens” in Pòtoprens: The Urban Artists of Port-au-Prince. Exhibition catalog, PioneerWorks Leah Gordon and Joshua Jelly-Shapiro, editors. Brooklyn, New York: Pioneer Works. 2022, pp 292–299. https://pioneerworks.org/broadcast/gina-athena-ulysse-potoprens
- “Skin Castles: Some Not so Random Notes on Performing a Taxonomy of Rages against Empire” in Special Issue: Exhibiting the Experience of Empire: Decolonizing Objects, Images, Materials and Words. Guest Editors: John Giblin, Imma Ramos and Nikki Grout. Third Text: Critical Perspectives on Contemporary Art and Culture. July–September 2019 no 159-160 pp 521–540. https://www.tandfonline.com/doi/full/10.1080/09528822.2019.1654780
- “Why Rasanblaj. Why Now?: New Salutations to the Four Cardinal Points in Haitian Studies” in Journal of Haitian Studies. 2017, vol 23, no 2, pp 58–80. https://muse.jhu.edu/pub/259/article/688084
- Pwen #1,4, 7, 9, 11, 14 & 16 of “VooDooDoll: What if Haiti Were a Woman.” Transition Magazine, Special Haiti issue. Editors: Laurent Dubois and Kaiama Glover. 2013, June, issue 111, pp 104–111. https://transitionmagazine.fas.harvard.edu/issues/issue-111/
- “The Spirits in My Mother’s Head, excerpts from Loving Haiti, Loving Vodou” in PoetryMemoirStory. Special Issue on Black Women Writers. Honoree Jeffers, editor. 2008, no 8, pp 113–119.
- “Papa, Patriarchy and Power: Snapshots of a Good Haitian Girl, Feminism and Dyasporic Dreams” in Journal of Haitian Studies. 2006, vol 12, no 1, pp 24–47. https://www.jstor.org/stable/41716760?seq=1
- “Conquering Duppies in Kingston: Miss Tiny and Me, Fieldwork Conflicts and Being Loved and Rescued” in Anthropology and Humanism. 2002, vol 27, no 1, pp 10–26. https://anthrosource.onlinelibrary.wiley.com/doi/abs/10.1525/anhu.2002.27.1.10

== See also ==
- Black feminism
- Public anthropology
- Decolonial aesthetics
- Performance ethnography
