= Carmelau Monestime =

Haitian-born American community leader, activist and broadcaster

Carmelau Monestime (April 6, 1931 – January 16, 2016) was a Haitian-born American community leader, activist and broadcaster. Monestime was a pioneer of Haitian Creole radio broadcasting in South Florida. In 1978, Monestime co-established Express Publicite Radio on WMBM, the first Haitian radio show to be broadcast in South Florida and the Miami metropolitan area. Express Publicite Radio aired on WMBM (1490 AM) for thirty years. Monestime also established and launched Radio Collective Internationale on 99.1 FM, the first radio station to be owned and operated by Haitians and Haitian Americans.

Monestime was born in Gonaïves, Haiti, on April 6, 1931. He fled from Haiti to the United States in 1964 to escape the dictatorship of François "Papa Doc" Duvalier. He settled to New York City. During the 1960s and 1970s, Monestime operated some of the first Haitian nightclubs in New York City, including The Flatbush Terrace, which was located in Brooklyn.

In 1977, he and his wife, Elvire Monestime, moved from New York to Miami, Florida. He owned his driving school, Panorama Express Driving School, which he opened shortly after relocating to Miami.

Monestime became a noted broadcaster and activist for the Haitian community in South Florida. He lobbied the U.S. federal government to grant legal resident status to undocumented Haitian immigrants. According to Gepsie Metellus, the executive director of Sant La, a Haitian Neighborhood Center in Miami, "He was always at the forefront of significant community issues, whether it was the Haitian boat crisis or making sure our government would grant status to Haitians to make a new life in the U.S...He represents a lasting and important legacy … and a model and example for us to emulate in how we move forward."

In 1978, Monestime partnered with two colleagues, Pierre Mendes Alcindor, a psychology student, and Ferdinand Forté, a newscaster, to create the Express Publicite Radio on WMBM 1490-AM. Express Publicite Radio, which aired on WMBM for more than thirty years, was the first Haitian Creole radio show in South Florida. The show celebrated its 30th anniversary in 2008.

Carmelau Monestime died on January 16, 2016, at the age of 84. Monestime, who was predeceased by his wife, Elvire, was survived by his two sisters, four children, six grandchildren and five great-grandchildren.

== See also ==
- List of Haitian Americans
