= M. Rony Francois =

Director of the Georgia Division of Public Health
- In office 2010–2015
- Governor: Sonny Perdue; Nathan Deal

Secretary of the Florida Department of Health
- In office September 19, 2005 – January 2, 2007
- Governor: Jeb Bush
- Succeeded by: Ana Viamonte Ros

Personal details
- Born: Port-au-Prince, Haiti
- Party: Independent
- Education: University of Central Florida; University of South Florida
- Profession: Doctor, health administrator, professor

M. Rony Francois is an American doctor, health administrator, and academic professor. He is currently the Director of the Georgia Division of Public Health. He previously served as Secretary of the Florida Department of Health under then Florida Governor Jeb Bush from 2005 to 2007.

Francois is an alumnus of the University of Central Florida and the University of South Florida. He earned his bachelor's degree and master's degree from UCF, where he was also a star on the Knights soccer team, and he graduated with his medical degree from South Florida in 1994.
