= Hoax (band) =

American band

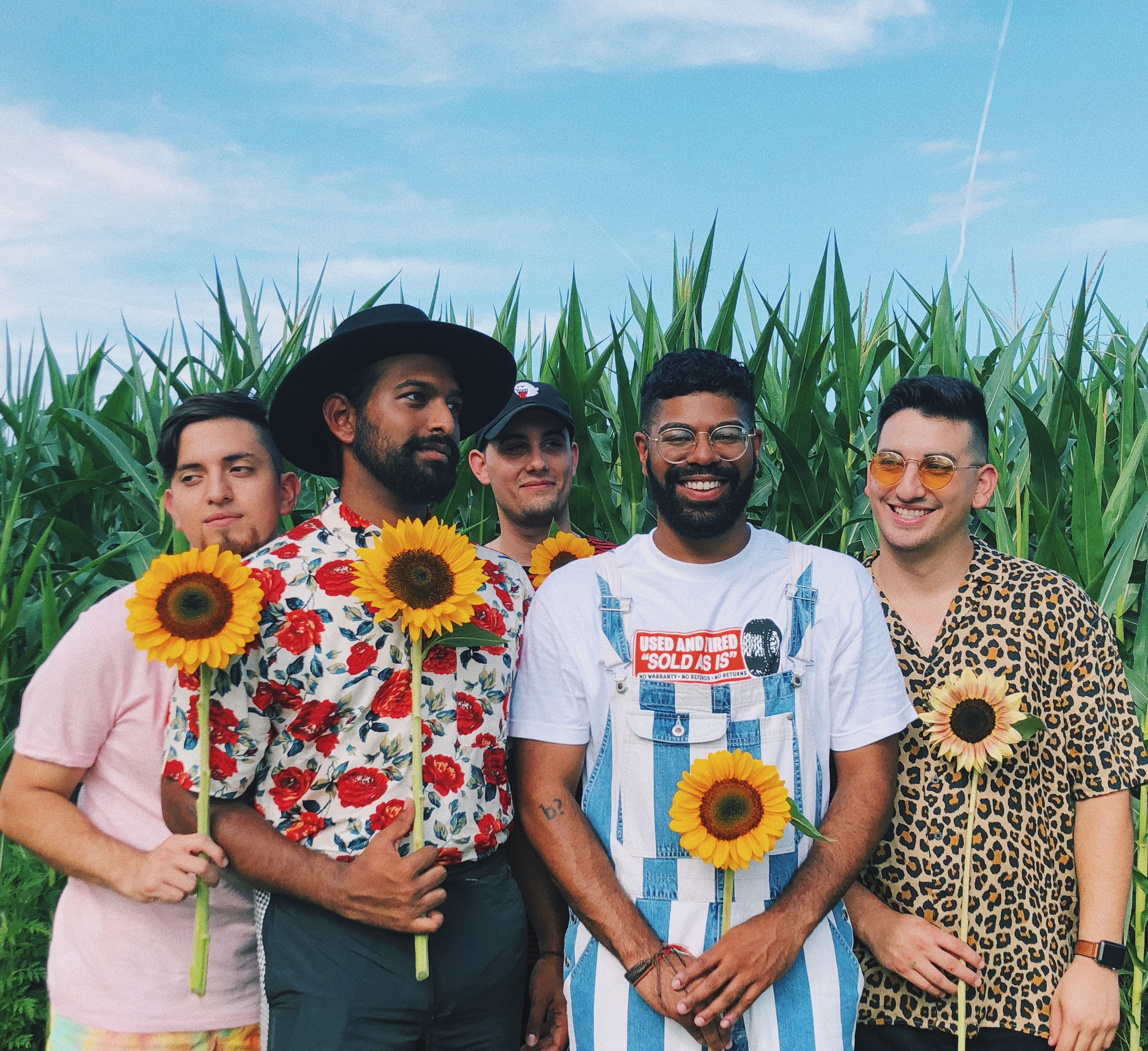
- Hoax in 2018

Background information
- Origin: Long Island, New York
- Genres: Indie pop, indie rock, alternative rock
- Instruments: Bass, guitar, drums
- Years active: 2016 - present
- Members: Michael P. Raj (vocals); Frantz N. Cesar (bass)
- Past members: Paul Brower (guitar); Kevin Lopez (guitar); Jacob Lopez (drums)
- Website: https://therealhoaxband.com

Hoax (stylized as HOAX) is an American indie pop band originating in Long Island, New York. The band is led by Michael P. Raj (vocals) and Frantz N. Cesar (bass).

== History ==
Michael P. Raj, of Indian descent, and Frantz N. Cesar, of Haitian and Puerto Rican descent, met while studying at Hofstra University in 2015. The two bonded and began creating music together in Raj's basement apartment in Long Island, New York. Cesar recruited his friends Jacob and Kevin Lopez to play drums and guitar, respectively. Paul Brower was then recruited as second guitarist. Songwriting and arrangements are primarily handled by Raj and Cesar.

Hoax released their debut single "Beach House" in July 2016. Their second single "Indian Summer" was released in September 2016 and peaked at #41 on Spotify's UK Viral Top 50 Chart. On June 16, 2017, Hoax released their first EP, The Truth and Other Lies. On September 29, 2017, the band released their second EP words that end with wh(y).

On August 31, 2018, Hoax released "Moon Moon Baby" which peaked at #150 on the iTunes Alternative Charts in France. The band released "Grow" on September 28, 2018, which Earmilk compared to Bee Gees and praised for having "a vintage feel while still maintaining to stay current." Brower and the Lopez brothers then left the band. Raj and Cesar continued as a duo and announced the full-length album b?, that has been released in 2020.

== Musical style and influences ==
Hoax is primarily labeled as a pop rock band but has been described as "empathy pop" and "the sound of beautiful sadness." Their musical style has been described as embodying a "strong sensibility for humanity and ... using their music to showcase and inspire empathy and kindness to others." Raj has cited Frank Ocean, Kendrick Lamar, Kanye West, The Doors, and Arctic Monkeys as inspiration, and that his greatest influences come from the writing of Ernest Hemingway and T.S. Eliot. He has also cited Steven Spielberg, Christopher Nolan, and David Fincher as inspirations, stating that their "cinematic visions really impacted my perspective on the importance of storytelling."

== Discography ==
=== Singles ===
- "Beach House" (2016)
- "Indian Summer" (2016)
- "Pretty" (2017)
- "Barely" (2017)
- "Moon Moon Baby" (2018)
- "Grow" (2018)
- "Unamerican Dream" (2019)
- "Could" (2019)
- “Someday” (2023)
- “Clouds” (2023)
- “Into the Blackhole” (2023)
- “magnolia” (2025)

=== EPs ===
- The Truth and Other Lies (2017)
- words that end with wh(y) (2017)
- b? sides (2023)

=== Albums ===
- b? (2022)
