= Fred Staten =

- Born: 1937; Haiti
- Died: December 1998 (aged 60–61)
- Occupations: Occultist, voodoo priest
- Known for: Voodoo King of New Orleans

Fred Staten (1937 – December 1998) was a New Orleans nightclub performer commonly known as the Chicken Man, although he styled himself Prince Keeyama and a voodoo priest.

== Biography ==
Staten was born in Haiti in 1937 and later moved to New Orleans where he established a voodoo temple. He became known as the Chicken Man for infamously biting off the heads of live chicken while performing his voodoo rituals. He was taught by his Haitian grandparents the voodoo arts.
