= Elsie Augustave =

Haitian-American author

Elsie Augustave (born in Haiti) is a Haitian-American author. Her debut novel, The Roving Tree (Akashic Books, 2013), follows a young Haitian adoptee, Iris Odys, through various journeys across the world. Odys is the rejected daughter of a Haitian maid and of the middle-class Haitian man who employs her. In addition to the struggle for identity of cross-cultural adoptees, the book explores themes of class, color and religion in Haiti. McArthur prize winner Edwidge Danticat described the book to The New York Times as "a gorgeous new novel about a Haitian adoptee finding her way in many different corners of the world."

== Early life ==
Augustave describes her childhood as typical of that of many Haitian migrants. Her parents—who are from Lascahobas and Cabaret, Haiti—migrated to the United States to flee the François Duvalier dictatorship, leaving her and siblings with relatives in Haiti. When the family sent for her in 1967, she moved to Spring Valley, New York at a time when there were only one or two other Haitian families. She had just completed her elementary education. Augustave says that the only thing she has in common with her character Iris is the countries they have visited.

== Education and career ==
Augustave is a graduate of Middlebury College and Howard University, with degrees in foreign language and literature. She has been a Fulbright Fellow in France and Senegal and choreographed the production Elima Ngando for the National Dance Theater of Zaire, now Democratic Republic of Congo. She taught French and Spanish at Stuyvesant High School in NYC from 1984 to 2015 and is a consultant at The College Board. Augustave says her Fulbright fellowship in France and Senegal informed her ability to describe her character Iris' cultural experiences.
