= Haitian Americans =

Americans of Haitian birth or descent

Haïtien Américain Ayisyen Ameriken
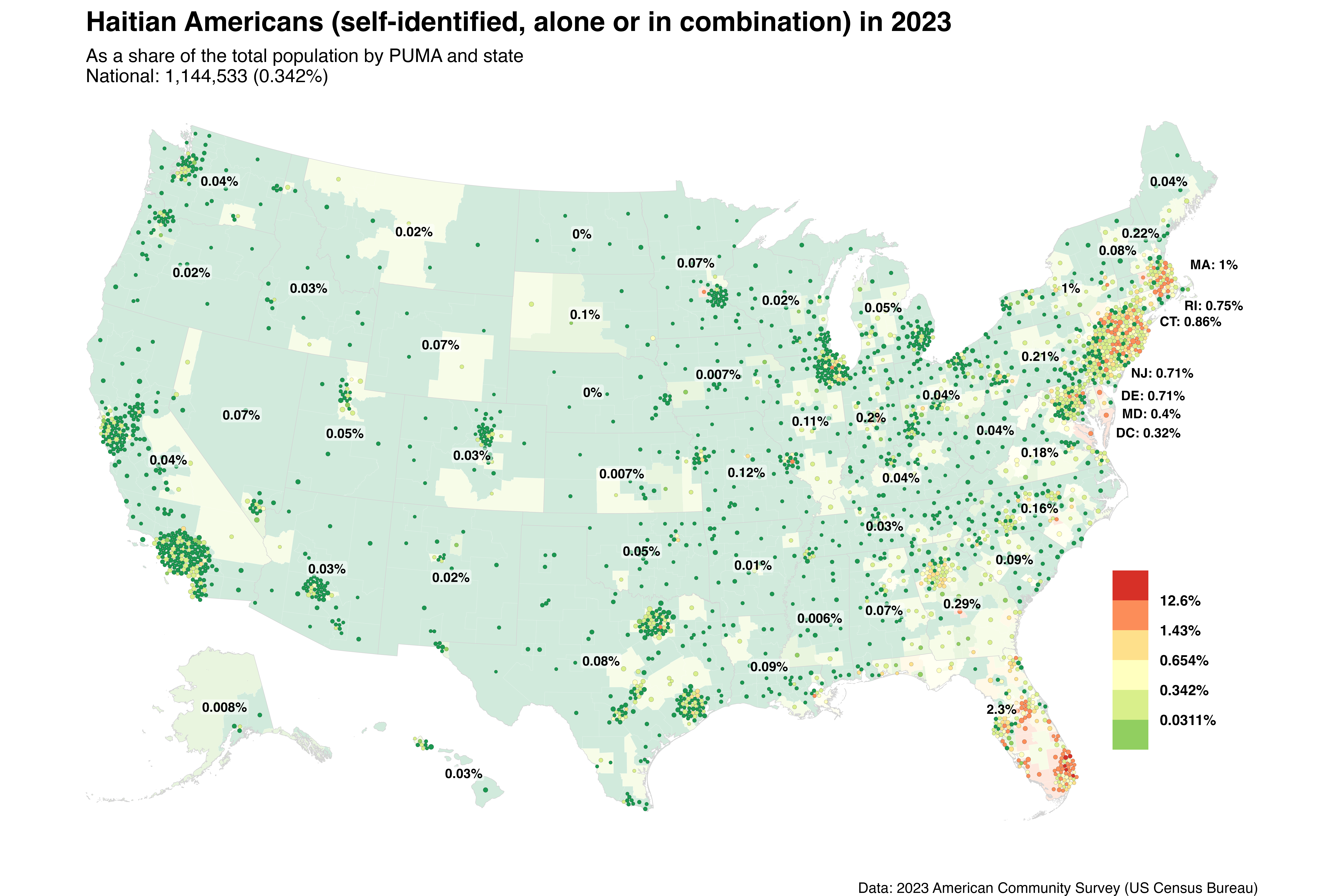

Total population
- 1,138,855 (2022); 0.34% of the U.S. population (2019)

Regions with significant populations
- Majority concentrated in the metropolitan areas of Miami, Orlando, New York and Boston. Historical population (1800s) in the New Orleans area. Majority in states include Florida, Georgia, New York, Massachusetts, Pennsylvania and New Jersey; Smaller numbers in other parts of the country including Rhode Island, Connecticut, Delaware, Maryland, Virginia, North Carolina, Louisiana, Oklahoma and Texas

Languages
- English, French, Haitian Creole, Franglais

Religion
- Predominantly Roman Catholicism with considerable adherents of Protestantism · Mormonism · Jehovah's Witnesses · also Haitian Vodou · New Orleans Voodoo

Related ethnic groups
- Haitians, Taíno, West Africans, Haitian Canadians, French Americans, Louisiana Creoles, Afro-Haitians, Mulatto Haitians, White Haitians, African Americans, Hispanic and Latino Americans, Arab Americans, Indian Americans, Chinese Americans, Native Americans

Haitian Americans (French: Haïtiens-Américains; Haitian Creole: Ayisyen Ameriken) are a group of Americans of full or partial Haitian origin or descent. The largest population of Haitian citizens in the United States live in Little Haiti to the South Florida area. In addition, they have sizeable populations in major Northeast cities such as New York City, Boston, Philadelphia, Baltimore and Washington, D.C., and in Chicago, Springfield, and Detroit in the Midwest. Most are immigrants or their descendants from the mid-late 20th-century and ongoing 21st century migrations to the United States. Haitian Americans represent the largest group within the Haitian diaspora.

In 2021, the U.S. Census estimated that 1,138,855 people of full or partial Haitian descent lived in the United States. During the 1960s and 1970s, many Haitians emigrated to the U.S. to escape the oppressive conditions during the dictatorships of François "Papa Doc" and his son Jean-Claude "Baby Doc" Duvalier.

Haitians are among the largest groups to have held Temporary protected status or TPS. Haiti was designated in 2010 after a major earthquake, and the designation was extended and expanded in 2021, covering an estimated 330,000 people by 2026. The first Trump administration announced the end of Haiti's TPS in 2017, but court injunctions kept it in force until the Biden administration redesignated Haiti in 2021. The second Trump administration announced a new termination in June 2025, which courts blocked until the Supreme Court's decision in Mullin v. Doe in June 2026 allowed it to proceed. TPS for Haiti ended on July 27, 2026.

== History ==
During the 18th century, the French colony of Saint-Domingue was the richest in the Caribbean due to its massive production of sugar cane. This wealth was concentrated in the hands of a small minority of mostly French and European planters, who used slave labor from Sub-Saharan Africa to cultivate, harvest, and process their crops. Beginning in 1791, slaves (who formed about 90 percent of the population) revolted against their masters, fought against invading forces, and succeeded in forcing France to abolish slavery.

When France attempted later to reintroduce slavery, the former slaves again revolted and won their independence in 1804, declaring the Republic of Haiti the second republic in the Western Hemisphere. The rebellion proved disruptive to the country's economy, however. Many wealthy colonists left, both white and free people of color. The freedmen wanted to cultivate their own plots rather than work on plantations. Many refugees from Saint-Domingue emigrated to the United States, taking their slaves with them, particularly to the New Orleans region, where they reinforced the existing French-speaking and African populations. Though France and the Spanish-speaking Caribbean (Cuba, Santo Domingo and Puerto Rico) were other major destinations for many immigrants, the United States was a much more popular destination.

During the early 19th century, many immigrants from colonial-era Haiti (St. Domingue) helped found settlements in the French Empire, which would later be the sites of Chicago and Detroit in the modern-day United States. During the Haitian Revolution, many white French left Haiti for the New Orleans region because of its strong French connection, despite being a part of the United States by then. They brought slaves with them, an action that doubled the black population in the New Orleans region. Haitian influence includes that of Haitian Creole on the Louisiana Creole language and Haitian Vodou on the Louisiana Voodoo religion. Though these things were already present in the region, the Haitian presence made it stronger. The Haitian descended population has since been heavily mixed into the general Louisiana black population as a whole.

While most of the early 20th-century emigrants from Haiti were from the upper classes, persistent conditions of poverty, as well as political unrest, eventually prodded many lower-class Saint Dominicans to emigrate as well. Altogether, there have been four periods of major migration to the United States in the history of Haiti: the initial wave at the turn of the 20th century, following the U.S. occupation from 1915 to 1934, during the 1960s and 1970s to escape the Duvalier regime, and following the 2004 overthrow of Jean-Bertrand Aristide.

=== 20th century ===
Between 1957 and 1986, when the Duvaliers ruled Haiti, their political persecution of the opposition and suspected activists resulted in many Haitian professionals, the middle class, and students emigrating to other countries, among them the United States, France, Dominican Republic and Canada (primarily Montreal). Between 1972 and 1977, 200,000 Haitians landed in South Florida, many of them settling in the neighborhood of Little Haiti.

In the late 20th century, there was a significant brain drain from Haiti as thousands of doctors, teachers, social workers and entrepreneurs emigrated to several cities in the East, particularly to New York City and Miami. Other Haitians worked in restaurants and music stores. In the early 1980s, 40,000 Haitians who came to the United States seeking political asylum achieved permanent resident status. In 1991, there was another wave of Haitian emigration by boat. But the administration of President Bill Clinton tried to discourage Haitian immigration. People were either detained and/or sent back to Haiti. Still, between 1995 and 1998, 50,000 Haitians obtained temporary legal status.

=== Immigration today ===
Political strife, marked with corruption and intimidation, led to many Haitians leaving the island for the opportunity of a better life. Suffering from a lack of education, many have had difficulty flourishing in the United States. However, trends have shown strong signs of assimilation. Haitian American children of immigrants have higher rates of education than those in Haiti, and experience better economic outcomes than their parents. Waves of Haitians made it to the shores of Florida, seeking asylum. Most of the foreign-born Haitians arrived during the mid- to late 20th century.

Today, Florida has the largest number of people of Haitian heritage. In 2000, Florida had 182,224 foreign-born Haitians, 43.5% of the total foreign-born population from Haiti in the United States (this number did not include U.S.-born citizens of Haitian heritage). New York had the second-largest population of foreign-born Haitians, with 125,475, approximately 30% of the total. Haitian illegal immigrants continue to attempt to reach the shores of Florida and are routinely swept up by the United States Coast Guard. They are often repatriated. Civil rights groups have protested this treatment, remarking on the contrast to the asylum granted between the late 1950s and January 2017 to Cuban refugees. In January 2023, President Joe Biden announced the extension of a humanitarian parole program to accept up to 30,000 migrants a month from Cuba, Haiti, Nicaragua and Venezuela. Nearly 40,000 Haitians have entered the U.S. under this program from January to April 2023. The Trump administration moved to end TPS protections for Haitians in 2025, with the termination originally set to take effect on February 3, 2026. A federal judge blocked the termination in February 2026, but on June 25, 2026, the Supreme Court ruled in Mullin v. Doe that the termination could proceed, clearing the way for the removal of protections for roughly 350,000 Haitian TPS holders.

== Culture ==
=== Language and religion ===
Most recent Haitian immigrants speak Haitian Creole and are either familiar with or have learned English. In Haiti, French is an official language but is not widely spoken or fully understood. Most Haitians speak Creole in daily life. More than 90% of the vocabulary of Creole is of French origin (with some secondary influences from Taíno, West African languages, Portuguese and Spanish), which provides some limited mutual intelligibility between the two languages; however, its grammar and pronunciation display considerable West African influence. Most native-born Haitian Americans speak English fluently, as do many immigrants. Many Spanish-speaking countries like Cuba and Dominican Republic have significant Haitian populations, and many Haitians who have lived there before moving to the United States have some knowledge of Spanish, if not fluency.

Most Haitian Americans are Roman Catholic, with Protestant communities being the second largest religious group. There are also communities of Mormons and Jehovah's Witnesses. Some individuals practice Vodoun while officially following one of the main religious groups. Religion is very important in the life of Haitian Americans.

=== Adjustment and communities ===
The Haitians who emigrated to the United States brought many of their cultural practices and ideologies, as do all immigrants. Many foreign-born Haitians have set up their own businesses, initially to serve their communities. Thus, many established barbershops, bodegas and restaurants (predominately of Haitian cuisine). Around half of Haitians in the United States are in the state of Florida. Haitian Americans have a visible cultural presence in Little Haiti, Miami and several nearby communities, such as Golden Glades and North Miami. The northern portions of the Miami metropolitan area have the highest concentrations of Haitians in the country, including Broward County and northern Miami-Dade County. Miami-Dade County has the largest number of Haitians, with 130,438, followed by Broward and Palm Beach counties. Outside of South Florida, there are Haitian communities growing in the rest of the state, especially the Orlando area.

Other significant Haitian-American communities are found in several neighborhoods of New York City, such as Prospect Heights, Flatbush (Nostrand), Crown Heights, Gravesend, Park Slope, Brownsville, Flatlands, Lefferts Gardens, East Flatbush, Bensonhurst, Midwood, Kensington, Canarsie and Bushwick in Brooklyn, Jamaica, Hollis, Cambria Heights, Queens Village, Springfield Gardens, South Jamaica, Holliswood, Laurelton and Rosedale in Queens, as well as Long Island and Rockland. However, Central Brooklyn, especially the Flatbush section, has the largest Haitian concentration in the New York City area and the 2nd largest in the country outside South Florida. In 2018, a section of Flatbush, Brooklyn, that stretches from East 16th Street to Parkside Avenue, to Brooklyn Avenue, and along Church Avenue between East 16th Street and Albany Avenue, was designated Little Haiti. Assemblymember Rodneyse Bichotte was the 'driving force' behind the successful designation of the Little Haiti Cultural and Business District. Following the designation of Little Haiti, thirty blocks of Rogers Avenue between Farragut Road and Eastern Parkway were co-named Jean-Jacques Dessalines Boulevard. The street co-naming was a tribute to Jean-Jacques Dessalines, a former slave who led Haiti to victory, making it the first Latin American country to declare independence from colonial rule and the first black republic.

The Mattapan section of Boston is considered the main center of Haitians in the city, though there are many other parts of the Boston area with significant numbers of Haitians. Growing Haitian communities have also formed in many other cities in the Northeast, like Providence, Philadelphia, and North Jersey (Newark/Jersey City). In such centers, everyday conversations on the street may take place in Haitian Creole. Smaller and fast-growing Haitian populations are also growing in the metropolitan areas of D.C., Atlanta, Chicago, Houston, Dallas, Charlotte, and New Orleans. Second-generation Haitian Americans have begun to gain higher-paying occupations, such as doctors and lawyers, and achieve higher levels of education. Several Haitian Americans have become professional athletes, mostly in the National Football League.

Significant Haitian populations are located in the U.S. territories of Puerto Rico and the U.S. Virgin Islands. In Puerto Rico, Haitians receive refugee asylum, similar to the Wet feet, dry feet policy for Cubans going to Florida.

=== Youth ===
Since the 1950s, a new generation of Haitian immigrants have entered the nation's schools. They have been a growing and ethnically diverse segment of America's child population. These Haitian (American) youth are diverse in the ways that they identify with Haiti and participate within their different communities.

These youth vary between those born in the U.S. of immigrant parents, those who immigrated with their families as small children, those who immigrated recently under duress (such as after the 2010 earthquake), and those who have come to attend colleges and universities. Many scholars refer to these Haitian youth as the "new second generation." They say that identity formation among Haitian youth is based on many different factors, including first-generation modes of adaptation, parental socio-economic status, length and place of residency, certain social constructions of a pluralistic American society (such as racism), as well as others.

Education is a significant factor in the lives of Haitian American youth, particularly among those who aspire towards certain professions such as medicine and law. Many Haitian youth who immigrate have been trained in top Haitian middle schools, high schools, and colleges that prepare them for such pursuits. Because of this, many Haitian youth come to the United States in order to enter college. (See Harvard University’s Haitian Student Association for an example of a strong group of Haitian American and Haitian students). In other cases, parents who do not have access to high-quality schools in Haiti may move to the United States to offer their children better opportunities.

=== Cuisine ===
Haiti's national dish, diri ak pwa (rice and beans or bean sauce) accompanied by griot (fried pork), illustrates the blend that invigorates the simple essence of Manje Kreyòl (Creole cuisine). Griyo and tasso (deep-fried beef or goat) are commonly available in many Haitian restaurants across the United States.

== Media and social media presence ==
=== The Relief Effort ===
After the 2010 earthquake, the United States, the Government of Haiti and many countries around the world worked in tandem to manage global responses. The United States used social media platforms to keep up-to-date with information about the progress of relief and aid work.

By the end of the first week of social media use, post earthquake, Haiti was the topic of one-third of all Twitter posts and the outlets to raise funds for relief aid had amassed $8 million.

Social media was also used to update outside aid on on-the-ground happenings of relief for the subsequent Cholera outbreak. Haitian-Americans and Haitians living in the continental U.S. used social media, such as Sakapfet (a web board on which Haitians can post what is happening where they are and where sought-after people were last seen), to inquire about loved ones living on the island. Twitter also provided up-to-date information and continues to do so in the wake of Hurricane Matthew (October 2016). Twitter also serves as a platform for Haitian Americans to speak out against the above-mentioned U.S. aid. Some Haitian Americans argue that the donations amassed in 2010 have had little effect on actually changing and/or aiding Haiti. Also in the wake of Hurricane Matthew, Haitian Americans in Georgia and South Florida have created their own organizations, for example, the Haitian American Nurses Association of Florida, to provide aid to Haiti, themselves.

=== Bloggers and social media ===
Haitian-Americans have been taking advantage of digital technologies and developments since they became available; for example, the employment of radio shows, such as Radyo Lekòl (or School Radio), to talk about Haitian life in an American context. In more recent times, however, Haitian Americans have taken to the internet as a forum. Many have sought to fill what they believe is the void of diversity among influential social media users. Haitian-American artists, famous personalities, and social media influencers have also used platform, like Instagram, Twitter, and Facebook to shed light on Haiti's struggles. Figures such as Kodak Black, Wyclef Jean, Pras Michel, and Garcelle Beauvais have utilized their presence to promote aid and solidarity for Haiti. By reaching an audience and leveraging their celebrity status, they have drawn attention to the challenges faced by the country.

Haitian-American bloggers and influencers in the media have established virtual communities to engage in discussions about Haitian culture, politics, and societal issues. Social media channels have transformed into hubs for conversations and advocacy efforts where Haitian Americans can connect with each other and exchange viewpoints on Haiti and its diaspora.

=== Transnationalism ===
Transnationalism in the Haitian community, the focus is on their strong emotional ties to their homeland and the process of forming new connections in their new country. Research shows how Haitian transnationalism plays out, emphasizing the significance of family relationships in society, culture, and political awareness. Many have attempted to understand the obstacles that Haitian Americans encounter as they confront stereotypes based on race and ethnicity while engaging in activities within their communities, but due to the lack of Haitian-American representation, efforts often fall on deaf ears.

Economically, many Haitian-Americans engage in transnational activities such as remittances, where they send money back to family members in Haiti to support their financial needs. These remittances serve as a lifeline for many families in Haiti and contribute significantly to the country's economy. Additionally, some Haitian immigrants may invest in businesses or properties in Haiti, further deepening their economic ties to the homeland.

Culturally, Haitian traditions, language, and customs are honored as a way to express their intersecting identities. Even while living in the US, Haitian-Americans stay connected to their roots through religious rituals, music, food, and celebrations. This ongoing cultural legacy helps them hold onto their identity and creates a sense of unity and belonging among the diaspora. Many Haitian communities around the United States have holidays dedicated to the celebration of Haitian culture, with Haitian Flag Day being an important holiday amongst Haitian-Americans.

Transnationalism impacts Haitian-Americans by causing several challenges, such as a feeling of dislocation and a lack of security and belonging. These challenges often stem from the navigation of dual identities and the emotional toll of separation from family and homeland. In addition, political discourse and natural disasters in Haiti can exacerbate these challenges, prompting Haitian-Americans to grapple with feelings of guilt or helplessness as they try to support their loved ones from afar.

=== Haitian Americans in media ===
In the 1980s, Jean-Michel Basquiat, known for his groundbreaking contributions to the art world as a neo-expressionist painter, drew inspiration from his Haitian ancestry, infusing his work with elements of African and Caribbean culture. His heritage played a significant role in shaping his artistic vision and unique aesthetic, as seen in his exploration of identity, race, and socio-political themes throughout his oeuvre. A key component of his visual language was the artwork and symbolism he combined from African and Haitian Vodou cultures. Crowns, masks, and skeletal figures connected to African spirituality and Vodou customs—were frequently used in Basquiat's artwork. He also shows his interest in the historical and cultural legacy of Haiti and the larger African diaspora by delving into topics like colonialism, slavery, and the African diaspora.

In 2003, Garcelle Beauvais became the first Haitian-American to appear on the cover of Playboy. She is now an established actress and TV personality, having worked in starring roles on the sitcom The Jamie Foxx Show and the crime drama series NYPD Blue.

In 2011, Raoul Peck became the first Haitian-born American to be nominated for an Academy Award for his documentary "I Am Not Your Negro." He is known for his continued work in filmmaking, with recent projects including the film "Silver Dollar Road" and the bio-documentary drama "The Young Karl Marx."

In 2014, Edwidge Danticat received the MacArthur Foundation "Genius" Grant, becoming the first Haitian-American to do so. She is also known for her advocacy on issues such as immigration and human rights, using her platform to raise awareness and support marginalized communities.

In 2017, Roxane Gay's book Hunger: A Memoir of (My) Body became a New York Times bestseller, making her the first Haitian-American to achieve this. She also contributes to various publications and continues to advocate for social justice issues.

In 2023, Rockstar Games debuted the trailer for their long-awaited game "Grand Theft Auto VI" showcasing vivid aspects of Little Haiti, a vibrant Florida neighborhood rich in Haitian culture.

In September 2024, a Facebook post falsely claimed that a Haitian immigrant in Springfield, Ohio stole her acquaintance's dog to kill and eat. These claims were amplified by Republican vice-presidential candidate JD Vance and Ted Cruz on X despite confirmation from the Springfield police department that the allegations were untrue. During a presidential debate with Kamala Harris, former President Donald Trump reiterated these claims. Republican figures and conservative social media outlets have continued to spread misinformation concerning the topic. Haitian Americans in Ohio have faced race based attacks due to these claims. Despite substantial negative reactions and ridicule, Trump doubled down on these claims in a rally and falsely asserted that Haitian immigrants were walking away with geese from public areas in Springfield. Furthermore, he has vowed to mass deport migrants from Springfield despite bomb threats to schools there and the town at large.

From May 13, 2022 to January 20, 2025, Karine Jean-Pierre served as the 35th White House press secretary for the Biden Administration. Also from 2024 to 2025, as a senior advisor to President Joe Biden.

== Demographics ==
=== U.S. states with largest Haitian populations ===
According to a 2022 census estimate, there were 1,138,855 Haitian Americans living in the United States

The 10 U.S. states with the largest populations of Haitian ancestry in 2022 were:

1. Florida – 544,043 (2.4% of the state population)
2. New York – 176,287 (0.8%)
3. Massachusetts – 77,054 (1.1%)
4. New Jersey – 70,177 (0.7%)
5. Georgia – 61,575 (0.5%)
6. Pennsylvania – 21,276 (0.1%)
7. Connecticut – 20,735 (0.6%)
8. Maryland – 18,444 (0.3%)
9. Texas – 16,290 (Less than 0.1%)
10. California – 16,052 (Less than 0.1%)

| State/Territory | 2020 census | % (2020) | Haitian population (2010) | % (2010) |
|---|---|---|---|---|
| Alabama | 2,530 | 0.0% | 1,121 | 0.0% |
| Alaska | 247 | 0.0% | 335 | 0.0% |
| Arizona | 3,132 | 0.0% | 792 | 0.0% |
| Arkansas | 618 | 0.0% | 423 | 0.0% |
| California | 15,528 | 0.1% | 7,538 | 0.0% |
| Colorado | 2,158 | 0.0% | 754 | 0.0% |
| Connecticut | 21,078 | 0.7% | 18,345 | 0.5% |
| Delaware | 5,632 | 0.6% | 2,555 | 0.3% |
| District of Columbia | 1,152 | 0.2% | 1,095 | 0.2% |
| Florida | 456,362 | 2.2% | 380,005 | 2.0% |
| (Georgia (U.S. state)) Georgia | 30,853 | 0.3% | 22,360 | 0.2% |
| Hawaii | 687 | 0.1% | 482 | 0.0% |
| Idaho | 374 | 0.0% | 245 | 0.0% |
| Illinois | 9,742 | 0.1% | 7,639 | 0.0% |
| Indiana | 7,126 | 0.1% | 1,721 | 0.0% |
| Iowa | 1,186 | 0.1% | 276 | 0.0% |
| Kansas | 1,196 | 0.1% | 664 | 0.0% |
| Kentucky | 2,268 | 0.1% | 1,121 | 0.0% |
| Louisiana | 3,474 | 0.1% | 1,729 | 0.0% |
| Maine | 715 | 0.1% | 364 | 0.0% |
| Maryland | 17,672 | 0.3% | 10,695 | 0.2% |
| Massachusetts | 87,328 | 1.4% | 63,915 | 0.9% |
| Michigan | 3,606 | 0.1% | 2,376 | 0.0% |
| Minnesota | 2,003 | 0.1% | 710 | 0.0% |
| Mississippi | 640 | 0.1% | 453 | 0.0% |
| Missouri | 2,948 | 0.1% | 1,278 | 0.0% |
| Montana | 170 | 0.0% | 47 | 0.0% |
| Nebraska | 489 | 0.0% | 309 | 0.0% |
| Nevada | 1,936 | 0.1% | 983 | 0.0% |
| New Hampshire | 1,674 | 0.2% | 1,591 | 0.2% |
| New Jersey | 71,670 | 0.9% | 54,761 | 0.6% |
| New Mexico | 520 | 0.0% | 218 | 0.0% |
| New York | 187,087 | 1.1% | 179,024 | 0.9% |
| North Carolina | 11,122 | 0.2% | 4,878 | 0.1% |
| North Dakota | 601 | 0.1% | 55 | 0.0% |
| Ohio | 5,286 | 0.1% | 2,912 | 0.0% |
| Oklahoma | 1,011 | 0.0% | 306 | 0.0% |
| Oregon | 1,454 | 0.1% | 601 | 0.0% |
| Pennsylvania | 28,136 | 0.3% | 19,433 | 0.2% |
| Rhode Island | 4,678 | 0.4% | 2,477 | 0.2% |
| South Carolina | 3,148 | 0.1% | 1,548 | 0.0% |
| South Dakota | 198 | 0.0% | 36 | 0.0% |
| Tennessee | 3,372 | 0.1% | 1,733 | 0.0% |
| Texas | 13,535 | 0.1% | 5,240 | 0.0% |
| Utah | 1,367 | 0.0% | 444 | 0.0% |
| Vermont | 251 | 0.0% | 91 | 0.0% |
| Virginia | 9,148 | 0.1% | 5,229 | 0.0% |
| Washington | 3,292 | 0.0% | 1,652 | 0.0% |
| West Virginia | 428 | 0.0% | 21 | 0.0% |
| Wisconsin | 1,412 | 0.1% | 613 | 0.0% |
| Wyoming | 90 | 0.0% | 3 | 0.0% |
| United States | 1,138,855 | 0.4% | 813,186 | 0.2% |

=== U.S. metropolitan areas with largest populations of Haitian origin ===
The largest communities of Haitian origin are found in the following metropolitan areas, according to the 2020 ACS 5-Year Estimates:

1. Miami-Fort Lauderdale-West Palm Beach, FL MSA – 335,708 (5.5% Haitian)
2. New York-Northern New Jersey-Long Island, NY-NJ-PA-CT MSA – 229,028 (1.2% Haitian)
3. Boston-Cambridge-Quincy, MA-NH MSA – 73,627 (1.6% Haitian)
4. Orlando-Kissimmee-Sanford, FL MSA – 61,201 (2.5% Haitian)
5. Atlanta-Sandy Springs-Alpharetta, GA MSA – 23,328 (0.4% Haitian)
6. Philadelphia-Camden-Wilmington, PA-NJ-DE-MD MSA – 23,113 (0.4% Haitian)
7. Tampa-St. Petersburg-Clearwater, FL MSA – 17,328 (0.6% Haitian)
8. Washington-Arlington-Alexandria, DC-VA-MD-WV MSA – 11,708 (0.2% Haitian)
9. Bridgeport-Stamford-Norwalk, CT MSA – 11,183 (1.2% Haitian)
10. Providence-Warwick, RI-MA MSA – 9,504 (0.5% Haitian)

=== Communities with largest populations of Haitian origin ===
The top 25 US communities with the largest populations of Haitians (Source: Census 2020)

1. New York City, NY – 116,756
2. Boston, MA – 21,079
3. North Miami, FL – 19,333
4. Brockton, MA – 13,716
5. Golden Glades, FL – 12,942
6. Philadelphia, PA – 12,329
7. Pine Hills, FL – 12,309
8. Miami, FL – 11,770
9. Boynton Beach, FL – 11,583
10. Miramar, FL – 11,416
11. Orlando, FL – 10,048
12. Pompano Beach, FL – 9,523
13. Fort Lauderdale, FL – 9,513
14. Miami Gardens, FL – 9,373
15. Lauderdale Lakes, FL – 9,004
16. Port St. Lucie, FL – 8,706
17. North Miami Beach, FL – 8,128
18. Coral Springs, FL – 8,004
19. North Lauderdale, FL – 6,948
20. Sunrise, FL – 6,474
21. Pembroke Pines, FL – 6,393
22. Jacksonville, FL – 6,165
23. West Palm Beach, FL – 6,155
24. Spring Valley, NY – 5,542
25. Hollywood, FL – 5,523

The 10 large cities (over 200,000 in population) with the highest percentages of Haitian residents include (2020 Census):

1. Port St. Lucie, FL – 4.2%
2. Orlando, FL – 3.2%
3. Boston, MA – 3.1%
4. Miami, FL – 2.6%
5. Newark, NJ – 1.3%
6. New York City, NY – 1.3%
7. Tampa, FL – 0.9%
8. Philadelphia, PA – 0.8%
9. Jersey City, NJ – 0.7%
10. Jacksonville, FL – 0.7%

=== High percentages of Haitian ancestry by community ===
The 36 U.S. communities in 2000 with the highest percentage of people claiming Haitian ancestry are:

| % | Community | State |
|---|---|---|
| 33.5% | Golden Glades | Florida |
| 33.0% | North Miami | Florida |
| 23.0% | El Portal | Florida |
| 23.0% | Spring Valley | New York |
| 19.9% | North Miami Beach | Florida |
| 18.3% | Randolph | Massachusetts |
| 15.7% | Lauderdale Lakes | Florida |
| 14.8% | Brockton | Massachusetts |
| 14.5% | Lake Park | Florida |
| 14.4% | Everett | Massachusetts |
| 13.9% | Ives Estates | Florida |
| 13.8% | Immokalee | Florida |
| 12.1% | Pine Hills | Florida |
| 11.5% | Belle Glade | Florida |
| 11.4% | Orange | New Jersey |
| 11.3% | New Cassel | New York |
| 11.1% | Irvington | New Jersey |
| 10.8% | North Valley Stream | New York |
| 10.7% | Elmont | New York |
| 10.5% | Delray Beach | Florida |
| 10.0% | Malden | Massachusetts |
| 9.2% | Biscayne Park | Florida |
| 9.2% | Mangonia Park | Florida |
| 9.1% | Lauderhill | Florida |
| 8.5% | Uniondale | New York |
| 8.3% | Miami Shores | Florida |
| 8.1% | Lake Worth | Florida |
| 8.0% | Roselle | New Jersey |
| 7.8% | Nyack | New York |
| 7.6% | South Nyack | New York |
| 7.3% | Medford | Massachusetts |
| 7.0% | Ramapo | New York |
| 7.0% | Oakland Park | Florida |
| 6.9% | Fort Lauderdale | Florida |
| 6.7% | Florida City | Florida |
| 6.7% | North Lauderdale | Florida |
| 6.7% | Wilton Manors | Florida |
| 6.4% | Asbury Park | New Jersey |
| 6.4% | Fort Pierce | Florida |
| 6.0% | Holyoke | Massachusetts |

Also of note, according to On the Media from National Public Radio, around 15 to 20 percent of Springfield Ohio is Haitian as of early September of 2026.

== Haitian Americans in politics ==
In the 18th century, Jean-Baptiste Point du Sable was regarded as the first permanent resident and founder of Chicago, Illinois. He was a well-known fur trader who was believed to have been born in Saint-Marc, Haiti (then Saint-Domingue), and who would go on to establish a successful trading post at the mouth of the Chicago River.

In 1871, Josiah T. Walls, who was born in Florida to a Haitian father and African-American mother, became one of the first Haitian-Americans to be elected to the United States Congress, representing Florida. He was a prominent figure during the Reconstruction era and was known for his efforts in his education career in the latter years of his life.

In 2005, Pierre-Richard Prosper served as the U.S. Ambassador-at-Large for War Crimes Issues under President George W. Bush.

In 2007, Mathieu Eugene became the first Haitian-born city councilman to be elected to the New York City Council. He was re-elected in 2009, 2013, and 2017.

In 1999, Marie St. Fleur was elected to the Massachusetts House of Representatives. She later served as Secretary of the Executive Office of Health and Human Services in Massachusetts. She is the first Haitian-American to hold public office in Massachusetts.

In 2010, Jean Monestime was elected as a Miami-Dade County Commissioner. He also served as chairman of the Miami-Dade County Commission.

In 2012, Michaelle Solages was elected as a member of the New York State Assembly, representing the 22nd District. She is the first person of Haitian descent to be elected to the New York State Assembly.

In 2014, Congresswoman Mia Love became the first Haitian American to be elected to the House of Representatives as well as the first Black female Republican. She had previously served as mayor of Saratoga Springs, Utah.

In 2014, Assemblymember Rodneyse Bichotte became the first Haitian-American woman to hold an elected office in New York City when she won the 42nd Assembly District seat. On January 20, 2020, Bichotte was overwhelmingly elected chair of the Kings County Democratic Party, thus becoming the first woman to lead the Brooklyn Democratic Party and the first black woman to lead in any of the five boroughs of New York City locally.

In 2019, Farah N. Louis joined the ranks of Haitian-American legislators in New York City when she became the first woman to represent the 45th Council District, which includes Flatbush, East Flatbush, Midwood, Marine Park, Flatlands, and Kensington in Brooklyn, New York.

In 2022, Sheila Cherfilus-McCormick became the first Haitian-American woman to be elected to the House of Representatives representing Florida.

== Court cases ==
The Jean v. Nelson case began in the early 1980s, when the dictatorship of Jean-Claude Duvalier caused chaos in politics, violations of human rights, and economic problems that forced thousands of Haitians to flee their homeland. In an effort to find safety and opportunity, many Haitians applied for asylum in the US. The primary concern in "Jean v. Nelson" concerned the U.S. government's practice of holding Haitian asylum seekers without providing them with parole or release from custody, in contrast to those seeking asylum elsewhere. The court ruled that Haitian asylum seekers should not have been treated differently, as this was unjustifiable and went against their rights under the equal protection guarantee of the Fifth Amendment.

The primary issue under consideration in St. Fort v. Ashcroft concerned the internment of Haitian refugees who were applying for asylum in the United States. The U.S. government's practice of holding Haitian asylum seekers without offering them personalized bond hearings was contested in the case. International standards pertaining to the treatment of asylum seekers were allegedly breached by the plaintiffs, together with their constitutional rights to due process and equal protection under the law. They claimed the government was illegally keeping them in custody longer than necessary and preventing them from having a fair chance to request their release by refusing to hold bail hearings. This settlement was a major victory for Haitian immigrants and demonstrated how crucial it is to protect their rights within the U.S. immigration system.

== See also ==
- Haiti–United States relations
- Haitian Canadians
- Haitian diaspora
- Haitians
- Afro-Haitians
- Little Haiti
- Newkirk Avenue–Little Haiti station in Brooklyn, NY
- Little Haiti in East Flatbush, Brooklyn
- French Caribbean
- African Americans
- Americans in Haiti
- Colonial-era Haitians
- West Indian Americans
- Dominican Americans
- History of the Haitians in Salisbury, Maryland
