= 1920s Florida land boom =

Florida's first real estate bubble

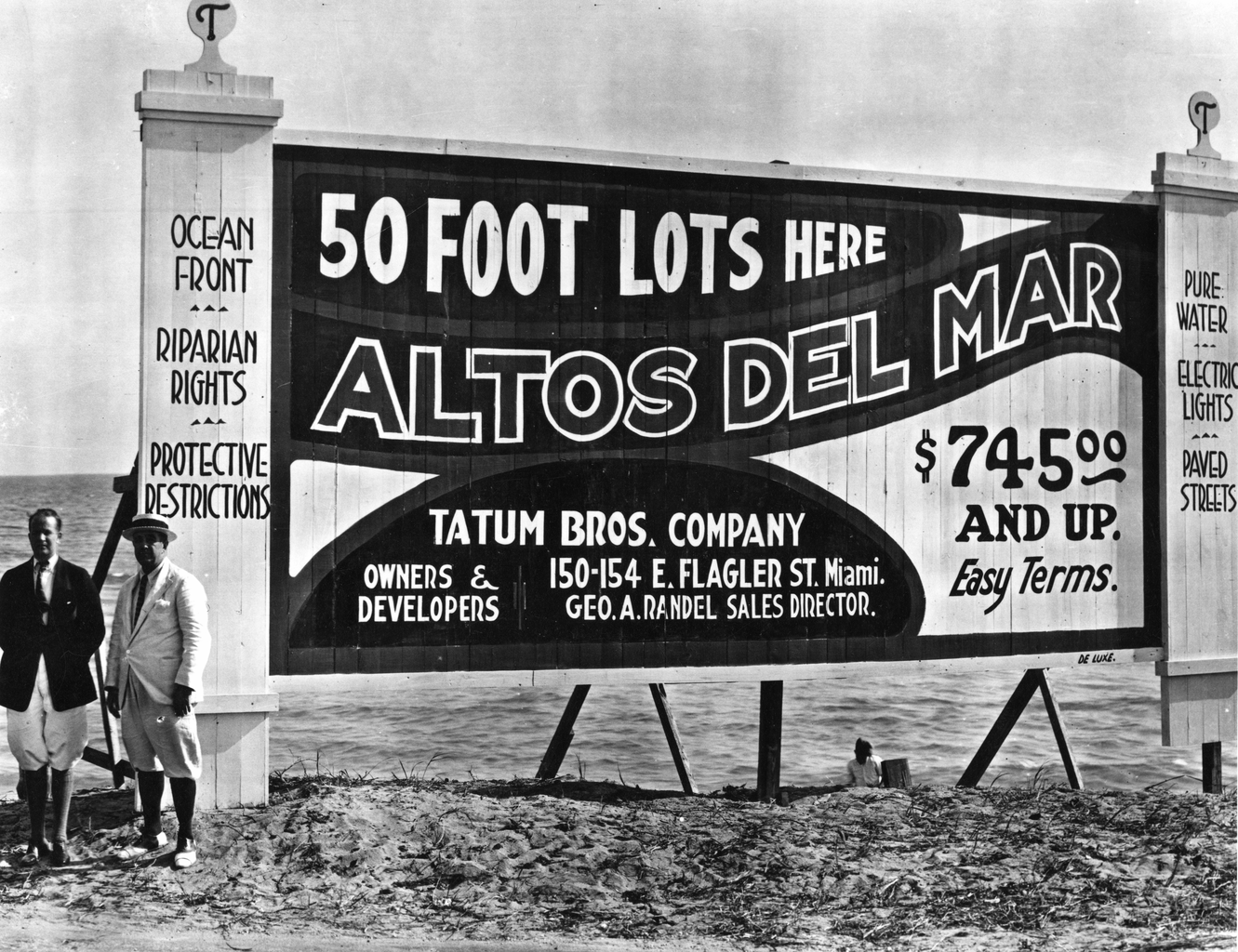
1922 Florida billboard promoting the sale of lots

The first real estate bubble in Florida was primarily driven by the 1920s economic prosperity, coupled with a lack of understanding of storm frequency and poor building standards.

This pioneering era of Florida land speculation lasted from 1924 to 1926 and attracted investors from all over the nation. The land boom left behind entirely new, planned developments incorporated into towns and cities. Major investors and speculators such as Carl G. Fisher also left behind a new history of racially deed restricted properties that segregated cities for decades.

Among those cities at the center of this bubble were Miami Beach, Coral Gables, Hialeah, Miami Springs, Opa-locka, Miami Shores, and Hollywood. It also left behind the remains of failed development projects such as Aladdin City, Boca Raton (original plan), Chevelier, Fulford-by-the-Sea, Interocean City, Isola di Lolando, Okeelanta, Palm Beach Ocean, Poinciana, and Sun City. The land boom shaped Florida's future for decades and created entire new cities out of the Everglades land that remain today.

The story has many parallels to the real estate boom of the 2000s, including the forces of outside speculators, easy credit access for buyers, and rapidly appreciating property values, ending in a financial collapse that ruined thousands of investors and property owners, and crippled the local economy for years thereafter.

== Background and history ==
In the background were the well-publicized extensions of the Florida East Coast Railway, first to West Palm Beach (1894), then Miami (1896), and finally Key West, 1912. The Everglades were being drained, creating new dry land. Finally, World War I cut off the rich from their seasons on the French Riviera, increasing the appeal of parts of the U.S. with a Mediterranean or Tropical climate.

The economic prosperity of the 1920s, coupled with a lack of knowledge about storm frequency and the poor building standards used by boom developers, set the conditions for the first real estate bubble in Florida. Miami had an image as a tropical paradise, and outside investors across the United States began taking an interest in Miami real estate. In part due to publicity stunts and deed restrictions, developers saw a large influx of Northern tourists and potential residents. Developer Carl G. Fisher of Indiana became famous by purchasing a huge lighted billboard in New York's Times Square proclaiming "It's June In Miami". Fisher's publicity and investments, along with those of concurrent pioneers Lummus and Collins, correlated with rapidly rising prices, and the boom began. Brokers and dealers also speculated wildly on commodities. They ordered supplies in excess of what was actually needed and sent shipments to general destinations. As a result, railroad freight cars became stranded, choking rail traffic statewide.

The impact of the boom would extend beyond Miami and southern Florida. Tampa saw growth during this period as well, but had a more diversified economy than Miami, which included manufacturing and tourism. Miami's economy was primarily based on tourism, despite failed attempts during the 1920s to diversify the city's economy. Jacksonville, the largest city in Florida, would not be as affected by the boom because municipal leaders had decided to work on expanding industry and commerce rather than tourism after World War I.

By January 1925, investors were beginning to read negative press about Florida investments. Forbes magazine warned that Florida land prices were based solely upon the expectation of finding a customer, not upon any real land value. The Bureau of Internal Revenue began to scrutinize the Florida real estate boom as a giant sham operation. Speculators intent on flipping properties for huge profits began to have difficulty finding new buyers. To make matters worse, in October 1925, the "Big Three" railroad companies operating in Florida—the Seaboard Air Line Railway, the Florida East Coast Railway, and the Atlantic Coast Line Railroad—called an embargo due to the rail traffic gridlock of building materials, permitting only foodstuffs, fuel, perishables, and essential commodities to enter or move within the state. Also in 1925, Florida began to pass laws further regulating real estate; with salesmen being required to have licenses and offices which as a result led to a boom in demand for office space.

On January 10, 1926, the Prinz Valdemar, a 241-foot, steel-hulled schooner, sank in the mouth of the turning basin of Miami harbor and blocked access to the harbor. It had been on its way to becoming a floating hotel.

Because the railroads were still embargoing non-essential shipments, it became completely impossible to bring building supplies into the Miami area, and the city's image as a tropical paradise began to crumble. In his book Miami Millions, Kenneth Ballinger wrote that the Prinz Valdemar capsize incident saved many people from huge possible losses by revealing cracks in the Miami façade. "In the enforced lull which accompanied the efforts to unstopper the Miami Harbor," he wrote, "many a shipper in the North and many a builder in the South got a better grasp of what was actually taking place here." New buyers failed to arrive, and the property price escalation that fueled the land boom stopped. The days of Miami properties being bought and sold at auction as many as ten times in one day were over.

=== End of the boom ===
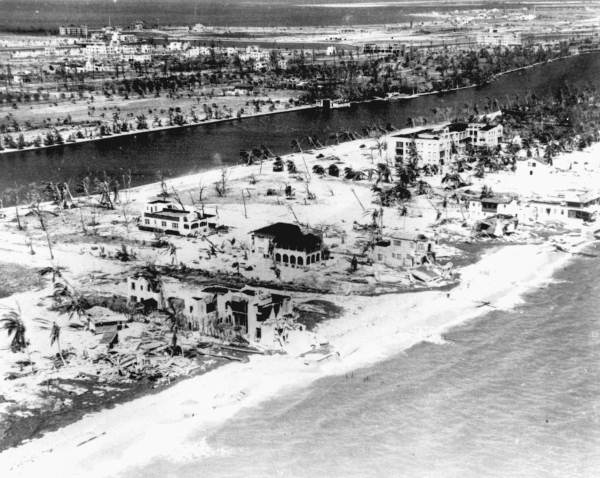
Devastation after the Miami hurricane of 1926

Although the railroads lifted the embargo in May 1926, the boom was about to end. The 1926 Miami hurricane ended the boom and the much smaller 1928 Okeechobee hurricane made certain it was extinguished. The 1926 hurricane destroyed "whatever public enthusiasm for Florida vacation properties and real estate development that remained," as there had been little preparation for the storm.

Florida's economic decline predated the start of the Great Depression. Therefore, it had fewer resources and more debt than other regions of the nation. Large amounts of local debt financing through bonds worsened the state's economic situation, most of it stemming from the years of the land boom. During the land boom, many local governments sold bonds to finance development-related projects. After the boom, the local government did not have revenue proceeds to pay down bond debt. This resulted in widespread unsecured bond default. Another contributing factor was that numerous counties in southern Florida took out large loans during the boom to help fund infrastructure projects to entice developers, leading these counties into debt. Doyle Carlton was elected in 1928 as governor and during his tenure he tried to put a limit on the amount of bonded debt local governments could hold. He faced opposition from state representatives in northern Florida whose counties had less debt and did not want to pay for their southern counterparts.

Deposits in Florida banks had increased steadily between 1922 and 1925, but then started to decline; by 1926 smaller banks began to fail because of many withdrawals by depositors and defaults on loans. Bank assets flowing into the state started to reverse. A "surplus of funds" and easily available credit also began to dry up.

=== Murphy deeds ===
The collapse of land values in Florida caused a severe financial crisis for the state government. Land values had dropped nearly to the vanishing point, but the property was subject to property tax assessments far in excess of its current value. Many property owners simply abandoned the property and did not pay the taxes. Under state law, the state could not sell the property for less than its assessed value. To remedy the situation, in 1937, the Florida Legislature passed the Murphy Act. The Act permitted the state to sell tax delinquent property for what could be obtained. Deeds issued to purchasers, colloquially known as “Murphy deeds,” reserved certain rights to the state. Years later, these reservations, in many cases, enabled the state to acquire rights-of-way without paying compensation.

== See also ==
- Draining and development of the Everglades
- The Cocoanuts
