= Aladdin City, Florida =

Aladdin City
- Unincorporated community
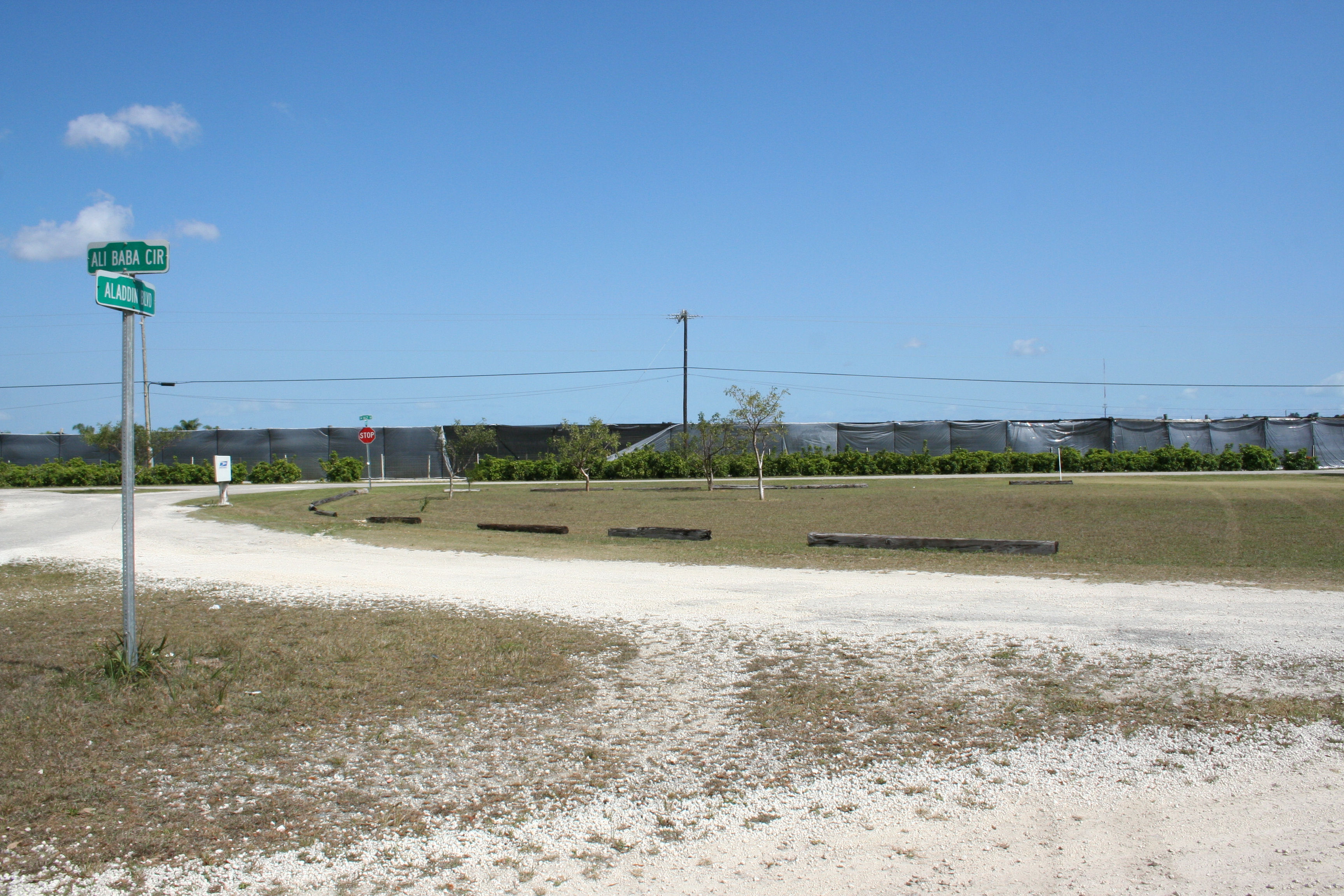
- Last remaining section of Ali Baba Circle at intersection with Aladdin Boulevard, showing upper northwest quadrant of what was to be Ali Baba Park.

- Location within the state of Florida
- Coordinates: 25°34′1.37″N 80°27′13.85″W
- Country: United States
- State: Florida
- County: Miami-Dade
- Elevation: 10 ft (3.0 m)
- Time zone: UTC-5 (Eastern (EST))
  - Summer (DST): UTC-4 (EDT)
- ZIP codes: 33187
- Area codes: 305, 786

Aladdin City is an unincorporated community in Miami-Dade County, Florida, United States. It is located about 20 miles (32 km) southwest of Miami within the unincorporated community of Redland. The site of a Moorish architecture style planned community, development was snuffed out by the abrupt end of the Florida land boom of the 1920s. Opa-locka, Coral Gables, and Miami Springs, Florida were also themed developments.

== History ==
=== Development ===
In late 1925, The Aladdin Company of Bay City, Michigan, a pioneer in the manufacture of mail-order "kit" homes, purchased a large parcel of land in the Redland area. Otto and William Sovereign, the founders of the company, began to build a Moorish-themed city made up primarily of buildings featured in their 1920 industrial catalog. It was planned to have a population of 10,000.

After forming the Aladdin City Sales Co. in December 1925, the Sovereign brothers promoted the building of a "dawn-to-dusk" house on opening day on January 14, 1926, flying in all of the materials on six chartered aircraft from Fort Lauderdale on that single day. The Homestead Leader reported that hundreds of spectators gathered to watch the aircraft shuttle in the materials and to watch the crew of 21 carpenters, plasters, electricians, plumbers, and cement workers put up the house. Construction of the house commenced at 7:00 a.m., and was finished at dark, complete with electricity, plumbing, sidewalks, and landscaping. A few days later, an advertisement in the Miami News boasted that 874 homesites had been sold on opening day.

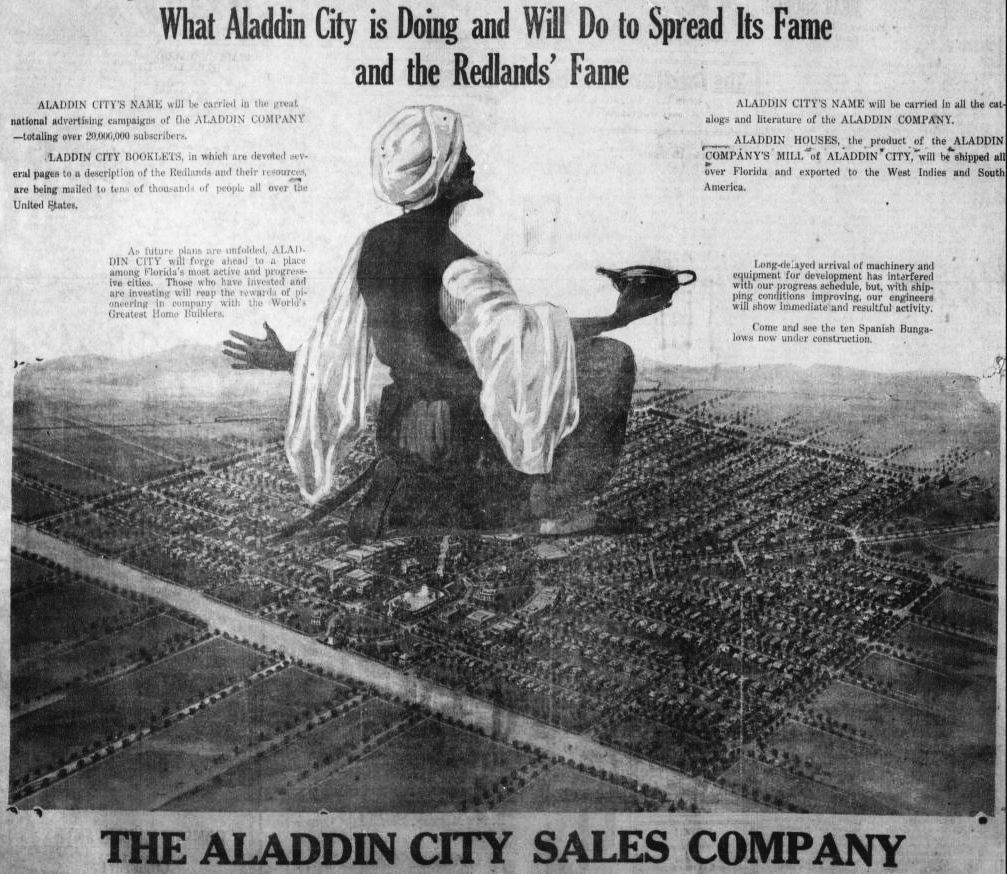
Homestead Leader advertisement showing layout of planned city

Already operating five house manufacturing plants in the United States and Canada, the Aladdin Company announced plans to open a sixth plant in Aladdin City to provide an instant industrial base. The Sovereigns also sought to attract other manufacturing plants to the city. In addition, the Seaboard Air Line Railway, which was constructing its new extension from central Florida to Homestead, planned to maintain a train station in the new city.

Despite sales moving forward, the development encountered logistical problems brought on by the railroad companies' October 1925 embargo on Florida of all but foodstuffs and other essentials, followed by the January 1926 sinking of the Prinz Valdemar in Miami Harbor, which blocked access to the sea. Although these events turned out in retrospect to be the first sign of the end of the land boom, the Sovereign brothers remained optimistic. In a full-page February 1926 advertisement in the Homestead Leader, the Aladdin Company announced: "Long-delayed arrival of machinery and equipment for development has interfered with our progress schedule, but, with shipping conditions improving, our engineers will show immediate and resultful activity."

On February 22, 1926, the development was incorporated as the ninth community in the Redland district by the directors of the Redland District Chamber of Commerce, which sought to take advantage of the thousands of dollars Aladdin was spending to promote the community. On Sunday, March 14, 1926, in a ceremony led by the Sovereign brothers and other officials of the Aladdin City Sales Co., the cornerstone of a one-story bank building "of Persian design" was laid at the corner of Ali Baba Circle and West Cairo Street. Negotiations were purported to be under way at that point to start banking operations upon completion of the building. Following the ceremony, the Pioneer Society—which was composed of Aladdin City investors—held a meeting and elected officers.

Subsequent advertisements in March and April 1926 continued to promise improved homesites, business sites, and apartment sites for 25% down, and invited prospective purchasers to visit and see "the beautiful Spanish bungalows already built and under construction" as well as "the road crushers building wonderful 100-foot boulevards; the swift completion of your bathing pool and sunken gardens; beautiful, distinctive Spanish boulevards; business blocks being built; industrial projects taking form—in short, the building of a city complete in itself."

=== Demise ===
Although the railroad companies lifted their embargo in May 1926, the land boom had nevertheless begun to peter out, and the September 1926 Miami Hurricane caused an emphatic collapse in real estate prices. While a number of homes, a town hall, and the promised Seaboard extension and Aladdin City train station were built, the development became dormant. Some promotional activity continued; the Aladdin City Handicap was run at Hialeah Park through 1931. In December 1930, at the onset of the Great Depression, the Sovereign brothers conducted a raffle of two homes and ten lots in a nationwide competition among purchasers of Aladdin kit homes. The winners of the two homes, both of whom were from the northeastern U.S., also received round-trip tickets to Aladdin City. The Sovereign brothers planned a similar raffle for the end of 1931. However, in March 1934, the Sovereigns returned the lots to acreage in a revised plat, and continued to liquidate their already deeply discounted land holdings. The Aladdin City Sales Co. was finally dissolved by proclamation in November 1936.

A couple of the Aladdin homes survived over the years, but without the community and the commercial buildings, which remained on the drawing board. The last of these homes reportedly suffered severe damage in Hurricane Andrew in 1992. The wooden train station—unique among Seaboard stations in South Florida, which were routinely constructed out of stucco or concrete—was reported to be still standing as of 1985, but was apparently torn down after suffering damage from Hurricane Andrew.

== Geography ==
Aladdin City is located at 25.567046°N 80.453846°W, with an elevation 10 feet (3.0 m).

=== Original layout ===
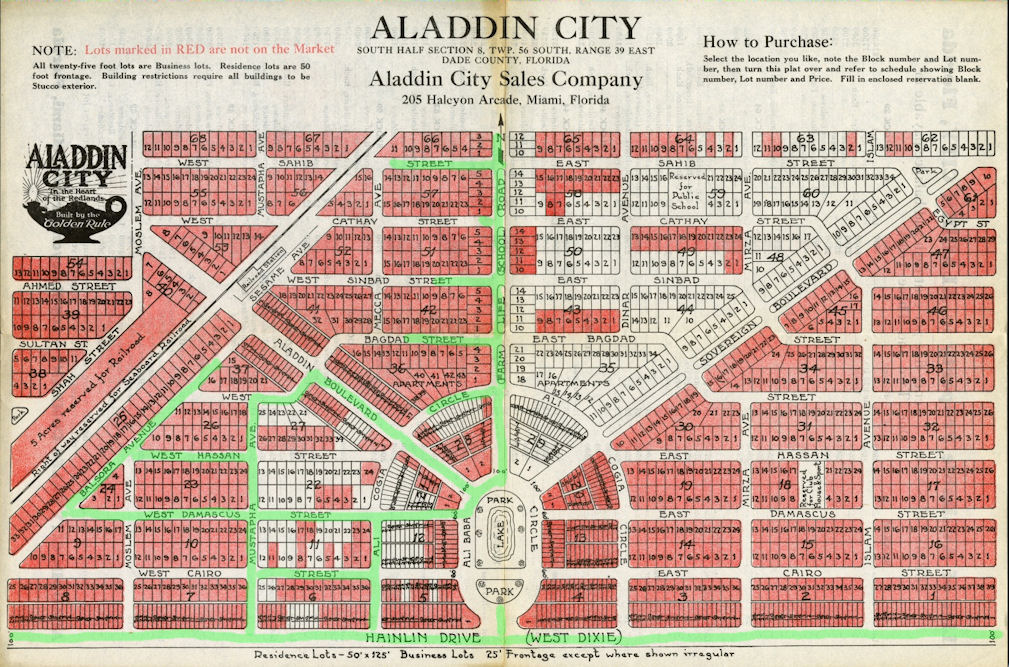
Original lot plan of Aladdin City (originally platted and still existing streets in green)

The original community was centered around a large oval—known as Ali Baba Circle—oriented on a north–south axis. The interior of the oval was planned as Ali Baba Park, with a large bathing pool in the middle. The top half of an even larger oval, Ali Cogia Circle, surrounded Ali Baba Circle. Both circles were planned as the site of the city's commercial district. The southern tip of Ali Baba Circle led onto Hainlin Mill Drive, while Farm Life School Road (SW 162nd Avenue) extended from the northern tip and also continued south from the intersection of Ali Baba Circle and Hainlin Mill Drive.

Two hundred-foot-wide boulevards, Sovereign Boulevard (the only street without a Moorish name) and Aladdin Boulevard, radiated from the northeastern and northwestern curves of Ali Baba Circle. Damascus Street and Cairo Street extended from the east and west sides of the circle, with Cairo Street bisecting Ali Baba Circle south of the bathing pool site. Hassan Street extended west from the intersection of Aladdin Boulevard and Ali Cogia Circle West and east from the intersection of Sovereign Boulevard and Ali Cogia Circle East. Running in a north–south direction west of Ali Cogia Circle was Mustapha Avenue, which ended at Aladdin Boulevard. North of Ali Cogia Circle ran Bagdad, Sinbad, Cathay, and Sahib Streets in an east–west direction. Running parallel to Farm Life School Road at the other end of these streets was Mecca Avenue.

=== Present day ===
Only the northwestern curve of Ali Baba Circle remains today—together with Aladdin Boulevard radiating to the northwest—as do two portions of the western arc of Ali Cogia Circle. Portions of the western halves of Damascus and Cairo Streets (now known, respectively, as SW 214th and 215th Streets) also remain. Mustapha Avenue now exists as SW 164th Avenue. North of Ali Cogia Circle, Bagdad Street remains as originally named, while the names of Sinbad, Cathay, and Sahib Streets have been changed to, respectively, SW 210th, 209th, and 208th Terraces, and are generally used as private drives today. Mecca Avenue was renamed SW 163rd Avenue. That half of the planned city east of Ali Baba Circle has long since reverted to agricultural use, and there are no traces of its original street layout.

== Sources ==
- Original 1925 plat of western half of Aladdin City
- March 1934 revised plat of Aladdin City returning lots in western half to acreage
- History of Aladdin City and the homes sold

== Other external links ==
- Google Maps satellite view
- Film with footage of Aladdin City construction
