= Larry Kahn (tiddlywinks) =

American tiddlywinks player

Lawrence Kahn (born 1953 or 1954) is an American tiddlywinks player. He has held numerous records in tiddlywinks over his playing career, and is the current player with the most championship wins.

== Biography ==
Larry Kahn grew up in North Miami Beach, Florida. He attended Massachusetts Institute of Technology (MIT), where he graduated with a bachelor's degree in ocean engineering in 1975. He would later receive a master's degree in the same field in 1976.

In 1984, he was an ocean engineer with Washington Analytical Services in Rockville, Maryland. As of 2016, he worked with the National Institutes of Health, advising them on IT acquisitions.

== Tiddlywinks ==
Kahn first heard about the game tiddlywinks in 1971 from an MIT handbook sent to incoming students. By 1989, he was the vice president of the North American Tiddlywinks Association and additionally operated a tiddlywinks parlor in Maryland. In the game, he has gone by the nickname "Horsemeat" and "King".

As of 2016, Kahn had won over 100 tiddlywinks championships and held the Guinness World Record for most victories at the English National Championships (eight). As of 2013, he also held the Guinness World Records for "Most Tiddlywinks World Championships" with 21, and "Most Tiddlywinks World Championships (pairs)" with 16. Since that date, he has won another three singles and another four pairs titles. Additionally, he was the only player to have held all six of the game's major titles simultaneously (in April 1995). He has won six international titles competing as a duo with Dave Lockwood, and eight with Matt Fayers.

Lockwood and Kahn frequently compete against each other, with Sports Illustrated once comparing their rivalry to that of Muhammad Ali and Joe Frazier. Since the mid-1990s, Kahn has had a World Championship rivalry with English-player Patrick Barrie, with the pair contesting 16 matches up to the end of 2019.

=== Performance timelines ===
Key
W	2^{nd}	SF	3^{rd}-4^{th}	QF	5^{th}-8^{th}	2R	1R	TP	U	IN	A

(W) winner; (SF) semifinalist; (QF) quarterfinalist; (#R) rounds 2, 1; (TP) 'took part', i.e. non-placing in single stage tournament; (U) 'unknown', i.e. took part but ranking not recorded; (IN) took part but ineligible for ranking; (A) absent; (SR) strike rate (events won / competed); (W–D-L) win–draw-loss record

==== Major open tournaments ====
Tournament	1972	1973	1974	1975	1976	1977	1978	1979	1980	1981	1982	1983	1984	1985	1986	1987	1988	SR	Win %
ETwA National Singles	A	A	A	A	A	A	A	A	A	A	A	A	W	W	2^{nd}	W	2^{nd}	—	—
ETwA National Pairs	A	A	A	A	A	A	A	A	A	A	A	A	A	A	A	A	A	—	—
NATwA Singles	A	A	IN	A	IN	1R	3^{rd}	4^{th}	2^{nd}	W	W	3^{rd}	2^{nd}	W	—	W	W	—	—
NATwA Pairs	IN	5^{th}	4^{th}	3^{rd}	W	W	W	3^{rd}	W	W	3^{rd}	W	W	W	—	W	2^{nd}	—	—
Tournament	1989	1990	1991	1992	1993	1994	1995	1996	1997	1998	1999	2000	2001	2002	2003	2004	2005	SR	Win %
ETwA National Singles	W	2^{nd}	2^{nd}	2^{nd}	3^{rd}	W	2^{nd}	2R	4^{th}	W	W	3^{rd}	4^{th}	3^{rd}	2^{nd}	5^{th}	4^{th}	—	—
ETwA National Pairs	W	3^{rd}	A	A	A	W	W	2^{nd}	A	A	A	A	A	W	W	2^{nd}	W	—	—
NATwA Singles	W	2^{nd}	W	2^{nd}	4^{th}	W	2^{nd}	W	W	W	W	W	2^{nd}	W	W	W	W	—	—
NATwA Pairs	2^{nd}	W	2^{nd}	W	W	W	2^{nd}	W	—	2^{nd}	A	W	3^{rd}	2^{nd}	A	W	2^{nd}	—	—
Tournament	2006	2007	2008	2009	2010	2011	2012	2013	2014	2015	2016	2017	2018	2019	2020	2021	2022	SR	Win %
ETwA National Singles	2^{nd}	2^{nd}	6^{th}	A	W	8^{th}	2^{nd}	2^{nd}	—	3^{rd}	W	2^{nd}	A	4^{th}	—	—	3^{rd}	9 / 34	80%
ETwA National Pairs	W	3^{rd}	A	A	A	2^{nd}	W	3^{rd}	A/A	2^{nd}	A	A	A	W	—	—	A	9 / 16	80%
NATwA Singles	W	W	W	W	W	W	W	W	W	W	W	W	W	W	—	—	—	31 / 44	79%
NATwA Pairs	W	A	W	W	3^{rd}	W	W	W	W	3^{rd}	2^{nd}	W	W	W	—	—	A	26 / 43	77%

==== World champion ====
Singles:

- 1983-1985 (5 challenges)
- 1985-1986 (1 challenge)
- 1988-1990 (4 challenges)
- 1990-1992 (2 challenges)
- 1995 (2 challenges)
- 1997-1998 (2 challenges)
- 1999-2001 (2 challenges)
- 2003-2004 (1 challenge)
- 2010-2013 (3 challenges)
- 2015-2017 (2 challenges)

Pairs:

- 1978-1983 (2 challenges)
- 1984-1985 (2 challenges)
- 1989 (1 challenge)
- 1995-1998 (5 challenges)
- 2007-2013 (8 challenges)
- 2019 (1 challenge)
- 2022 (1 challenge)

Note: Tiddlywinks world titles are played for on a challenge basis, with the title holder(s) being challenged by a qualifying player or pair of players. The number of challenges displayed is the number of successful matches in which the title was won or defended.
