= North Miami Beach, Florida =

- City
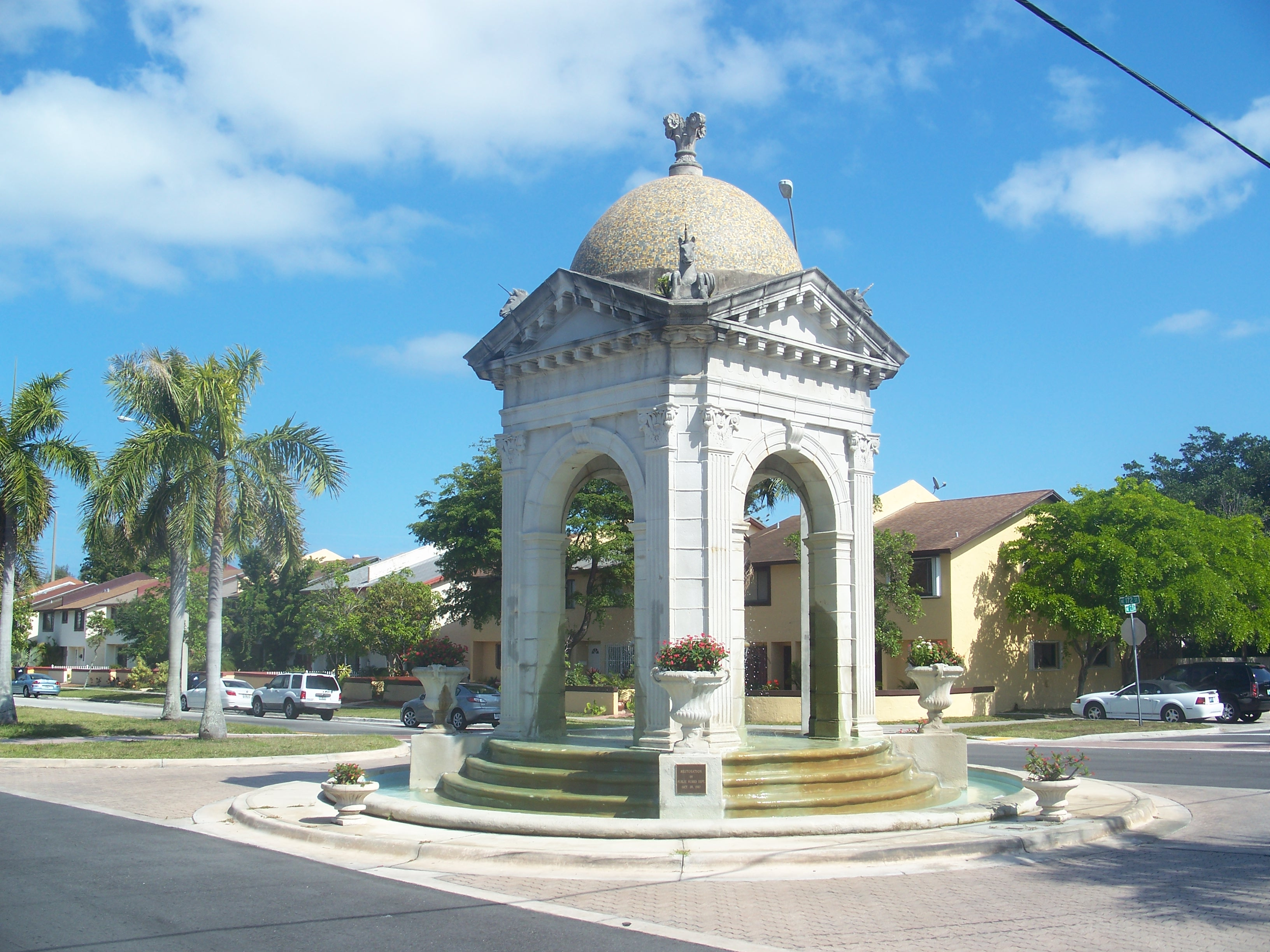
- North Miami Beach in April 2011

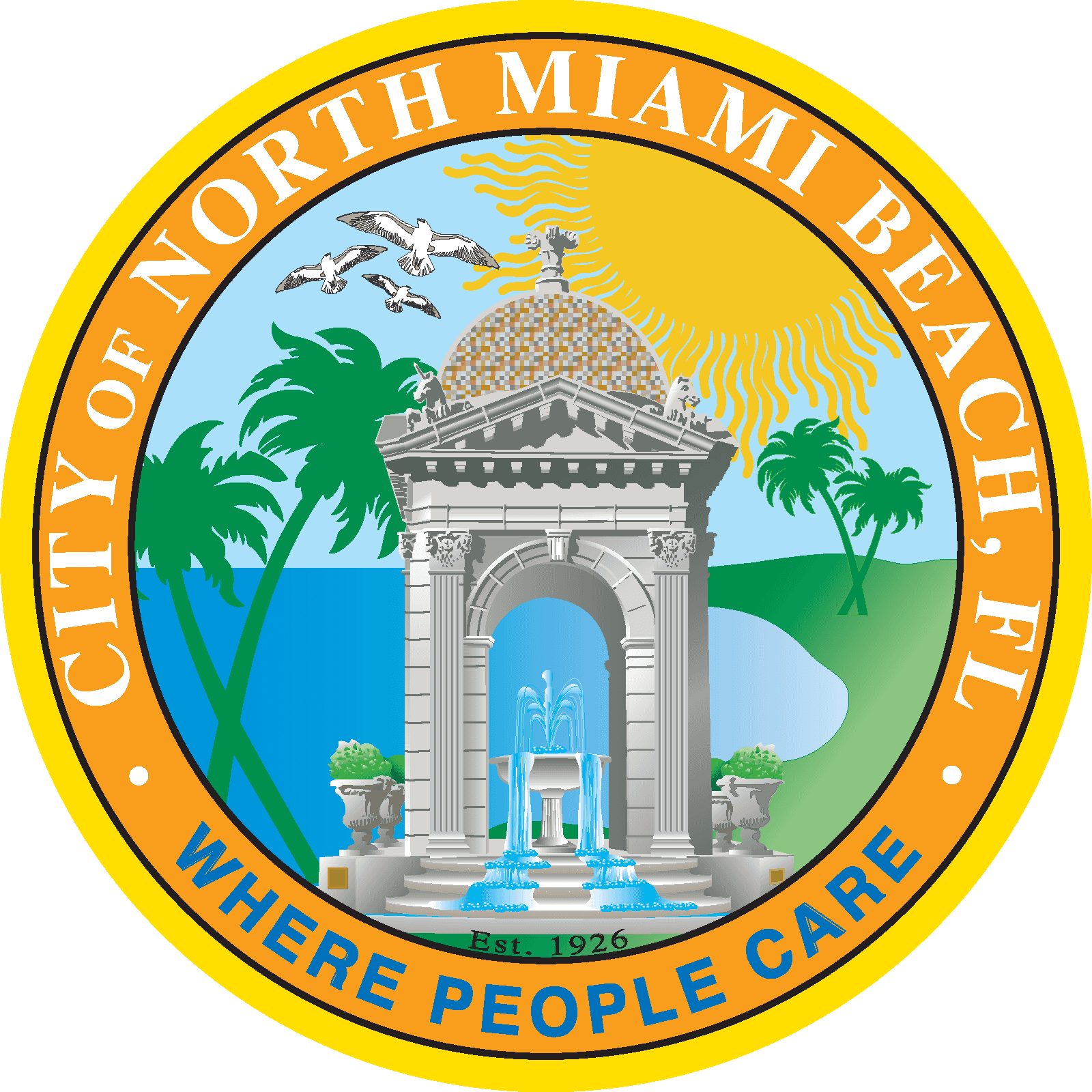
- Flag Seal
- Nicknames: NMB
- Motto: "Where People Care"
- Location in Miami-Dade County and the state of Florida

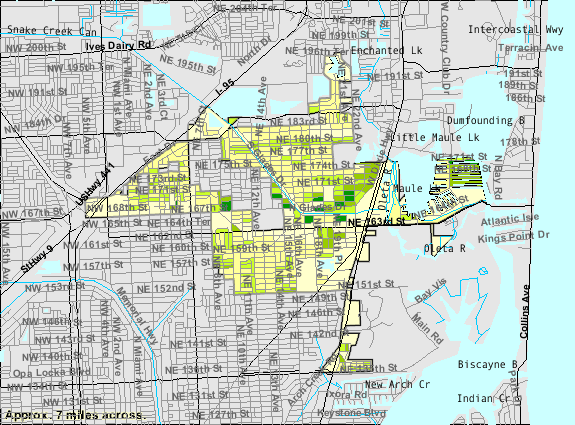
- U.S. Census Bureau map showing city limits
- Coordinates: 25°55′49″N 80°09′57″W
- Country: United States
- State: Florida
- County: Miami-Dade
- Settled (Fulford-By-The-Sea): 1881
- Incorporated (Town of Fulford): 1926
- Incorporated (City of Fulford): 1927
- Incorporated (City of North Miami Beach): June 15, 1931

Government
  - Type: Commission-Manager
  - Mayor: Michael Joseph
  - Vice Mayor: Phyllis Smith
  - Commissioners: Daniela Jean, Fortuna Smukler, McKenzie Fleurimond, Jay R. Chernoff, and Lynn Su
  - City Manager: Darvin Williams
  - City Clerk: Andrise Bernard

Area
  - Total: 5.37 sq mi (13.91 km^{2})
  - Land: 4.85 sq mi (12.55 km^{2})
  - Water: 0.53 sq mi (1.36 km^{2}) 6.43%
- Elevation: 10 ft (3.0 m)

Population (2020)
  - Total: 43,676
  - Density: 9,016.2/sq mi (3,481.18/km^{2})
- Time zone: UTC-5 (EST)
  - Summer (DST): UTC-4 (EDT)
- ZIP Codes: 33160, 33162, 33169, 33179, 33181
- Area codes: 305, 786, 645
- FIPS code: 12-49475
- GNIS feature ID: 2404395
- Website: www.citynmb.com

North Miami Beach (commonly referred to as NMB) is a city in Miami-Dade County, Florida, United States. The City of North Miami Beach is part of the Miami metropolitan area of South Florida. Originally named "Fulford-by-the-Sea" in 1926, after Captain William H. Fulford of the U.S. Coast Guard, the city was renamed "North Miami Beach" in 1931. The population was 43,676 at the 2020 US census.

== History ==
The first non-indigenous settlement was platted in 1881, and was called Fulford-By-The-Sea.

In the 1920s, Carl G. Fisher built an all-wooden racetrack with stands for 12,000 spectators, known as the Fulford–Miami Speedway. This event, held on February 22, 1926, dubbed the Carl G. Fisher Cup Race, was a forerunner to the auto races at Sebring and Daytona. In September 1926, after just one race, the track was destroyed by the 1926 Miami hurricane.

The hurricane of 1926 essentially ended the South Florida real estate boom, and in an effort to alleviate their losses and the damage to the city, local residents came together as the Town of Fulford. In 1927, it was incorporated as the City of Fulford.

== Geography ==
The City of North Miami Beach is bordered to the southeast by the city of North Miami, to the southwest by unincorporated Golden Glades, to the west by the city of Miami Gardens, to the north by unincorporated Ojus, to the northeast by the city of Aventura, and to the east across the Intracoastal Waterway by the city of Sunny Isles Beach.

U.S. Route 1 (Biscayne Boulevard) runs through the east side of the city, leading south 11 miles (18 km) to downtown Miami and north 14 miles (23 km) to Fort Lauderdale. Interstate 95 runs along the northwest border of the city, with access from Exit 12.

According to the United States Census Bureau, the city has a total area of 5.37 square miles (13.9 km^{2}). 4.4 square miles (11 km^{2}) of it are land and 0.53 square miles (1.4 km^{2}) of it (9.78%) are water.

Although the North Miami Beach boundaries once stretched to the Atlantic Ocean, the city no longer has any beaches within its limits. They are now a short distance away, within the city of Sunny Isles Beach across the Intracoastal Waterway.

=== Climate ===
North Miami Beach has a tropical climate, similar to the climate found in much of the Caribbean. It is part of the only region in the 48 contiguous states that falls under that category. More specifically, it generally has a tropical rainforest climate (Köppen climate classification: Af), bordering a tropical monsoon climate (Köppen climate classification: Am).

Climate data for North Miami Beach, Florida, 1991–2020 normals, extremes 2000–present
Month	Jan	Feb	Mar	Apr	May	Jun	Jul	Aug	Sep	Oct	Nov	Dec	Year
Record high °F (°C)	86 (30)	88 (31)	92 (33)	94 (34)	95 (35)	98 (37)	98 (37)	97 (36)	95 (35)	94 (34)	90 (32)	88 (31)	98 (37)
Mean maximum °F (°C)	83.2 (28.4)	85.3 (29.6)	87.3 (30.7)	89.5 (31.9)	91.5 (33.1)	93.8 (34.3)	93.3 (34.1)	93.5 (34.2)	92.6 (33.7)	90.8 (32.7)	86.3 (30.2)	84.0 (28.9)	95.1 (35.1)
Mean daily maximum °F (°C)	75.2 (24.0)	77.0 (25.0)	79.1 (26.2)	82.5 (28.1)	85.4 (29.7)	88.3 (31.3)	89.6 (32.0)	90.0 (32.2)	88.5 (31.4)	85.5 (29.7)	80.5 (26.9)	77.3 (25.2)	83.3 (28.5)
Daily mean °F (°C)	67.1 (19.5)	69.0 (20.6)	71.3 (21.8)	75.2 (24.0)	78.5 (25.8)	81.5 (27.5)	82.7 (28.2)	83.1 (28.4)	82.0 (27.8)	79.0 (26.1)	73.4 (23.0)	69.7 (20.9)	76.0 (24.4)
Mean daily minimum °F (°C)	59.0 (15.0)	61.0 (16.1)	63.6 (17.6)	67.9 (19.9)	71.7 (22.1)	74.7 (23.7)	75.8 (24.3)	76.2 (24.6)	75.4 (24.1)	72.5 (22.5)	66.3 (19.1)	62.2 (16.8)	68.8 (20.4)
Mean minimum °F (°C)	43.7 (6.5)	47.1 (8.4)	51.3 (10.7)	58.8 (14.9)	64.3 (17.9)	70.7 (21.5)	71.6 (22.0)	72.5 (22.5)	72.1 (22.3)	63.6 (17.6)	54.3 (12.4)	49.7 (9.8)	41.3 (5.2)
Record low °F (°C)	35 (2)	37 (3)	41 (5)	52 (11)	54 (12)	68 (20)	67 (19)	70 (21)	68 (20)	54 (12)	45 (7)	36 (2)	35 (2)
Average precipitation inches (mm)	2.30 (58)	2.72 (69)	2.67 (68)	3.54 (90)	5.68 (144)	9.03 (229)	8.30 (211)	9.28 (236)	10.26 (261)	7.34 (186)	4.55 (116)	2.66 (68)	68.33 (1,736)
Average precipitation days (≥ 0.01 in)	7.0	6.6	6.2	6.5	10.8	16.5	17.6	17.0	18.0	14.0	9.3	8.2	137.7
Source: NOAA (mean maxima/minima 2006–2020)

=== Surrounding areas ===
Miami Gardens, Ives Estates, Ojus, Aventura
Miami Gardens Sunny Isles Beach
Miami Gardens, Golden Glades Ojus, Aventura, Sunny Isles Beach
Golden Glades North Miami
Golden Glades, North Miami

=== Neighborhoods & Sub-neighborhoods ===
Sources:

- Allen Park
  - Aqua Bowl
  - Corona Del Mar
  - TECO/Peoples Gas
  - West Dixie Industrial
- Highland Village
  - Biscayne North
  - Biscayne South
- City Center
  - Fulford
  - Government Center
  - University Park
- Eastern Shores
  - Western Eastern Shores
- Oakgrove
  - Breeze Swept
  - Carl Byoir
  - Fleeman Heights
- Oleta River State Park
- Pickwick
- Skylake
- Sunray East
- Sunray West
- Uleta
  - I-95 Row
- Washington Park
- Windward
  - Pan Uleta
  - Monticello

== Demographics ==
Historical population
Census	Pop.	Note	%±
1940	871		—
1950	2,129		144.4%
1960	21,405		905.4%
1970	30,544		42.7%
1980	36,553		19.7%
1990	35,359		−3.3%
2000	40,786		15.3%
2010	41,523		1.8%
2020	43,676		5.2%
U.S. Decennial Census

=== Racial and ethnic composition ===
North Miami Beach city, Florida – Racial and ethnic composition Note: the US Census treats Hispanic/Latino as an ethnic category. This table excludes Latinos from the racial categories and assigns them to a separate category. Hispanics/Latinos may be of any race.
Race / Ethnicity (NH = Non-Hispanic)	Pop 2000	Pop 2010	Pop 2020	% 2000	% 2010	% 2020
White alone (NH)	10,104	7,630	7,621	24.77%	18.38%	17.45%
Black or African American alone (NH)	15,273	16,251	14,464	37.45%	39.14%	33.12%
Native American or Alaska Native alone (NH)	66	58	46	0.16%	0.14%	0.11%
Asian alone (NH)	1,615	1,373	1,491	3.96%	3.31%	3.41%
Pacific Islander or Native Hawaiian alone (NH)	25	16	4	0.06%	0.04%	0.01%
Other race alone (NH)	141	172	366	0.35%	0.41%	0.84%
Mixed race or Multiracial (NH)	1,317	810	1,161	3.23%	1.95%	2.66%
Hispanic or Latino (any race)	12,245	15,213	18,523	30.02%	36.64%	42.41%
Total	40,786	41,523	43,676	100.00%	100.00%	100.00%

=== 2020 census ===
As of the 2020 census, North Miami Beach had a population of 43,676. The median age was 39.8 years. 20.0% of residents were under the age of 18 and 15.9% of residents were 65 years of age or older. For every 100 females there were 94.1 males, and for every 100 females age 18 and over there were 92.1 males age 18 and over.

100.0% of residents lived in urban areas, while 0.0% lived in rural areas.

There were 15,521 households in North Miami Beach, of which 33.0% had children under the age of 18 living in them. Of all households, 40.5% were married-couple households, 21.4% were households with a male householder and no spouse or partner present, and 31.9% were households with a female householder and no spouse or partner present. About 24.3% of all households were made up of individuals and 8.8% had someone living alone who was 65 years of age or older.

There were 17,126 housing units, of which 9.4% were vacant. The homeowner vacancy rate was 2.1% and the rental vacancy rate was 5.8%.

Racial composition as of the 2020 census
Race	Number	Percent
White	11,430	26.2%
Black or African American	14,898	34.1%
American Indian and Alaska Native	232	0.5%
Asian	1,530	3.5%
Native Hawaiian and Other Pacific Islander	16	0.0%
Some other race	4,814	11.0%
Two or more races	10,756	24.6%
Hispanic or Latino (of any race)	18,523	42.4%

=== 2010 census ===
As of the 2010 U.S. census, there were 41,523 people, 13,681 households, and 9,462 families residing in the city.

=== 2000 census ===
As of 2000, 37.6% had children under the age of 18 living with them. 44.3% were married couples living together, 19.5% had a female householder with no husband present, and 29.9% were non-families. 23.9% of all households were made up of individuals, and 8.6% had someone living alone who was 65 years of age or older. The average household size was 2.89 and the average family size was 3.44.

As of the census of 2000, there were 40,786 people, 13,987 households, and 9,804 families residing in the city. The population density was 3,174.9 inhabitants per square kilometre (8,223/sq mi). There were 15,350 housing units at an average density of 1,194.9 per square kilometre (3,095/sq mi). The racial makeup of the city was 46.68% White (24.8% were Non-Hispanic White), 38.97% African American, 0.29% Native American, 4.04% Asian, 0.07% Pacific Islander, 4.61% from other races, and 5.34% from two or more races. Hispanic or Latino of any race were 30.02% of the population.

As of 2000, there were 13,987 households out of which 37.6% had children under the age of 18 living with them, 44.3% were married couples living together, 19.5% had a female householder with no husband present, and 29.9% were non-families. 23.9% of all households were made up of individuals and 8.6% had someone living alone who was 65 years of age or older. The average household size was 2.89 and the average family size was 3.44.

In 2000, the city the population was spread out with 27.3% under the age of 18, 9.4% from 18 to 24, 30.9% from 25 to 44, 21.1% from 45 to 64, and 11.3% who were 65 years of age or older. The median age was 34 years. For every 100 females there were 91.6 males. For every 100 females age 18 and over, there were 86.3 males.

In 2000, the median income for a household in the city was $31,377, and the median income for a family was $35,047. Males had a median income of $26,278 versus $22,110 for females. The per capita income for the city was $14,699. About 18.4% of families and 20.5% of the population were below the poverty line, including 25.1% of those under age 18 and 18.2% of those age 65 or over.

As of 2000, English was the first language for 38.50% of all residents, while Spanish accounted for 31.97%, French Creole 19.32%, French 2.33%, Chinese 1.55%, Portuguese 1.20%, Hebrew 0.87%, Russian 0.65%, Yiddish 0.56%, and Italian 0.52% of the population.

As of 2000, North Miami Beach had the fourth highest percentage of Haitian residents in the US, with 19.9% of the US populace. It had the forty-seventh highest percentage of Colombian residents in the US, at 2.83% of the city's population, and the sixty-seventh highest percentage of Cuban residents in the US, at 4.92% of the city's population. It also had the sixtieth most Dominicans in the US, at 2.39% (tied with Virginia Gardens,) while it had the twenty-ninth highest percentage of Bahamians (tied with Munford, Alabama,) at 1.1% of all residents. North Miami Beach's Jamaican community had the twenty-first highest percentage of residents, which was at 5.5% of all residents. It's also home to the twenty-eighth highest percentage of Peruvian residents in the US, at 1.8% of the population (tied with Richmond West.)

North Miami Beach has a middle class Haitian American, Chinese American, and Jewish American community who were born in the U.S. or abroad.

=== Chinatown ===
Despite Asians making up only 3.41% of North Miami Beach's population as of 2020, the city's main commercial artery along NE 167th street converging into North Miami Beach Boulevard and then becoming 163rd street, has taken the unofficial name of "Chinatown" due to the large concentration of Asian owned and operated businesses in the area. The area has been referred to unofficially as "Chinatown" since the early 1990s by both locals and North Miami Beach city officials. As of late, even Miami-Dade County officials have begun to reference the area as Chinatown. Local guides and Miami websites have called 163rd street Miami's unofficial Chinatown.

== Attractions ==
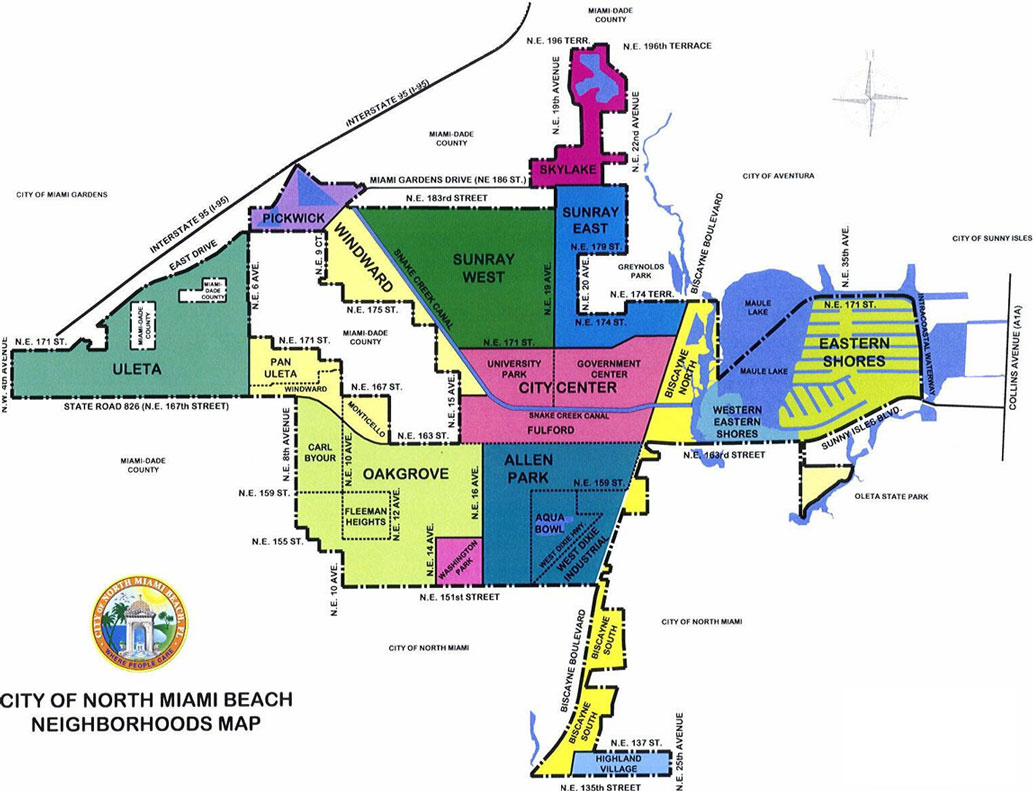
Map of North Miami Beach's neighborhoods

Attractions in the vicinity of North Miami Beach include a line of popular Atlantic Ocean beaches, Ancient Spanish Monastery, Oleta River State Park, Greynolds Park, East Greynolds Park, Fulford-by-the-Sea Monument, and Aventura Mall.

North Miami Beach's has a historic 12th century medieval Spanish monastery, the St. Bernard de Clairvaux Church. This stone building around a patio, the cloisters of the Monastery of St. Bernard de Clairvaux, was built in Sacramenia, Segovia, Spain in the 12th century. It was purchased by William Randolph Hearst in the 1920s, dismantled and shipped to the United States, and reassembled after Hearst's death in North Miami Beach in the 1950s. It is a tourism attraction and a popular spot for weddings.

== Parks and recreation ==
In 1966, a major accomplishment was the completion of the tennis complex and two community centers, Victory Park and Uleta Community Center.

In 1968, the Washington Park Community Center was built, and the Allen Park Youth Center was completed in 1973.

North Miami Beach expanded its parks in the 1980s as a result of the city commission making strides to benefit the community.

The city now has the Judge Arthur I. Snyder Tennis Center. It includes twelve lighted clay Hydrogrid tennis courts, six lighted lay-kold hard tennis courts, four racquetball courts, and two paddleball courts. The center also has a clubhouse and pro-shop, a picnic area, and lounge and shower facilities.

== Government and infrastructure ==
North Miami Beach is governed by a commission-manager system in the form of a Mayor, Commission, and a professional City Manager. In this type of a government, commission members are the leaders and policy makers in the community. This form of government was implemented in 1958, after a new charter was voted on.

The mayor is elected citywide and serves up to two consecutive two-year terms.

There is an elected mayor and six-member city commission, with the city manager, city clerk, and city attorney being appointed positions that are responsible for implementing the policies of the city commission.

The Federal Bureau of Investigation (FBI) Miami field office was previously in North Miami Beach. It moved to Miramar on December 8, 2014.

In 1993, in an effort to promote neighborhood stability throughout the city, North Miami Beach built a state-of-the-art police station and redeveloped infrastructure in the Government Center neighborhood.

The bond program Proud Neighborhoods took place in September 2000 and had 67 different projects. This allowed for the improvement of streets, sidewalks, lighting and landscaping in every neighborhood of the city. It took five years but it brought substantial improvements.

In the wake of the nearby Surfside condominium building collapse on June 24, the city stepped up building inspections and enforcement, and on July 2, condemned a 10-story condominium, Crestview Towers.

== Education ==
=== Primary and secondary schools ===
Miami-Dade County Public Schools serves North Miami Beach.

Public elementary schools

- Fulford Elementary School
- Greynolds Park Elementary School
- Madie Ives Elementary School
- Oak Grove Elementary School
- Ojus Elementary School
- Sabal Palm Elementary

Public middle schools

- Highland Oaks Middle School
- John F. Kennedy Middle School

Public high schools

- Alonzo and Tracy Mourning Senior High Biscayne Bay Campus
- Dr. Michael Krop Senior High School
- North Miami Beach Senior High School

Prior to the opening of North Miami Beach Senior High School (and later, Krop & Mourning Senior High Schools), students residing in North Miami Beach were originally assigned to North Miami Senior High School and later, Miami Norland Senior High School.

Private schools

- Yeshiva Toras Chaim
- Beth Jacob High School
- Allison Academy
- Toras Emes Academy Klurman Elementary School
- Young Leaders Academy K–8
- Fulford Christian Academy

=== Colleges and universities ===
- Nova Southeastern University – North Miami Beach Campus

=== Public libraries ===
North Miami Beach Public Library (NMB Library), also referred to as the Lafe Allen Public Library, is a 23,000 square foot facility located at 1601 NE 164th Street in North Miami Beach, Florida. The library's collection currently contains over 60,000 items, including both fiction and non-fiction materials, DVDs, audio books, compact discs, newspapers, magazines, and foreign language materials. Digital services include access to e-materials and reference resources, such as Florida Electronic Library, Newsbank, Reference USA, World Book, NoveList Plus, and more.

In 1959, the North Miami Beach Library was initially opened inside of a storefront on NE 163rd Street as a branch of the Miami-Dade Public Library System (then known as the City of Miami Library system). This location was relocated and expanded to two storefronts at the corner of NE 19th Avenue and NE 169th Street the following year. In 1961, however, the city ended its attachment with the City of Miami Library system and became an independent library. During this time, the library was merely a staff of two. The staff had a minor budget of 25,000 to build the collection for the library. After residents of the City of North Miami Beach voted to build a permanent location for the library in 1964, a new building was constructed on 164th Street and opened in 1965. Renovations to this facility in 1981 and 1994 grew the branch from its original 10,000 square feet to make room for the library's expanding collection. The last reservation took place in 1994 and granted the facility its current dimensions at over 23,000 square feet.

The NMB Library offers a variety of services to the residents of North Miami Beach, such as access to study and meeting rooms, employment resources, early literacy programs, voter registration forms, citizenship materials, and passport assistance. Computers, printers, copiers, scanners, and fax machine services are also available. The library's dedicated teen area, known as the Discovery District, is a space specifically designed to provide library patrons aged 13–19 with a place to read, study, or work on school projects. Access to computers, 3D printers, virtual reality, and zSpace for educational and recreational purposes is also provided.

== Notable people ==
- Garcelle Beauvais, actress and television personality
- Andrea Bocelli, Italian tenor
- Johnathan Cyprien, NFL safety
- Louis Delmas, former NFL safety
- Paul Gleason, film and television actor
- Max Jean-Gilles, former NFL guard
- MC Jin, rapper, actor, and comedian
- Larry Kahn, tiddlywinks player
- Marlins Man, sports fan and lawyer
- Brad Meltzer, novelist, non-fiction writer, TV show creator, and comic book author
- Cheryl Patton, Miss Florida USA 1967, Miss USA 1967
- Sheryl Sandberg, technology and business executive, philanthropist, and writer
- Eugene Wilde. Singer, Songwriter, Music Producer
- Jonathan Zaslow, sports radio show host
