= Patrick Barrie =

British tiddlywinks player

Patrick Barrie is a British tiddlywinks player. He has won twelve World Singles matches, most recently in October 2026 by defeating Dave Lockwood in a seven hour bout, making him (as of October 2026) the current world champion. He has won eight World Pairs matches (most recently partnering Harley Jones), but lost the World Pairs title in April 2022 to Larry Kahn and Jon Mapley.

Barrie started playing tiddlywinks in 1984 as an undergraduate at Cambridge University, where he is a senior lecturer in chemical engineering. He has a long rivalry with American player Larry Kahn, with the Los Angeles Times describing them as "the Nadal and Djokovic of their game". The pair have played 11 World Singles matches, with Barrie winning three, and eight World Pairs matches (each with various partners) with four wins apiece.

He has also won the English Tiddlywinks Association (ETwA) Singles (English national championship) twelve times and the ETwA Pairs nine times. His tiddlywinks exploits have seen him sponsored by a whisky distillery, with his image appearing on some of their bottles.
