= James Goldstein =

American basketball superfan

- Born: January 5, 1940 (age 86); Milwaukee, Wisconsin, U.S.

James F. Goldstein (born January 5, 1940) is an American businessman who attends a large number of National Basketball Association (NBA) games, typically in courtside seats, including many home games for the Los Angeles Lakers and the Los Angeles Clippers. He also travels to watch games, especially during the NBA playoffs, and often attends post-game press conferences.

"He has so much invested in our sport," former NBA commissioner David Stern said. "He probably has the largest investment of any fan in America, so we get a kick out of him. He has got quite a flair, and we love him as a sort of a superfan."

== Biography ==
The son of Nanette (née Gamse) and Milwaukee department store owner, C. Ellis Goldstein, Goldstein said he began watching NBA games as a 10-year-old. At the age of 15, he was hired to keep game statistics by the Milwaukee Hawks. "Once I did that and sat courtside for the games, I was totally hooked", he said. "My entire life has been devoted to professional basketball since then. I have such a passion for the game. I think there's more athleticism displayed in basketball than in any other sport." Goldstein graduated from Nicolet High School in Glendale, Wisconsin where he played on the basketball team. He then attended Stanford University and has remained in California ever since.

Having attended over 2,000 games, Goldstein befriended several current and former NBA players, including Wilt Chamberlain, Clyde Drexler, Hakeem Olajuwon, Shaquille O'Neal, Sam Cassell, and Dennis Rodman. He claims to have no favorite team, in spite of his Lakers and Clippers season tickets. He describes himself as a fan of the NBA in general.

Goldstein refuses to disclose his net worth or how he made his fortune. The Wall Street Journal speculated that Goldstein made billions in real estate (notably Century City in Los Angeles).

It was reported by The Hollywood Reporter in 2020 that Goldstein made his money in mobile home parks, by "packaging groups of properties into investment vehicles and then suing municipalities...if they thwart his attempts to end rent control." Carson, California's city attorney Sunny Soltani referred to his tactics as "litigation terrorism," accused him of building his fortune "on the backs of the most vulnerable people in society," and estimated cities have spent millions to fight him.

He has never married and has no children. He has stated that he does not believe in marriage.

== Residence ==
Goldstein's house, known as the Sheats–Goldstein Residence, has been featured in Architectural Digest, DOLCE magazine, The New York Times, Robb Report, The Local Project and Town & Country. The house was designed in 1963 by John Lautner, a student of Frank Lloyd Wright. Goldstein purchased the property in 1972 from previous owners who allegedly did not keep the house in good condition. Goldstein commissioned Lautner to make changes and improvements to the house. Below the main residence is an installation by light artist James Turrell known as "Skyspace" or "Sky Box".

Goldstein worked closely with Lautner and Duncan Nicholson, who took over after Lautner's death in 1994. Nicholson is now the chief architect. "I wanted to remake the house exactly as John [Lautner] would have wanted it, and to introduce technology that didn't exist 30 years ago", Goldstein said. The property next door to his also had a Lautner-designed house on it, which Goldstein bought and tore down to build a party house, tennis court and office. In 2016, Goldstein promised that the house eventually will become the property of the Los Angeles County Museum of Art.

The residence has also been featured in a number of movies and TV shows, including Charlie's Angels: Full Throttle, French Exit, The Big Lebowski, and Selling Sunset.

== See also ==
- Marlins Man
