= Dave Lockwood (tiddlywinks) =

American tiddlywinks player

David Lockwood (born 1952 or 1953) is an American tiddlywinks player. He has won 41 national and world tiddlywinks titles.

== Biography ==
Lockwood attended college at Massachusetts Institute of Technology (MIT), graduating in 1975. Lockwood's professional career was as an airplane executive. As of 1978, he was an economic forecaster for Pan Am. In 1988, he gave his profession as aviation specialist with Booz Allen Hamilton. He worked as an economist for Gulf Air, an airline based in Bahrain as of 1994.

Lockwood began playing tiddlywinks during his freshman year at MIT. He signed up to play the game as a joke after viewing it in the student handbook. He plays using the nickname "The Dragon", alluding to the fact that he was born in the Year of the Dragon. Lockwood has won 41 national and world tiddlywinks titles. He has additionally won five international titles competing as a duo with Larry Kahn. Lockwood and Kahn frequently compete against each other, with Sports Illustrated comparing their rivalry to that of Muhammad Ali and Joe Frazier. In 1979, Lockwood held the record for most consecutive shots "potted" (made into the cup) without missing, at 722. In 1988, he and Kahn held the world record for the fewest shots taken (21) to pot 12 winks from the corner of a standard wink table.

Lockwood is involved in coordinating and organizing tiddlywinks events and tournaments, and was the head of the International Federation of Tiddlywinks Associations.

== Personal life ==
Lockwood married Deja Lockwood and has five children, all of whom he taught how to play tiddlywinks.

His third child, Max, became one of the youngest tiddlywinks players to win a national title, which he did at age 12 by winning the North American Pairs championship in 2001, competing in a team with his father.
