= Allison Academy School (North Miami Beach, Florida) =

Location
- 1881 Northeast 164th Street; North Miami Beach; Miami, (Miami-Dade), Florida 33162; United States
- 25.92727°N 80.16291°W

Information
- Type: Private, Independent
- Religious affiliation: Non-denominational
- Opened: 1983
- Founder: Dr. Sarah Allison
- Head of school: Shaidy Fernandez
- Grades: 6-12
- Colors: Green and white
- Website: allisonacademy.com

Allison Academy School is a private, non-denominational, co-ed private middle and high school (grades 6-12) in North Miami Beach, Florida, United States. It is located 5 miles (8.0 km) north of Downtown Miami.

== History ==
Sarah Allison founded Allison Academy as an independent private school in 1983. The school evolved from the Reading, Math, and Learning Center started by Dr. Allison in 1970, to meet student needs and parental demands for a full-time program offering an intensive developmental and enrichment curriculum. Prior to founding Allison Academy, Dr. Allison served as a consultant to private schools and has taught in public schools in Gadsden and Broward Counties. She is a member of the Board of the Association of Independent Schools of Florida where she has held offices and is a Director Emerita.

== Curriculum ==
Most courses are offered at two levels, some including Honors and Advanced Placement. Students are placed in courses that best suit their background and ability, and it is not unusual for students to have an academic schedule that includes courses from different levels.

As for graduation requirements, 24 academic credits plus physical education are required, although 28 credits are recommended.

== Academics ==
The school's enrollment is approximately 100 students. The average class size ranges from 12–14 students.

== Art ==
Using various media ranging from pastels, ceramics, sewing, sculpture, and painting, students experience different levels of art. The focus of the art program is to develop appreciation and enjoyment of visual art and the creative process.

Allison Academy has a rock/jazz band, which has developed into a professional sounding group and has performed at local venues, city functions, talent shows, and for Allison Academy students and faculty. School also has drama classes, in which students express their creativity through dramatic interpretation and expression. The students write and perform their own dramatic productions.

== Athletics ==
Through team sports, students are encouraged to reach their potential in physical fitness, skill development, teamwork, sportsmanship, discipline, and leadership. Nearly 80% of students play at least one sport and many are two-to-three season athletes.

Allison Academy has a boys’ basketball team that has a schedule of 15 – 20 games each season. The team competes against other schools within the area. The girls’ volleyball team is competitive and plays 10-15 games each season.

== Students ==
The course program provided by Allison Academy is designed to follow the Next Generation Sunshine State Standards for Curriculum and to use state-adopted textbooks and ebooks to meet the objective of obtaining a high school diploma and of preparing students for higher education—college, university, or technical/vocational institutions. Graduates from the academy are recognized by leading universities. After graduation, 87% of students from the school go on to attend a 4-year college.

== International Students ==
Allison Academy is part of the more than 250 top schools Cambridge Network International. Through this program, foreign students are placed in environments that meet the Cambridge Network’s Golden Standards.

== Faculty ==
The principal is Shaidy Fernandez. 36 percent of faculty members have masters or doctoral degrees.

== Accreditation and membership ==
Allison Academy School is accredited or a member of the following organizations:

- Advancing Excellence in Education (AdvancED)
- Association of Independent Schools of Florida (AISF)
- Middle States Association (MSA)
- National Council for Private School Accreditation (NCPSA)
- Southern Association of Colleges and Schools (SACS)
