= Fulford-by-the-Sea Monument =

- Fulford by the Sea Entrance
- U.S. National Register of Historic Places
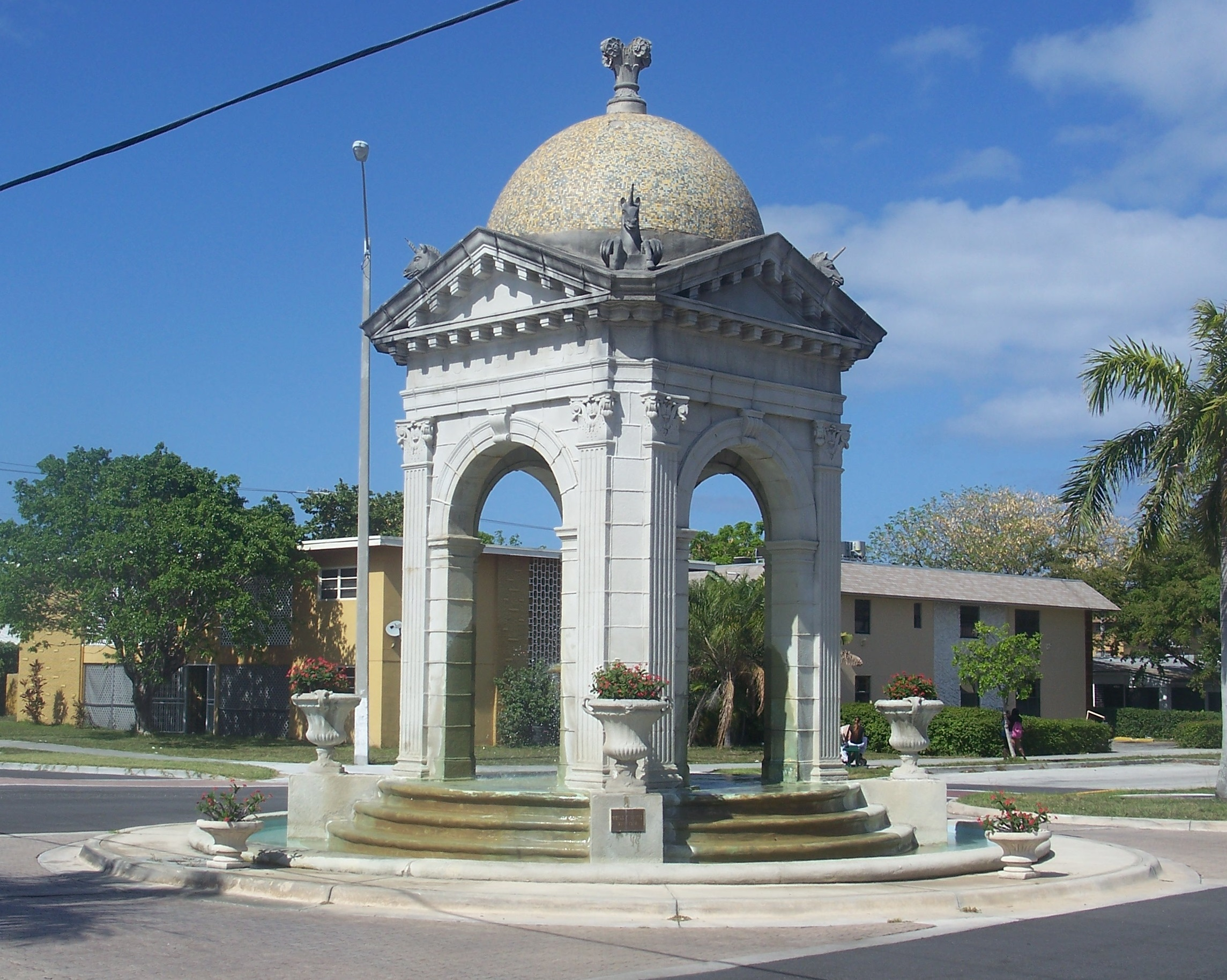

- Location within Miami Location within Florida Location within the United States
- Location: North Miami Beach, Florida
- Coordinates: 25.934722°N 80.154167°W
- Built: 1925
- Architect: Harry J. Beshgetoorian
- NRHP reference No.: 10000937
- Added to NRHP: November 29, 2010

The Fulford-By-The-Sea Monument is a historic fountain in North Miami Beach, Florida. It was built in 1925 as part of the development project by the Fulford-by-the-Sea Company. The fountain was one of the largest built in South Florida in the 1920s. There were intended to be four other similar fountains at other access points to the development. However, the Great Miami Hurricane of 1926 and the end of the Florida land boom prevented their construction. The fountain is a Dade Historical Site and its image is part of the North Miami Beach city logo. On November 29, 2010, it was added to the National Register of Historic Places as Fulford by the Sea Entrance.
