= Greynolds Park =

Park in Miami

Coordinates: 25.9417419°N 80.153341°W

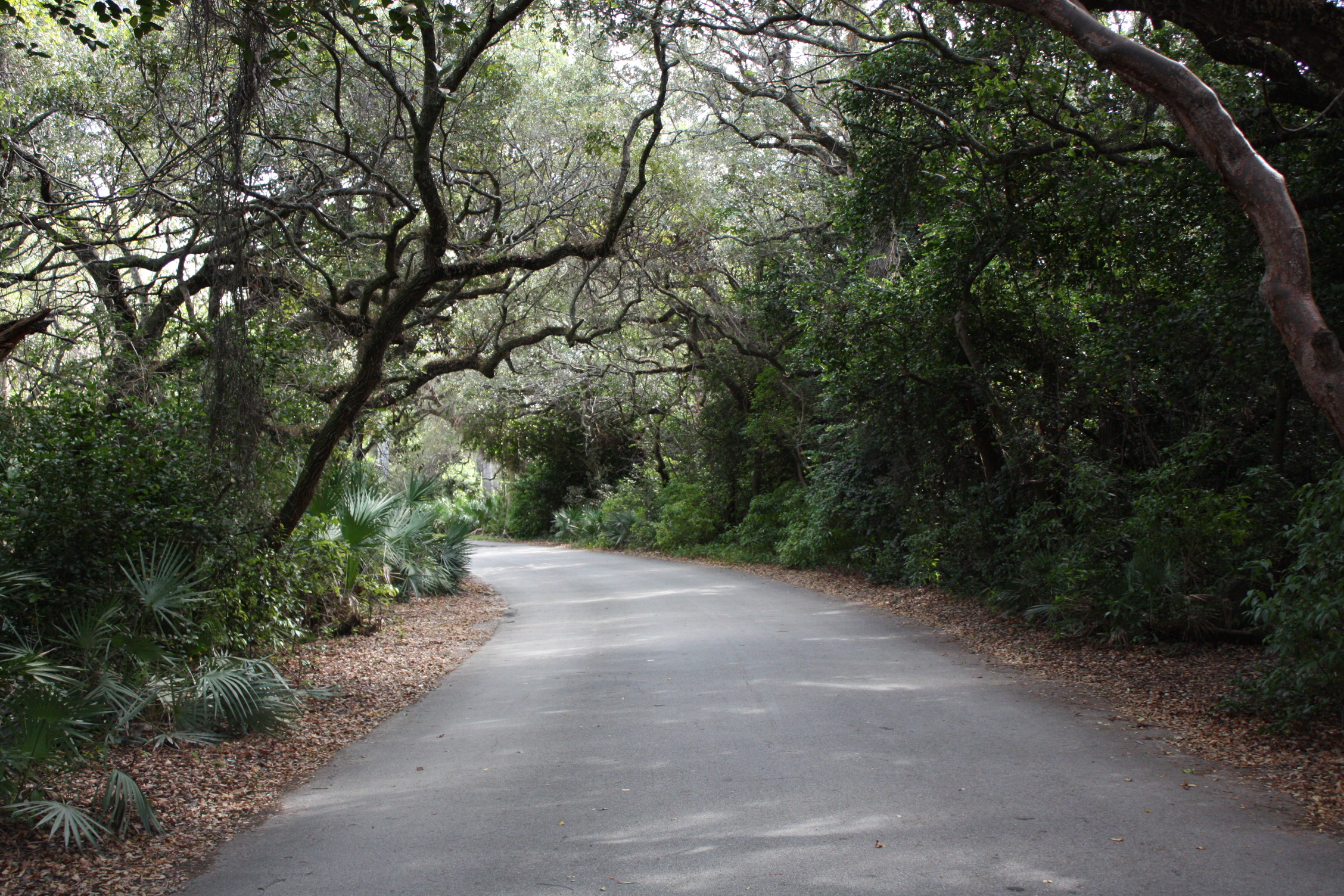
- Pavement toward park golf course
- Interactive map of Greynolds Park
- Type: Municipal
- Location: Ojus, Miami-Dade County, Florida, United States
- Area: 265 acres (1.07 km^{2})
- Created: 1933
- Operator: Miami-Dade County Parks and Recreation Department
- Website: Greynolds Park

Greynolds Park is a 265-acre (1.07 km^{2}) urban park in metropolitan Miami, just north of North Miami Beach, Florida, United States.

== History ==
In 1933 A. O. Greynolds donated the tract of land, originally used as a limestone quarry, to Dade County. The park was developed between 1936 and 1939 by the Civilian Conservation Corps as a part of the New Deal public works program.

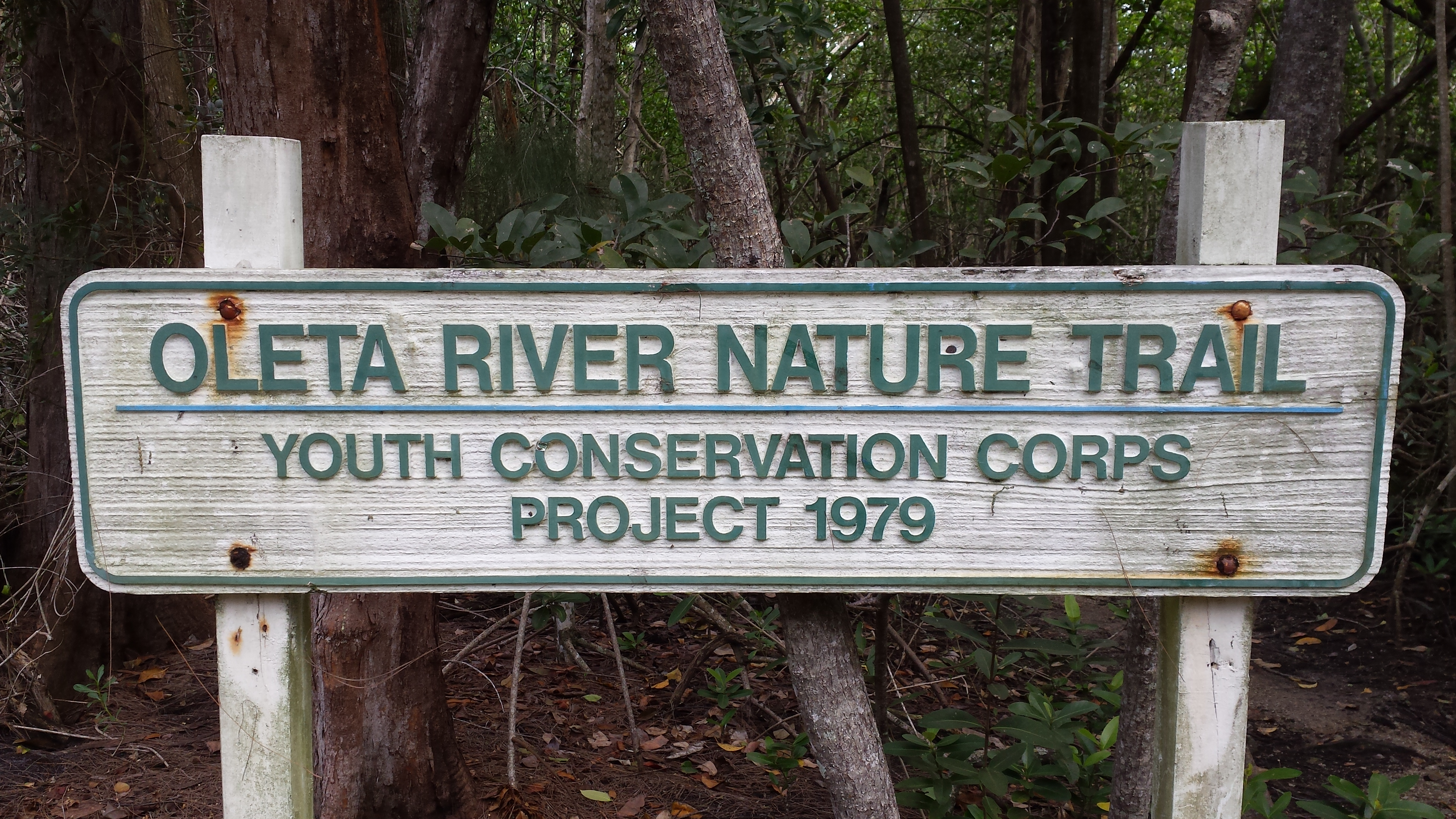
Oleta River Youth Conservation Corps 1979 Oleta River Nature Trail and Mangrove Footbridge Entrance Sign

In 1979, the Youth Conservation Corp constructed the Oleta River Nature Trail and wooden footbridge on the shallows of the Oleta River through the mangroves.

== Facilities ==
The park offers various amenities, including picnic and recreation areas, a golf course, a bird rookery, a boathouse, and a 42-foot (13 m) mound, the highest point in South Florida.

The boathouse features a nature exhibit and offers interpretive programs including guided (or unguided) nature walks, lectures, campfires and more. Kayak, canoe and paddleboat rentals are available on weekends and holidays.

In the early 1990s, the resident alligators were removed from Greynolds Park. These were the “protectors” of the bird rookery. Within 2 years of their removal the bird rookery no longer existed. The birds did not want their nests raided by the park’s raccoons and moved to other locations during nesting season. They have not returned to the park ever since.
