= Intercession City, Florida =

Intercession City
- Unincorporated Community
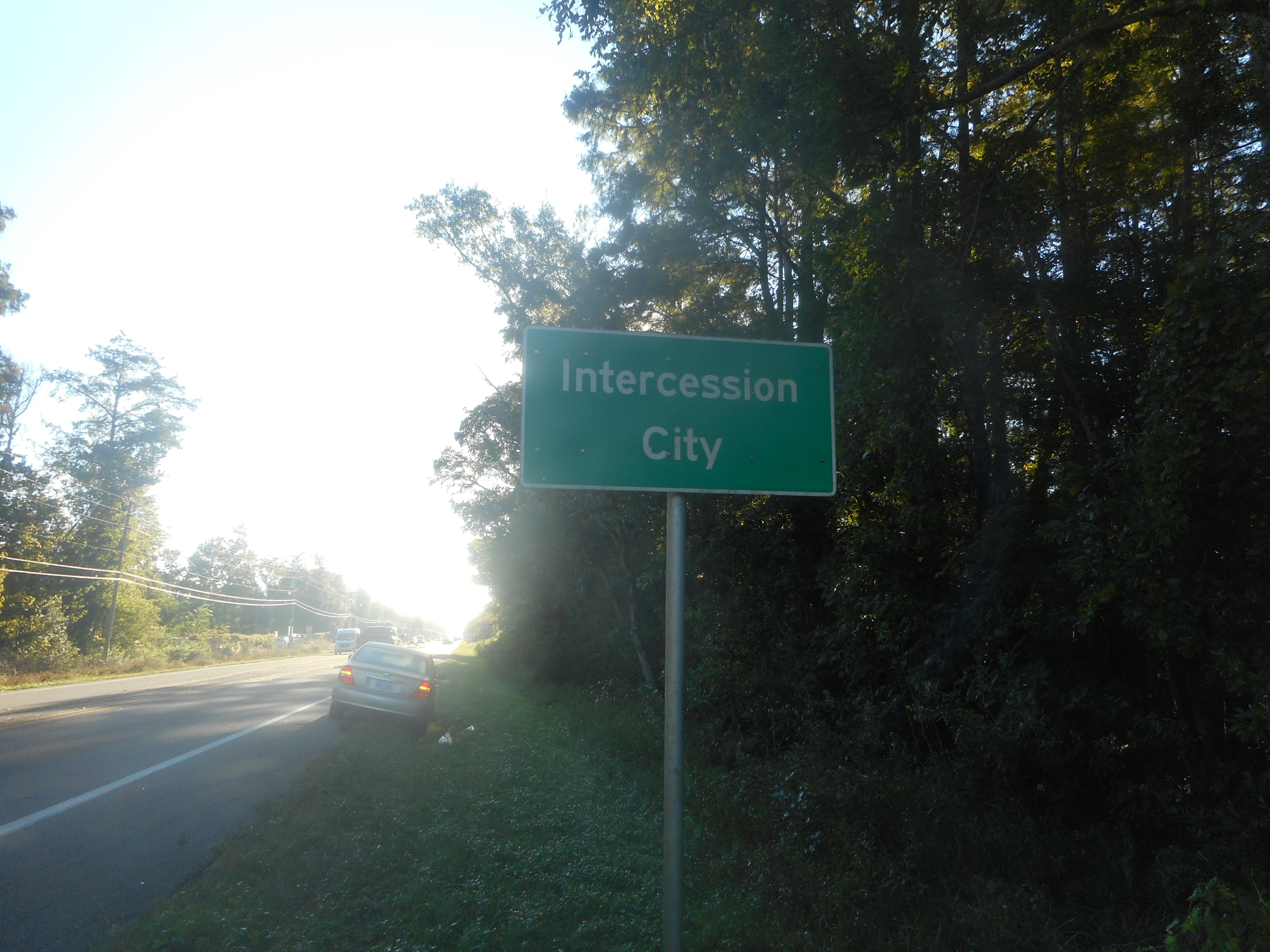
- Northeast-bound US 17-92 as it enters Intercession City

- Location within Florida
- Coordinates: 28°15′45″N 81°30′28″W
- Country: United States
- State: Florida
- County: Osceola
- Elevation: 69 ft (21 m)

Population (2010)
  - Total: 851
- ZIP code: 33848
- GNIS feature ID: 284561

Intercession City is an unincorporated community located in central Florida, United States, approximately five miles west of Kissimmee, in Osceola County, on Highway 17/92.

Osceola County is in the Eastern time zone UTC-5. The average high temperature in July is 91.3 degrees, with an average low temperature in January of 47.2 degrees. The average rainfall is approximately 51.7 inches per year.

The population was 851 as of 2010, with an estimated population of 1,492 as of 2015, mostly blue collar with a median family income of $37,000. 53 residents (5%) are 9 years old or younger, 173 residents (16%) are 10 to 17 years old, 298 residents (27%) are 18–24 years old, 181 residents (16%) are 25 to 39 years old, 368 residents (33%) 40 to 64 years old, and 38 residents (3%) are 65 years and older, the median age of people living in Intercession City is 29.7 years. The majority of residents are Non-Hispanic whites.

Originally known as Interocean City, the region was first developed to be a resort with coast-to-coast canals, but the developer ran out of money to pay his workers in the 1920s.
