= Chevelier, Florida =

- Planned community
- Location in Florida
- Coordinates: 25°43′13″N 81°12′59″W
- Country: United States of America
- State: Florida
- County: Monroe County
- Founder: James F. Jaudon
- Named for: Chevelier Corporation

Chevelier was a planned community located near Chevelier Point on Chevelier Bay, currently in the Everglades National Park. It is in Monroe County, Florida, United States.

== History ==
Chevelier, Florida was a community in which plans started in 1916 by James F. Jaudon, a Miami businessman. At the time during the early 20th century, many commercial developers such as Jaudon sought to drain and use it as an agricultural area. Jaudon created a corporation called the Chevelier Corporation to help sales. It was advertised that it was perfect land for sugarcane and agricultural usage. Land in Chevelier was $20 an acre. An advertisement map states that it had a half a million acres of land, 148,000,000 feet of timber that existed on the tract it was on. The flyer later states that it would have a scenic area preserved nearby. The Tamiami Trail was being proposed at the time which would help his city to develop he got very involved in the construction of it. When the trail was completed in 1928, there was not as large of an amount of development as expected and the Chevelier Corporation declared bankruptcy in 1937. It was then sold off to the federal government for back taxes. In 1947 the area became a part of the Everglades National Park and still is to the present.
