= Prinz Valdemar =

Steel-hulled schooner

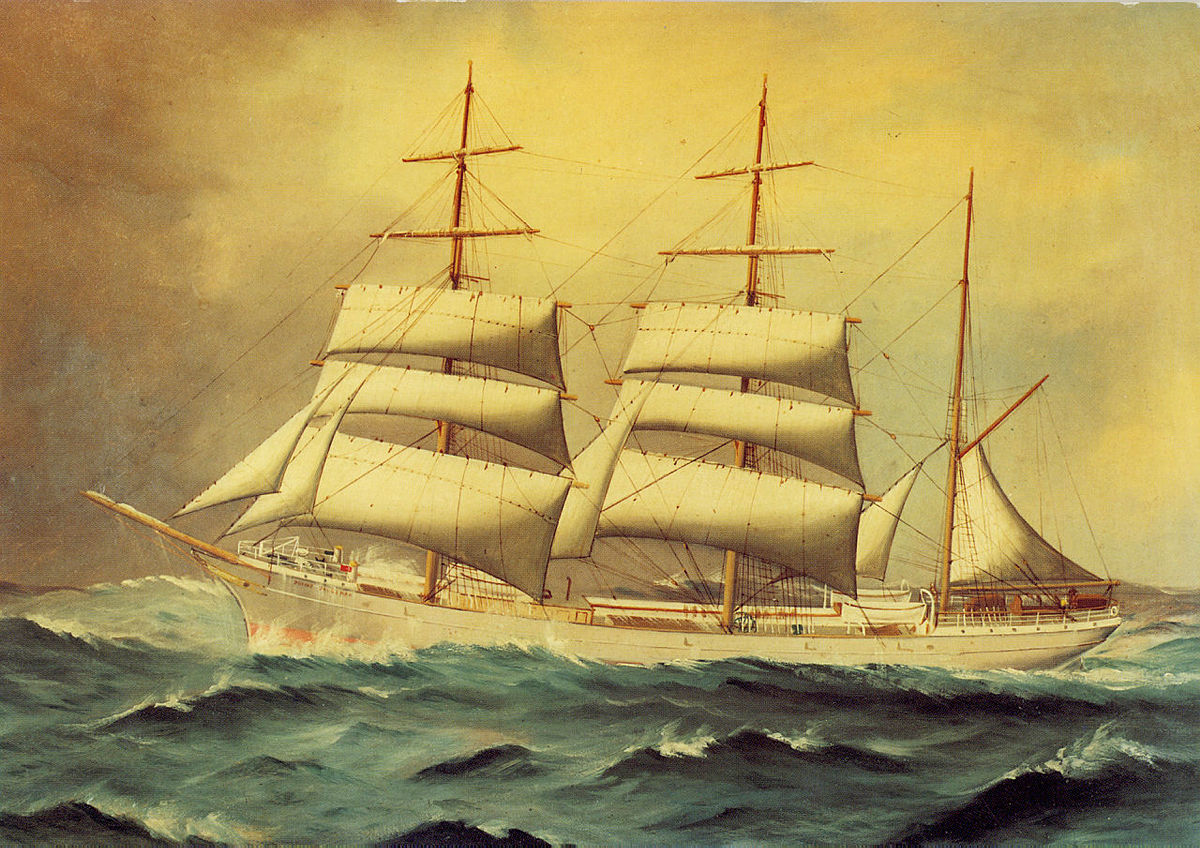
Prinz Valdemar

The Prinz Valdemar was a 241-foot steel-hulled schooner named after Prince Valdemar of Denmark. It was built in 1891 in Helsingør, Denmark along with its sister ship Prinsesse Marie, as one of the last great ships of the sailing ship era. It was based in Esbjerg, although registered on the nearby island of Fanø. The ship was sold to Norway in 1911 and then to the US. The ship was next purchased by German interests and used as a blockade runner, before being interned at Copenhagen. Prinz Valdemar was sold to an American company and briefly used to haul coconuts from Nicaragua.

There is a model of Prinz Valdemar at the Customs Museum of Copenhagen.

== Miami harbor ==
The ship sank in the mouth of the turning basin of Miami harbor on 10 January 1926. It was on its way to becoming a floating hotel, during the heady days of the Florida land boom of the 1920s. Railroads had already begun raising shipping rates in response to the strain created by the population boom, and when the sea route to Miami was blocked the city's image as a tropical paradise began to crumble. Investors were seeing primarily negative press on Miami by 1925, and the rising prices that fueled the land boom stopped rising. The first Miami real estate bubble had burst.

The former Prinz Valdemar was towed to near Bayfront Park and enclosed behind a steel bulkhead. After 1937, the area around the ship's hulk was filled in, and grass grew around the former vessel. Several businesses operated from the hulk, including an aquarium, a restaurant, and a beer garden. During World War II, it served as a recreation facility for U.S. Navy petty officers. After the war, the aquarium continued to operate out of the vessel until the city declined to renew its lease in 1949–50. After the departure of the aquarium, the hulk briefly served as a city youth center, but City of Miami engineers declared the vessel unsafe. It sat empty for about a year until it was sold for scrap. The vessel was dismantled in November and December 1952, and was described by the Associated Press in mid-December as "a heap of twisted metal on the edge of palm-lined Biscayne Boulevard".

The wheel of the Valdemar is on display at the HistoryMiami Museum on Flagler Street.
