= Tiddlywinks =

Game of strategy and skill

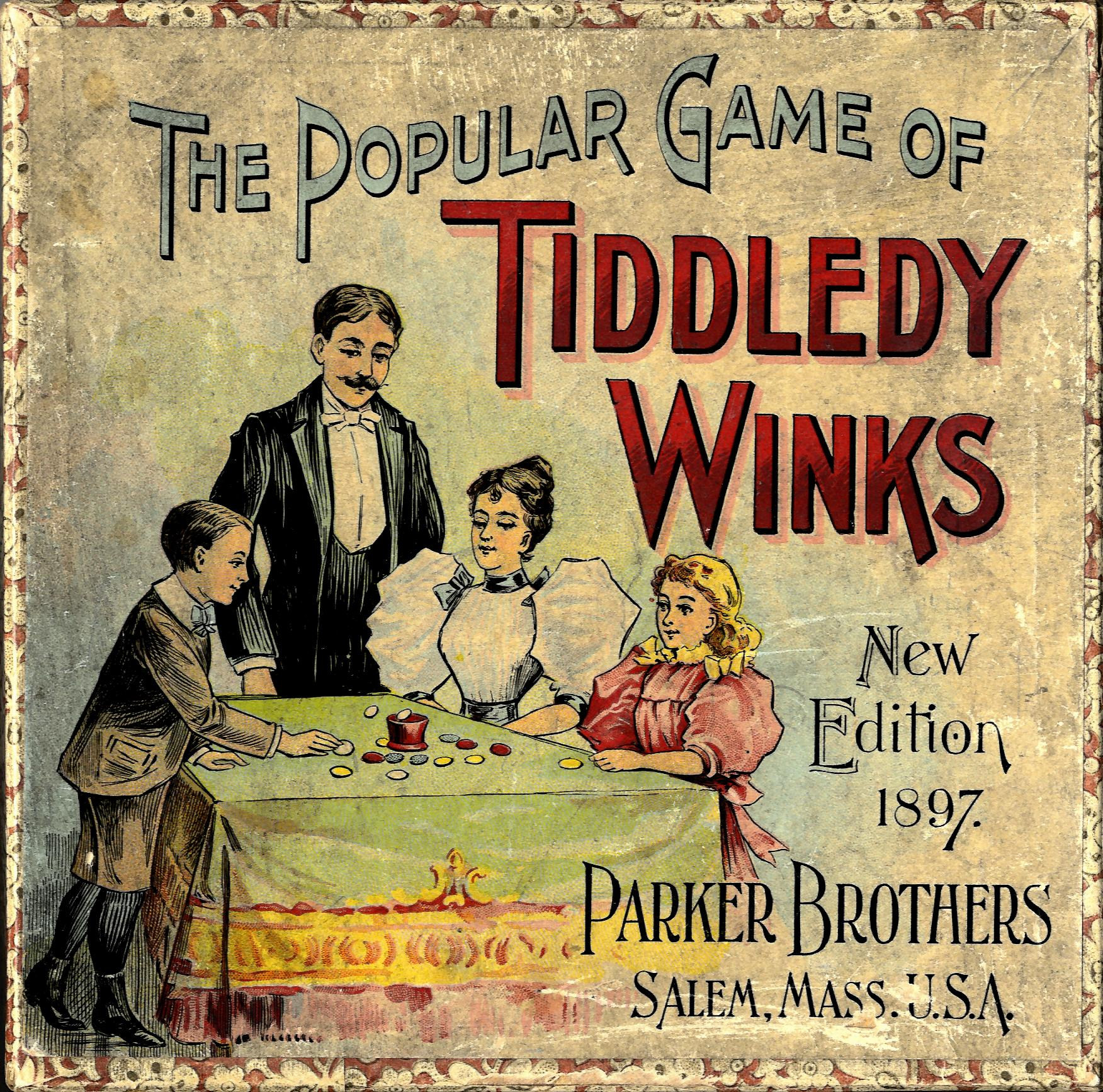
- Box Cover, 1897
- Years active: 1888 to present
- Genres: Skill & action game
- Players: usually 2 or 4; sometimes 3; 6 for a triples match
- Setup time: 1 minute
- Playing time: 30 minutes to an hour
- Skills: Strategy, physical skill
- Synonyms: Winks

Tiddlywinks is a game played on a flat felt mat with sets of small discs called winks, a pot, which is the target, and a collection of squidgers, which are also discs. Players use a squidger (nowadays made of plastic) to shoot a wink into flight by flicking the squidger across the top of a wink and then over its edge, thereby propelling it into the air. The offensive objective of the game is to score points by sending your own winks into the pot. The defensive objective of the game is to prevent your opponents from potting their winks by squopping them: shooting your own winks to land on top of your opponents' winks. As part of strategic gameplay, players often attempt to squop their opponents' winks and develop, maintain and break up large piles of winks.

Tiddlywinks is sometimes considered a simple-minded, frivolous children's game, rather than a sophisticated strategic game. However, the modern competitive game of tiddlywinks made a strong comeback at the University of Cambridge in 1955. The modern game uses far more complex rules and a consistent set of high-grade equipment.

== Etymology ==
Tiddlywinks derives from British rhyming slang for an unlicensed public house or a small inn only licensed to sell beer and cider (tiddlywink, kiddlywink). Tiddly was slang for an alcoholic drink. It may be related to pillywinks.

== Rules ==
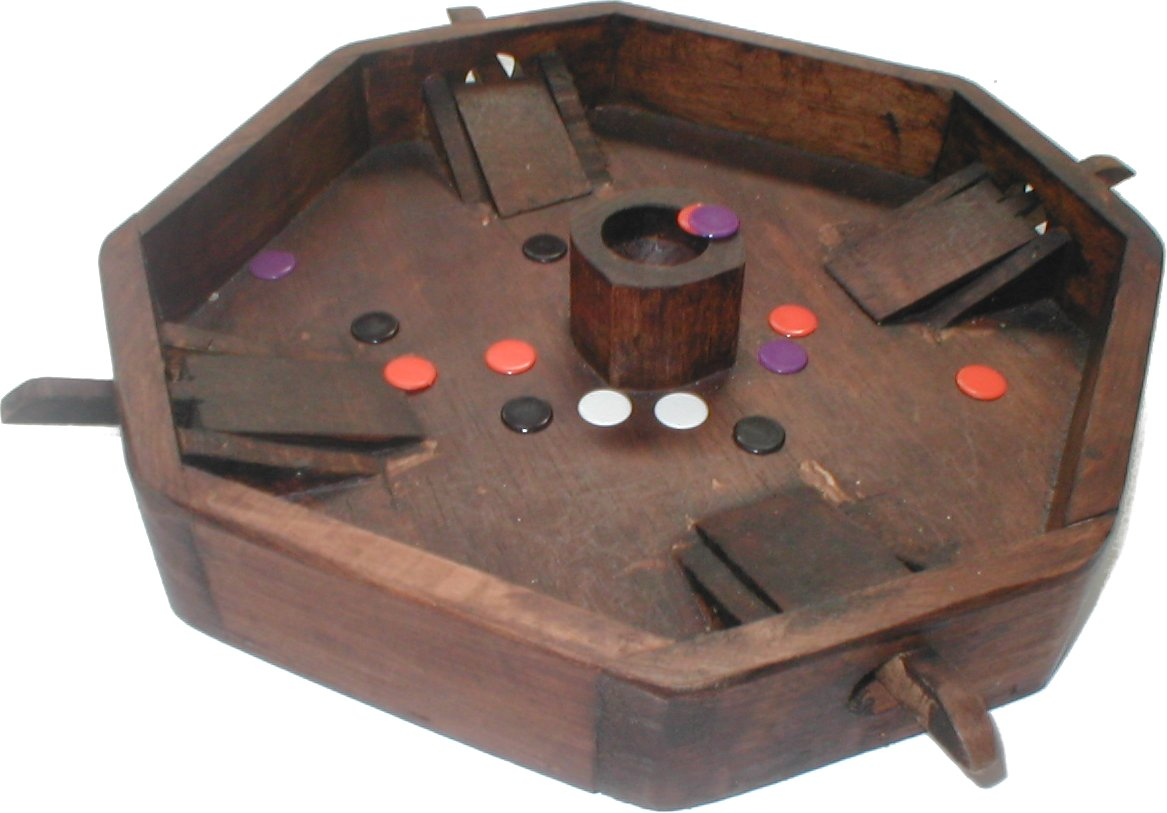
The French jeu de puces ("flea game"), a catapult version of tiddlywinks

Tiddlywinks is a competitive game involving four colours of winks. Each player controls the winks of a colour, the colours being blue, green, red and yellow. Red and blue are always partners against green and yellow. There are six winks of each colour, which begin the game in the corners of a felt mat measuring 6 feet by 3 feet. This mat is ordinarily placed on a table, and a pot is placed at its centre. There are two primary methods of play with the four colours of winks: a pairs game, and a singles game. The pairs game involves four players, playing in partnerships, with each winker playing a single colour. The singles game involves a single winker playing against another single winker, each playing two colours of winks in alternation.

The players take turns, and there are two basic aims: to cover (or squop) opponent winks, and to get one's own winks into the pot. As in pool or snooker, if a player pots a wink of their own colour, they are entitled to an extra shot, and this enables a skilled player to pot all of their winks in one turn. The point of squopping, which is the key element distinguishing the modern competitive game from the child's game (though recognized in even the earliest rules from 1890), is that a wink that is covered (even partially) may not be played by its owner. The wink on top may be played, though, and sophisticated play involves shots manipulating large piles of winks.

The game ends in one of two ways: either all the winks of one colour are potted (a pot-out), or play continues up to a specified time limit (usually 25 minutes), after which each colour has a further five turns. Then a scoring system is used to rank the players, based on the numbers of potted and unsquopped winks of each colour.

== Strategy ==
The important appeal of the game for many players is the required combination of manual dexterity and strategic thought as well as tactics. Tiddlywinkers often claim that the game combines physical skill (such as in snooker or golf) with the strategy of chess. Tiddlywinks is unique in the combination of skill and strategy it requires. Strategy in tiddlywinks is often rather deep, since winks can be captured by squopping (covering) them. Strategic and tactical planning involves anticipating opponents' moves rather than just building a sequence of one's own moves. Another factor that complicates the game is that there is a time limit to the play of the game; it does not merely run until some objective in the game has been met.

All in all, tiddlywinks goes beyond the purely cerebral nature of a game such as chess. The fact that shots can be made or missed, together with the continuum of possible outcomes, makes strategy much less rigid than in chess, and prevents planning more than seven or eight shots in advance.

== Equipment ==
The winks and pot used in competitive play are standard, and are supplied by the English Tiddlywinks Association. The pots are made of moulded plastic (historically always red), with specified diameters at the top and the base, and specified height. The winks are made to specified measurements, and are made by slicing an extruded cylinder rather than by moulding, and then smoothing them in a tumbler. Although this leads to some minor variation in thickness, it produces a much smoother edge to the wink than that seen on cheap moulded winks.

The mats are made of thick felt. Mats obtained from different suppliers have different characteristics, and part of the skill of a tournament player is to adjust to different mats.

Squidgers are custom-made by their owners or purchased from squidger makers. A player may use as many as they like, selecting an appropriate squidger for each shot. Top players may carry up to twenty different squidgers, but will not typically use all of them in one game. The rules governing squidgers permit a range of dimensions, and the material is not specified, except for the condition that squidgers must not damage either the winks or the mat. Modern squidgers are predominantly made from different types of plastic, though antique ones were made from bone, vegetable ivory, and other materials. Squidgers are usually filed or sanded to form a sharp edge and then polished.

== Terminology ==
Selected terms used in the game include:

Blitz: an attempt to pot all six winks of a given player's colour early in the game

Bomb: to send a wink at a pile, usually from distance, in the hope of significantly disturbing it

Boondock: to free a squopped wink by sending it a long way away, leaving the squopping wink free in the battle area

Bristol: a shot which moves a pile of two or more winks as a single unit; the shot is played by holding the squidger at a right angle to its normal plane

Carnovsky (US)/Penhaligon (UK): potting a wink from the baseline (i.e., from 3 feet away)

Cracker (UK): a simultaneous knock-off and squop, i.e. a shot which knocks one wink off the top of another while simultaneously squopping it

Crud (UK): a forceful shot whose purpose is to destroy a pile completely

Good shot: named after John Good. The shot consists of playing a flat wink (one not involved in a pile) through a nearby pile with the intent of destroying the pile

Gromp: an attempt to jump a pile onto another wink (usually with the squidger held in a conventional rather than a Bristol fashion)

John Lennon memorial shot: a simultaneous boondock and squop

Lunch: to pot a squopped wink (usually belonging to an opponent)

Scrunge (UK): to bounce out of the pot

Squidger: the disc used to shoot a wink

Squop: to play a wink so that it comes to rest above another wink

Sub: to play a wink so that it (unintentionally) ends up under another wink

Tiddlies: points calculated when determining the finishing placement of winkers in a tiddlywinks game

== History ==
=== Nineteenth century ===
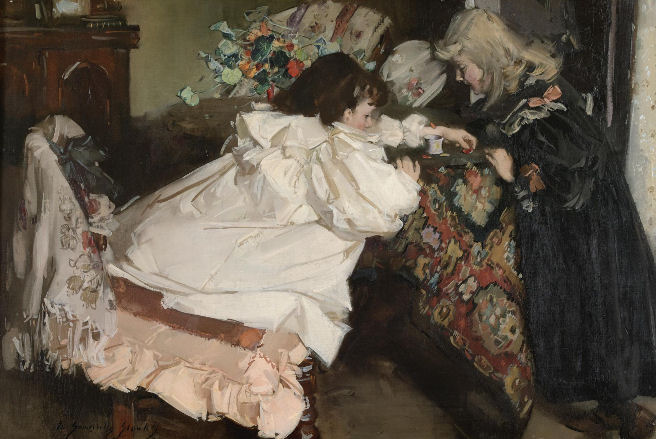
Tiddley Winks by William Somerville Shanks (1897)

The game began as a parlour game in Victorian England. Bank clerk Joseph Assheton Fincher (1863–1900) filed the original patent application for the game in 1888 and applied for the trademark Tiddledy-Winks in 1889. John Jaques and Son were the exclusive distributors of the game named Tiddledy-Winks.

However, competition was quite fierce, and for several years starting in 1888 other game publishers came out with their own versions of the game using other names, including Spoof, Flipperty Flop, Jumpkins, Golfette, Maro, Flutter, and many others. It became one of the most popular crazes during the 1890s, played by adults and children alike.

Throughout its history, many different varieties were produced to meet the marketplace demands, including those combining tiddledy-winks principles with tennis, basketball, baseball, croquet, cricket, football, golf, and other popular sports and endeavours. Throughout the first half of the twentieth century, the public perception of the game changed.

=== Competition organisations ===
There are two national associations, the English Tiddlywinks Association (ETwA) and the North American Tiddlywinks Association (NATwA), (the Scottish Tiddlywinks Association having disbanded in the late 1990s). These organisations are responsible for conducting tournaments and maintaining the rules of the game. International competition is overseen by the International Federation of Tiddlywinks Associations (IFTwA), founded on 16 June 1963 though in practice it is rarely called upon to intervene.

Although tiddlywinks nowadays is a singles or pairs game, competition in the 1950s until the 2000s centred on team competition, with teams consisting of several (two to four) pairs. There were a number of university teams, and international matches were also played. More recently, singles and pairs tournaments have come to be the focus of competitive tiddlywinks, with only a few team matches being played each year. The four most prestigious tournaments are the National Singles and National Pairs tournaments held in England and the United States. The World Singles and World Pairs championships operate on a challenge basis; anyone winning a national tournament (or being the highest-placed home player behind a foreign winner) is entitled to challenge the current champion.

There are several other less prestigious tournaments in England and the United States throughout the year, often with a format designed to encourage inexperienced players. The results of tournaments and world championship matches are used to calculate Tiddlywinks Ratings, which give a ranking of players.

=== 1950s ===
The birth of the modern game can be traced to a group of Cambridge University undergraduates meeting in Christ's College on 16 January 1955. Their aim was to devise a sport at which they could represent the university. Within three years the Oxford University Tiddlywinks Society was formed; although the two universities had been playing matches since 1946. In 1957, an article appeared in The Spectator entitled "Does Prince Philip cheat at tiddlywinks?" Sensing a good publicity opportunity the Cambridge University Tiddlywinks Club (CUTwC) challenged Prince Philip (later to become Chancellor of the university in 1976) to a tiddlywinks match to defend his honour. The Duke of Edinburgh appointed The Goons as his Royal champions. The Duke presented a trophy, the Silver Wink, designed and made by Robert Welch for the British Universities Championship.

The English Tiddlywinks Association (ETwA) was founded on 12 June 1958 with the Reverend Edgar "Eggs" Ambrose Willis as its first Secretary-General.

=== 1960s ===
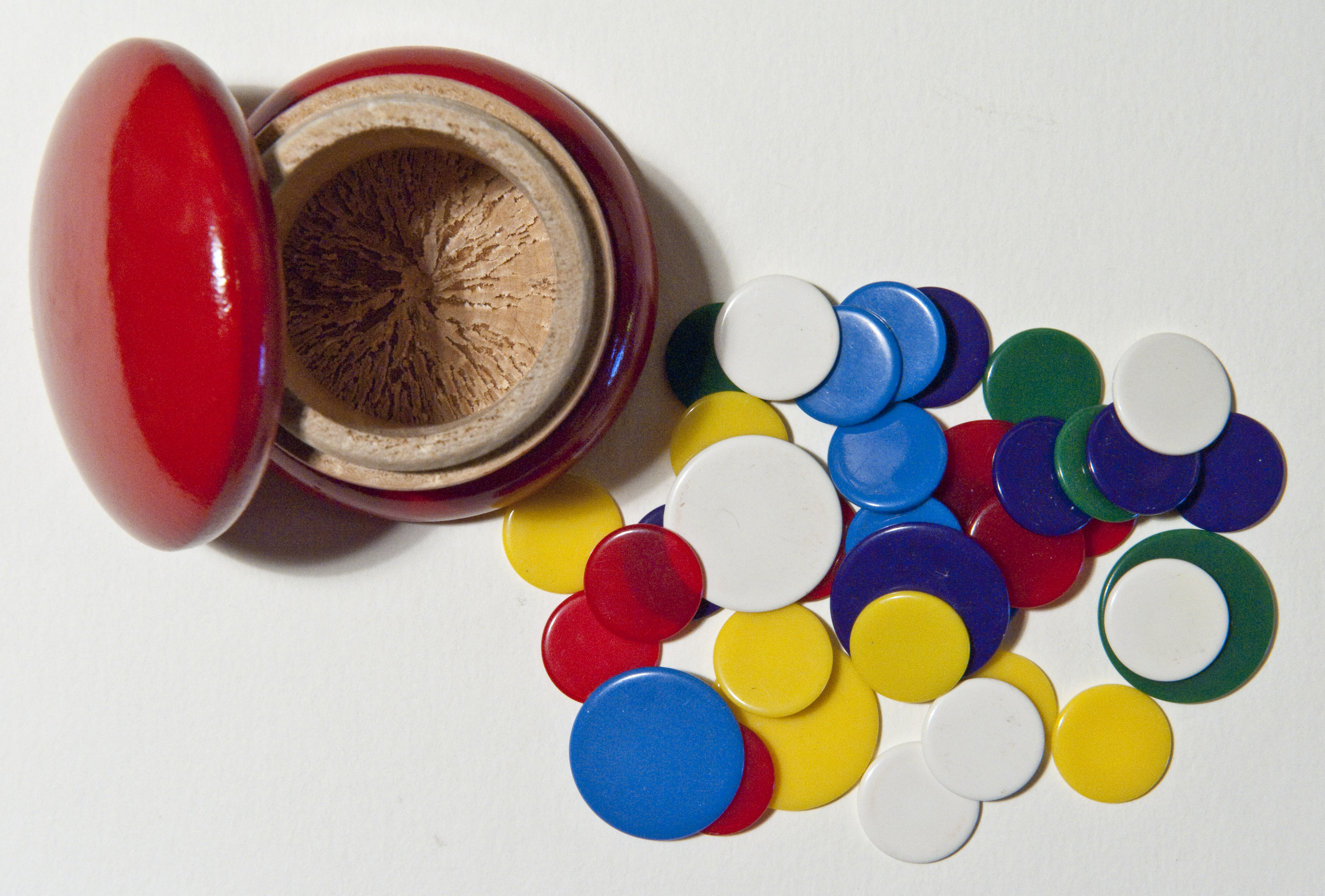
A European red wooden mushroom-style tiddlywinks container with smaller nylon wink discs and larger nylon squidger discs (1960s)

During the 1960s as many as 37 universities were playing the game in Great Britain.

In 1962, the Oxford University Tiddlywinks Society (OUTS) toured the United States for several weeks under the sponsorship of Guinness. They were undefeated against various hastily formed teams such as a group of Madison Avenue executives, the Seattle World's Fair "All-Stars", and a group of Harvard students. A match against the New York Giants was scheduled but the football players backed out at the last moment. A very prominent article appeared in Life magazine on 14 December 1962 with coverage of the Harvard team. Harvard's Gargoyle Undergraduate Tiddlywinks Society (GUTS) dominated winks in this era. In the next few years, Harvard and other colleges continued to play, though at a low ebb. From 1962 to 1966, tiddlywinks play in the United States was governed by the National Undergraduate Tiddlywinks Association (NUTS).

The North American Tiddlywinks Association (NATwA) was formed on 27 February 1966, replacing NUTS, with founders from both American (Harvard University and Harvard Medical School) and Canadian (University of Waterloo and Waterloo Lutheran University) teams.

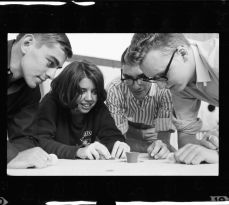
University of Waterloo students playing tiddlywinks (1966)

In the meantime, in the fall of 1965, Severin Drix started a team at Cornell, and challenged his friend Ferd Wulkan of MIT to start a tiddlywinks team. MIT and Cornell played in NATwA's tiddlywinks tournaments starting in February 1967, and became dominant. The Harvard and Waterloo teams disappeared from the scene by 1968. The game took particularly strong root at MIT, and the early development of most American players can still be traced to MIT today.

While the basic elements of the modern strategic game were devised by CUTwC in its early years, the rules have continued to be modified under the auspices of the various national tiddlywinks associations. ETwA coordinated the game throughout the boom period of the 1960s when winks flourished. A decline in interest within the UK in 1969–1970 led to the establishment of the three national competitions which have been contested to date, namely the National Singles, National Pairs, and the Teams of Four. There are also annual Open Competitions, notably in Oxford, Cambridge and London.

=== 1970s ===
The first serious trans-Atlantic contact was established in 1972, when a team from MIT including Dave Lockwood toured the UK. The success of the Americans shocked complacent Britons. Competition started at the highest level, the World Singles, in 1973. A challenge system was agreed between ETwA and NATwA. The supreme ruling body in world contests is the International Federation of Tiddlywinks Associations (IFTwA). To challenge at the world level, a player must win one of the national titles, or finish as the highest placed home player behind a foreign winner. There have been over 65 World Singles contests to date. The Americans dominated all the early matches, and it was not until the 22nd contest that a Briton won for the first time. Since then the top Britons and Americans have been closely matched. After the establishment of the World Singles, a World Pairs event followed, and there have since been over 40 World Pairs contests. International matches have been played since 1972.

=== Twenty-first century ===
During its history, winks has enjoyed variable levels of interest. The game has never taken a strong hold outside the UK and North America. The focus of British tiddlywinks is still at Cambridge, and CUTwC's 50th anniversary celebrations in 2005 were well attended. The Oxford University Tiddlywinks Society fell out of existence in the mid-2000s, but was competing again from 2023. There was a resurgence in the game, with new clubs having been formed recently in the University of York and in Shrewsbury School.

In America, there has been a tradition of tiddlywinks in Washington D.C., Boston, Eastern Ohio, and Ithaca, New York. There was a renewal of winks in 2007 through the MIT Tiddlywinks Association. National competitions are well attended, with a group of enthusiastic young players joining the stock of veteran players who have proved themselves at the highest level in world competition. In the US, the game had a firm footing in certain high schools, since the children of many of the players who took up the game in the late 1960s and early 1970s played when they were in high school. These players are now looking to revive university tiddlywinks in the United States.

On 1 March 2008, there was a Royal Match in Cambridge to commemorate the 50th anniversary of the original Royal Match played against The Goons in 1958 (see above). CUTwC players took on HRH Prince Philip's Royal Champions, the Savage Club, with members of the original 1958 CUTwC team in attendance. Cambridge repeated their victory from 1958 by winning the match 24–18.

Since 2000, the World Singles championship has been dominated by Patrick Barrie and Larry Kahn, with Barrie having won eight matches and Kahn seven (as of December 2025).
