= Marlins Man =

American sports fan (born 1956)

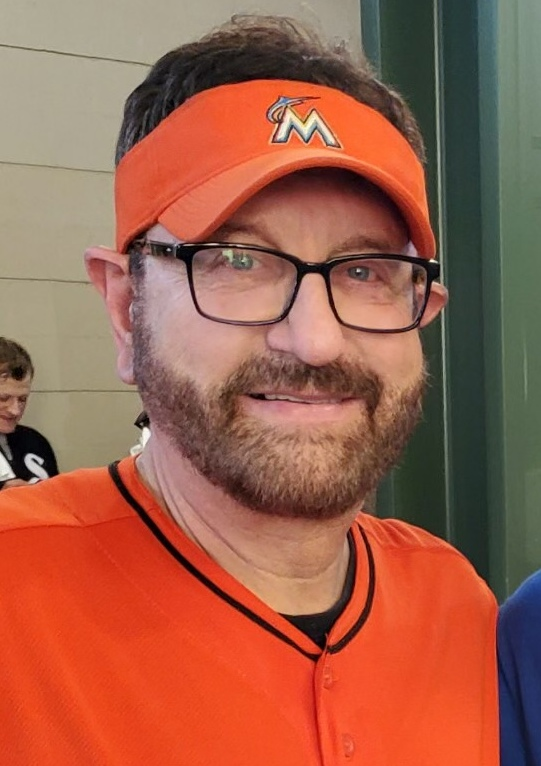
- Marlins Man in July 2021
- Born: Laurence Leavy; October 13, 1956 (age 70); North Miami Beach, Florida, U.S.
- Education: University of Miami School of Law
- Occupation: Lawyer
- Years active: 2012–present
- Known for: Sporting event attendance

Laurence Leavy (born October 13, 1956), better known as Marlins Man, is an American sports fan and lawyer from North Miami Beach, Florida. He gained fame in 2012 for his frequent appearances at major sporting events while wearing orange Miami Marlins apparel. His seating placement in view of broadcast cameras has drawn attention at the World Series, Super Bowl, NBA Finals, Kentucky Derby, Stanley Cup Final, College World Series, and other events. Leavy has been described by USA Today as a "ubiquitous superfan".

== Rise to prominence ==
Leavy's presence was first noted while attending a 2012 NBA Playoffs basketball game featuring the Miami Heat, where the team distributed white T-shirts before the game. Leavy wore an orange Marlins jersey and visor among the sea of white promo T-shirts, increasing his visibility on television. Later that year, Leavy was seen sitting behind home plate at AT&T Park during the World Series between the San Francisco Giants and the Detroit Tigers wearing a brightly colored jersey of neither team that was playing, increasing his visibility on television again. His pseudonym was coined as a result of this.

Leavy wears the highly visible orange uniforms introduced by the Miami Marlins in 2012. His previous attire, the Marlins' white jersey with teal pinstripes, was not noticeable in the stands.

His attendance at sporting events increased after being incorrectly diagnosed with liver cancer in 2014. In a 2014 interview, Leavy estimated that he spent an average of 300 days per year traveling to sporting events. He covers his airline fares with frequent-flyer miles and his hotel and car rental fees with credit card points. However, he pays for his front-row seats at sporting events in cash. In a 2017 interview, Leavy asserted he had attended 27 Super Bowls, 94 World Series games, 90 NBA Finals games, and "hundreds and hundreds of basketball and baseball playoffs games" to date.

Leavy is known among sports fans and often poses for photos. He has social media accounts on Twitter, Instagram, and Facebook. In addition to buying his own season tickets, he often buys season tickets for clients and friends, and orders drinks for newfound stadium friends. His presence is depicted in the video game MLB: The Show.

Leavy occasionally gives away Marlins jerseys on behalf of charities, including the March of Dimes. He also sold his jersey, visor, and tickets from the 2014 World Series for $5,621 on eBay, which was supposed to go to the Make-A-Wish Foundation.

== Break with the Marlins ==
According to Leavy, he began attending Miami Marlins games as a full season ticket holder in 1993, the year the team started. In March 2018 he told ESPN that he planned to discontinue his 25-year history of purchasing season tickets due to disagreements with the club over pricing. In December 2017 he offered $200,000 for four Diamond Club seats behind home plate for the 2018, 2019, and 2020 seasons, which included a proposed 10% discount "for the Marlins' lack of stars" due to the team trading away Giancarlo Stanton, Christian Yelich, Dee Gordon, and Marcell Ozuna, and another proposed 10% discount for advance payment. The Marlins countered with a package offer of $263,000 for the four seats and a credit for two season-tickets in outfield seats. Leavy rejected the offer and said he would no longer attend Marlins home games. Despite this turn of events, on September 17, 2018, Leavy won a charity auction to be a player for a day, which resulted in him signing a one-day "contract" with the Marlins.

== Notable events attended ==
Leavy has been seen at the following events:

- On October 21, 2014, Leavy sat behind home plate at Kauffman Stadium for the first game of the 2014 World Series between the Kansas City Royals and San Francisco Giants. His bright orange jersey—visible on every pitch taken from the center-field camera—agitated the Royals team and management, and he was offered a private suite if he would move out of his seat, or free World Series mementoes if he would cover up or put on a Royals jersey. Leavy, who had paid $8,000 for the seat, refused to change his outfit or move.
- In October 2015, at both MLB Wild Card games, in which the Houston Astros defeated the New York Yankees, and the Pittsburgh Pirates fell to the Chicago Cubs. He attended both series of the ALDS in which the Kansas City Royals defeated the Astros (attended games 1, 5 – Wore a blue Royals hat in game 5 instead of his usual orange Marlins visor) and the Toronto Blue Jays defeated the Texas Rangers. He also attended both series of the NLDS, in which the Cubs defeated the St. Louis Cardinals (attended game 3), and the New York Mets defeated the Los Angeles Dodgers. He was seen, again, attending the ALCS (Games 1, 2, 6 – He wore a blue hat in the 7th inning of game 6), in which the Royals defeated the Blue Jays, and the NLCS (Games 3, 4), in which the Mets defeated the Cubs. He attended all five games of the World Series between the Mets and the Royals. All in all, Leavy attended 148 games during the 2015 MLB season.
- On October 16, 2016, Leavy attended game two of the National League Championship Series between the Los Angeles Dodgers and the Chicago Cubs. Also in attendance was Marlins Woman, his girlfriend. His "girlfriend" was ultimately found out to be PFT Commenter of Barstool Sports.
- On May 10, 2017, Leavy bought the entire second row behind home plate for a Miami Marlins home game, bringing in women whom he asked to "jump up and down and cheer" to distract the opposing team. One woman flashed St. Louis Cardinals relief pitcher Brett Cecil during his windup.
- On October 5, 2019, he sat behind home plate at Yankee Stadium for game two of the American League Division Series between the New York Yankees and the Minnesota Twins, seated beside former New York City mayor Rudy Giuliani.
- On October 17, 2025, he sat behind home plate at Dodger Stadium for game four of the National League Championship Series between the Los Angeles Dodgers and Milwaukee Brewers, seated beside Ken Ozeki, a California-based "imposter Marlins Man" who had appeared at game four of the National League Division Series earlier in the month.
- On October 24, 2025, and October 27, 2025, he was seen sitting behind home plate for game one in Toronto and game three in Los Angeles of the 2025 World Series between the Los Angeles Dodgers and Toronto Blue Jays.

== Personal life ==
Leavy owns a workers' compensation firm, Laurence Leavy & Associates, with offices in Davie and Jacksonville, Florida, and incorporated and serves as president of Workers Compensation Legal Center, Inc. He works several billable hours per day from his hotel rooms while traveling, asserting that only 1 percent of his cases go to trial. Leavy is the owner of more than 100 thoroughbred horses and Starship Stables. He earned his undergraduate degree at Emory University, his MBA at Florida State University, and his Juris Doctor degree at the University of Miami Law School.
