= English Tiddlywinks Association =

- Sport: Tiddlywinks
- Abbreviation: ETwA
- Founded: 12 June 1958
- Affiliation: IFTwA
- Location: England
- Chairperson: Harley Jones
- Secretary: Andrew Garrard

Official website
- www.etwa.org
- (England)

The English Tiddlywinks Association (ETwA) was founded at a meeting at Christ's College, University of Cambridge on 12 June 1958. Its objectives are to promote the game of tiddlywinks and coordinate winking activities in the United Kingdom.

ETwA concerns itself with the maintenance of the official rules of tiddlywinks, arranging of tiddlywinks tournaments, and publishing of the journal Winking World which has been published roughly twice a year since 1961. An editor of Winking World was interviewed by Chris Evans on his BBC Radio 2 show on 5 August 2008.

Under the auspices of the English Tiddlywinks Association several tournaments are held throughout the year including The National Singles, The National Pairs, The ETwA National Teams of Four, The ETwA National Handicapped Individual Pairs, The Cambridge Open and The London Open. The winner of The National Singles is eligible to challenge the current World Singles champion, sponsored by the International Federation of Tiddlywinks Associations (IFTwA), and similarly the winners of The National Pairs may challenge the current World Pairs champions sponsored by IFTwA. International players can participate in ETwA tournaments. No ETwA tournament has a financial prize, although there are trophies. Results in all of these tournaments contribute to a player's World Rating.
