= 2013 North Miami mayoral election =

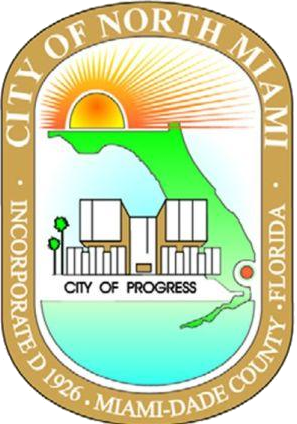
- May 14, 2013 (primary election); June 4, 2013 (general election)
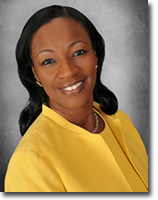

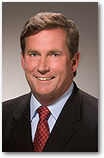

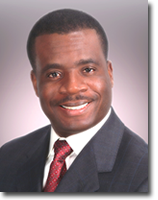
Candidate	Lucie Tondreau	Kevin Burns	Smith Joseph
First round	1,874; 27.56%	2,254; 33.15%	1,564; 23.00%
Runoff	4,062; 55.71%	3,229; 44.29%	Eliminated
Mayor before election
Andre Pierre
Nonpartisan
Elected mayor
Lucie Tondreau
Nonpartisan

The 2013 North Miami mayoral election took place on June 4, 2013, following a primary election on May 14, 2013. Incumbent Mayor Andre Pierre was term-limited and unable to seek a third term. Seven candidates ran to succeed him, including former Mayor Kevin Burns, City Councilman Jean Marcellus, former Police Chief Gwendolyn Boyd, physician Smith Joseph, and businesswoman Lucie Tondreau.

Joseph raised received significantly more campaign contributions than anyone else in the field, and loaned himself $105,000 for the campaign, while Burns retained name recognition from his previous tenure as Mayor, and Tondreau was endorsed by Pierre.

In the primary election, Burns placed first, winning 33 percent of the vote, and proceeded to a runoff election with Tondreau, who won 28 percent. Tondreau defeated Burns by a wide margin in the runoff, receiving 56 percent of the vote.

After the election, Burns contested the results, arguing that Tondreau did not meet the city charter's residency requirements. Though Burns's lawsuit was dismissed by the Miami-Dade County Circuit Court, the Third District Court of Appeal reversed the decision, and allowed Burns's post-election challenge to proceed.

However, Tondreau did not end up serving out her full term. In 2014, she was indicted by federal prosecutors for mortgage fraud, and was suspended from office by Governor Rick Scott. A special election was held in 2014 to fill the vacancy caused by Tondreau's suspension, which Joseph ultimately won.

== Primary election ==
=== Candidates ===
- Kevin Burns, former Mayor
- Lucie Tondreau, businesswoman
- Smith Joseph, physician
- Gwendolyn Boyd, former North Miami Chief of Police
- Jean Marcellus, City Councilman
- Modira Escarment, real estate broker
- Anna L. Pierre, businesswoman

=== Results ===
Primary election results
Party	Candidate	Votes	%
Nonpartisan	Kevin Burns	2,254	33.15%
Nonpartisan	Lucie Tondreau	1,874	27.56%
Nonpartisan	Smith Joseph	1,564	23.00%
Nonpartisan	Gwen Boyd	557	8.19%
Nonpartisan	Jean Rodrigue Marcellus	378	5.56%
Nonpartisan	Modira Escarment	116	1.71%
Nonpartisan	Anna L. Pierre	56	0.82%
Total votes		6,799	100.00%

== General election ==
=== Results ===
2013 North Miami mayoral election results
Party	Candidate	Votes	%
Nonpartisan	Lucie Tondreau	4,062	55.71%
Nonpartisan	Kevin Burns	3,229	44.29%
Total votes		7,291	100.00%
