= 2015 North Miami mayoral election =

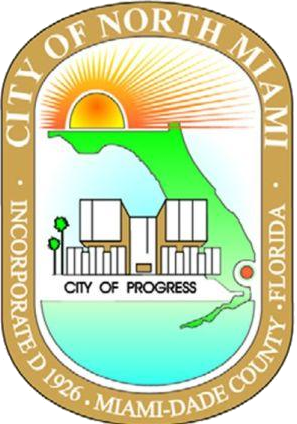
- May 12, 2015
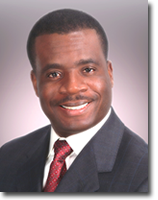
Candidate	Smith Joseph
Party	Nonpartisan
Popular vote	Unopposed
Percentage	100.00%
Mayor before election
Smith Joseph
Nonpartisan
Elected mayor
Smith Joseph
Nonpartisan

The 2015 North Miami mayoral election was held on May 12, 2015. Incumbent Mayor Smith Joseph, who was first elected in a 2014 special election, ran for re-election to a full term. He was originally set to face former City Councilman Jean Marcellus, who had previously run in the 2013 and 2014 elections. However, after qualifying ended, Marcellus was disqualified from the race after the $2,400 check he wrote to qualify for office was returned for insufficient funds. Accordingly, Joseph won his second term unopposed.

== General election ==
=== Candidates ===
- Smith Joseph, incumbent Mayor

==== Disqualified ====
- Jean Marcellus, former City Councilman, 2013 and 2014 candidate for Mayor

=== Results ===
Joseph faced no opponents and did not appear on the ballot.
