= 2024 North Miami mayoral election =

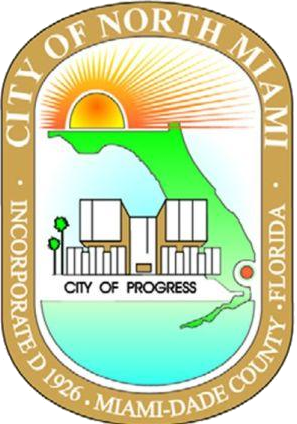
- November 5, 2024 (primary election); December 3, 2024 (runoff election)
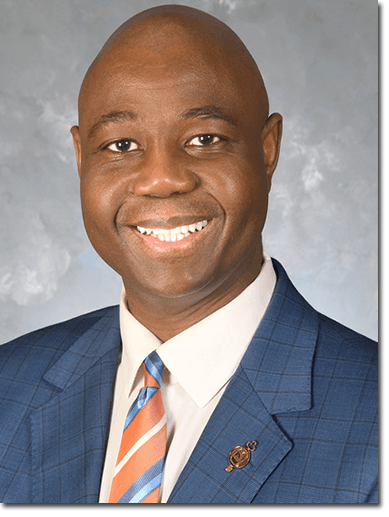

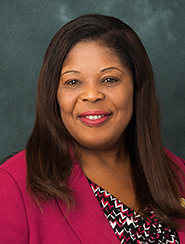

Candidate	Alix Desulme	Hector Medina
First round	7,226; 36.77%	4,450; 22.64%
Runoff	3,861; 67.61%	1,850; 32.39%
Candidate	Daphne Campbell	Naomi Blemur
First round	4,408; 22.43%	3,568; 18.16%
Runoff	Eliminated	Eliminated
Mayor before election
Alix Desulme
Nonpartisan
Elected mayor
Alix Desulme
Nonpartisan

The 2024 North Miami mayoral election took place on December 3, 2024, following a primary election on November 5, 2024. Following Mayor Philippe Bien-Aime's re-election in 2021, he resigned from office in 2022 to unsuccessfully run for County Commission. The City Council subsequently elected Vice Mayor Alix Desulme to serve out the remainder of Bien-Aime's term. The council also voted to reschedule its next municipal elections from May 2023 to November 2024, extending DeSulme's term to that point. A lawsuit challenging the election rescheduling was ultimately dismissed by Judge Reemberto Diaz of the Eleventh Judicial Circuit Court.

Desulme ran for a full term in the election. He was challenged by three opponents: former State Senator Daphne Campbell; Naomi Blemur, the 2022 Democratic nominee for Commissioner of Agriculture; and retired physician Hector Medina, who ran for Mayor unsuccessfully in 2017 and 2019. In the primary election, Desulme placed first with 37 percent of the vote, and Medina appeared to narrowly defeat Campbell for second place, defeating her by just 32 votes. A subsequent recount widened Medina's lead to 42 votes, and he proceeded to the runoff election against Desulme. Ultimately, Desulme defeated Medina in a landslide, winning re-election with 68 percent of the vote.

== Primary election ==
=== Candidates ===
- Alix Desulme, incumbent Mayor
- Hector Medina, retired physician, 2017 and 2019 candidate for Mayor
- Daphne Campbell, former State Senator
- Naomi Blemur, accountant, 2022 Democratic nominee for Commissioner of Agriculture

=== Results ===
Primary election results
Party	Candidate	Votes	%
Nonpartisan	Alix Desulme (inc.)	7,226	36.77%
Nonpartisan	Hector Medina	4,450	22.64%
Nonpartisan	Daphne Campbell	4,408	22.43%
Nonpartisan	Naomi Blemur	3,568	18.16%
Total votes		19,652	100.00%

== General election ==
=== Results ===
2024 North Miami mayoral election results
Party	Candidate	Votes	%
Nonpartisan	Alix Desulme (inc.)	3,861	67.61%
Nonpartisan	Hector Medina	1,850	32.39%
Total votes		5,711	100.00%
