= 2014 North Miami mayoral special election =

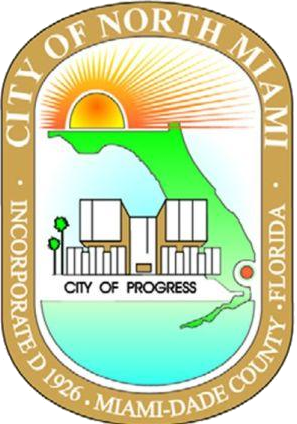
- August 26, 2014 (primary election); November 4, 2014 (general election)
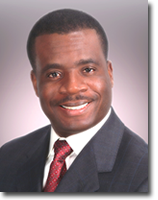

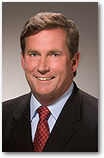

Candidate	Smith Joseph	Kevin Burns	Jean Marcellus
First round	2,782; 37.80%	3,305; 44.91%	1,272; 17.28%
Runoff	7,058; 54.36%	5,926; 45.64%	Eliminated
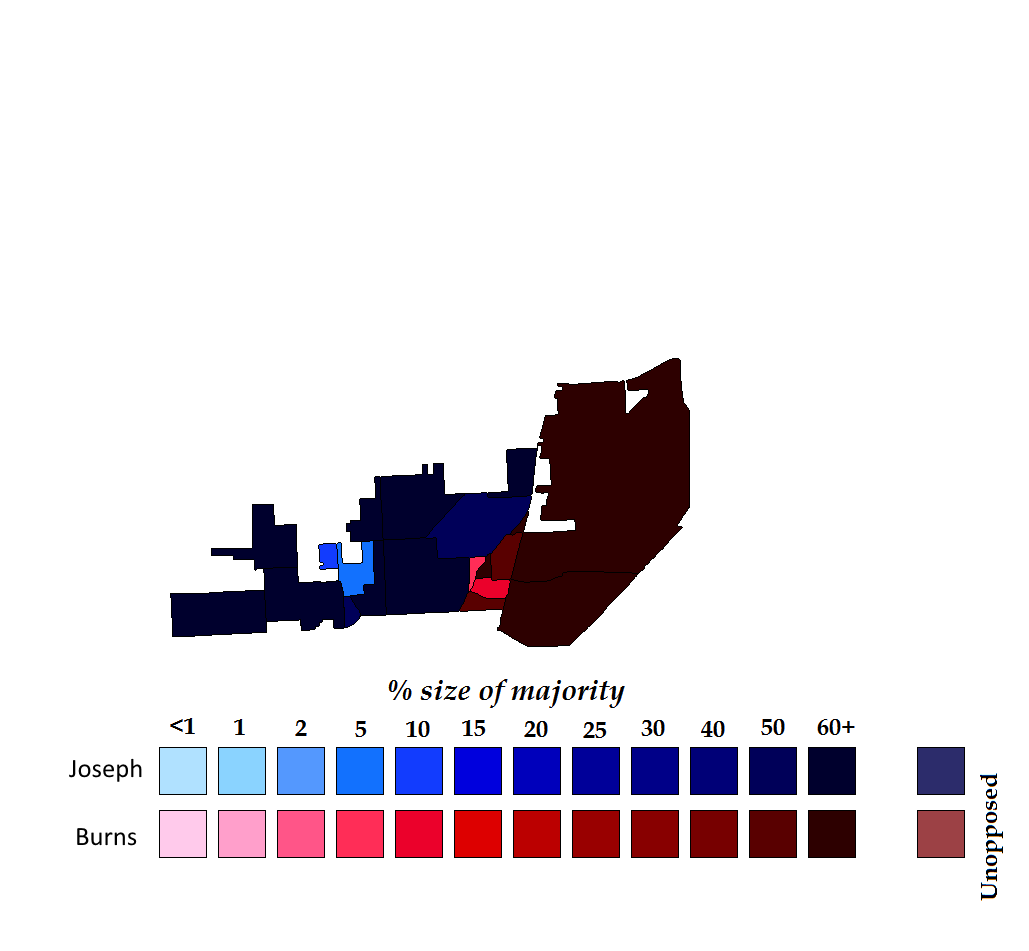
- Runoff election results by precinct
Mayor before election
Philippe Bien-Aime (acting)
Nonpartisan
Elected mayor
Smith Joseph
Nonpartisan

The 2014 North Miami mayoral special election took place on November 4, 2014, following a primary election on August 26, 2014. Following her victory in the 2013 election, Mayor Lucie Tondreau was indicted by federal prosecutors on charges relating to an $8 million mortgage fraud scheme. She was later suspended from office by Governor Rick Scott, and a special election was held to fill the remainder of her term in office.

Three candidates ran in the special election: former Mayor Kevin Burns, former City Councilman Jean Marcellus, and physician Smith Joseph, all of whom unsuccessfully ran in the previous mayoral election. In the primary election, Burns placed first, winning 45 percent of the vote, and advanced to a runoff election against Joseph, who placed second with 38 percent of vote. Joseph ultimately defeated Burns, 54–46 percent, and served out the remainder of Tondreau's term.

== Primary election ==
=== Candidates ===
- Kevin Burns, former Mayor
- Smith Joseph, physician
- Jean Marcellus, former City Councilman

=== Results ===
Primary election results
Party	Candidate	Votes	%
Nonpartisan	Kevin Burns	3,305	44.91%
Nonpartisan	Smith Joseph	2,782	37.80%
Nonpartisan	Jean Marcellus	1,272	17.28%
Total votes		7,359	100.00%

== General election ==
=== Results ===
2014 North Miami mayoral special election results
Party	Candidate	Votes	%
Nonpartisan	Smith Joseph	7,058	54.36%
Nonpartisan	Kevin Burns	5,926	45.64%
Total votes		12,984	100.00%
