= WRGP =

Radio station of Florida International University

Coordinates: 25.5404°N 80.4684°W

- Homestead, Florida; United States
- Broadcast area: South Florida metropolitan area
- Frequency: 88.1 MHz
- Branding: The Roar

Programming
- Format: College radio

Ownership
- Owner: Florida International University

History
- Founded: December 1988
- First air date: 1999
- Former call signs: WUFI (carrier current)
- Call sign meaning: "Radio of the Golden Panthers"

Technical information
- Licensing authority: FCC
- Facility ID: 21777
- Class: A
- ERP: 165 watts
- HAAT: 129 meters (423 ft)
- Translators: 95.3 W237CP (Miami); 96.9 W245BF (North Miami)

Links
- Public license information: Public file; LMS
- Website: panthernow.com/the-roar/

WRGP ("The Roar") is the student-run radio station of Florida International University (FIU) in Miami, Florida, United States. WRGP broadcasts on 88.1 MHz from a transmitter site in rural Miami-Dade County at 17107 SW 248 Street and from rebroadcasters on the two largest FIU campuses: W237CP (95.3 MHz) at the main Modesto A. Maidique Campus (formerly the University Park campus), where the station's studios are located in the Graham Center, and W245BF (96.9 MHz) on the Biscayne Bay Campus in North Miami.

== History ==
The first student radio station at Florida International University (FIU) was established in 1988 as a carrier current station on 540 KHz at the University Park campus, known as WUFI and primarily airing alternative rock. It emerged as a student government project.

In 1993, FIU applied to build an FM station on 88.1 MHz to transmit from Homestead, Florida. A construction permit was approved in 1995, and the station began airing in 1999 as WRGP "Radiate 88", having been delayed by paperwork with WTVJ (channel 6), which owned the tower from which the station broadcast; at launch, the station aired a more conventional contemporary hit radio format.

In 2004, the primary branding was changed by management to "Radio Golden Panther" (the original intended name, as it was the reason WRGP was selected as the call sign); in 2005, it reverted to Radiate FM. In early 2015, it was changed to "WRGP, FIU Student Radio" in an attempt to increase student awareness of the station. In 2017, the station rebranded as "The Roar".

Due to power limitations associated with the Homestead transmitter, WRGP was unable to provide effective coverage of the University Park campus or Miami area on 88.1 MHz. This was remedied in 2006 with the installation of an FM translator at University Park, rebroadcasting the station on 95.3 MHz. In February 2008, the reach of the station was further expanded when another translator on 96.9 MHz was installed at FIU's Biscayne Bay Campus of FIU in North Miami, providing improved coverage of the major FIU campuses and the metropolitan area.

In August 2026, FIU agreed to sell WRGP to the Christian broadcaster Hope Media Group for $152,500, followed the next month by an agreement to sell the translators to Strategic Media Holdings for $360,000.

== Programming ==
WRGP's programming focuses on independent artists from across all genres of music. Dedicated exclusively to this format and style, commercial and mainstream music receive no airplay on WRGP.

The music for non-specialty day-parts is furnished by the Entertainment Director at the behest of his or herself. As many as 300 unique artists and four times as many tracks make up the regular rotation of music played during non-specialty programming hours. This rotation of music is updated weekly and will often include older albums selected by the staff from the station archives for regular airplay. The format is designed to be flexible enough to allow DJs to pick their own music and to fill listener requests whenever possible. Unlike other stations, where rotation libraries are exclusively digitized, WRGP still relies on CDs and CD decks in the studio.

== Specialty programming ==
Each night of the week is dedicated to a particular genre of music, although constantly changing, is produced entirely by specialty DJs who operate independently. These DJs furnish their own music for these programs and are not bound by the formatics of other day-parts.

== Community service ==
As a non-commercial educational radio station, WRGP airs public service announcements in lieu of commercial advertising and carries locally produced news updates provided by its in-house news department. In the event of a Hurricane Warning, the station switches over to NOAA Weather Radio station KHB34 during the duration of the storm until it has passed over.

== Sports ==
WRGP also carries extensive live coverage of FIU Golden Panthers athletics with its own staff of announcers and analysts. The station has covered both several Sun Belt tournaments across varying sports as well as both of FIU's Bowl game appearances. As of 2012, WRGP is the only station on terrestrial radio that carries FIU football, basketball and baseball.

== Structure ==
The content aired on WRGP is done so entirely at the discretion of the station staff. While licensed to the FIU Board of Trustees, funded by the Student Government Association and overseen by a media adviser, the radio station operates as an autonomous entity within the university. The station staff is made up entirely of FIU students. At any time, WRGP may have as many as 80 live DJs filling the day-parts in shifts that range from 1 to 3 hours of airtime.

A General Manager is voted upon yearly by the FIU Media Board, which is a committee made up of university staff and local media professionals. The GM is ultimately responsible for all station operations including staffing and budgetary matters. The GM appoints and oversees an immediate staff of directors who administer the music, programming, training, promotions, news, sports and engineering departments.

== Translators ==
In addition to the main station, 88.1, WRGP is relayed by additional translators to widen its broadcast area.

Call sign	Frequency	City of license	FID	ERP (W)	Class	FCC info
W237CP	95.3 FM	Miami, Florida	144469	70	D	LMS
W245BF	96.9 FM	North Miami, Florida	144438	99	D	LMS

== See also ==
- Campus radio
- List of college radio stations in the United States
