= 2019 North Miami mayoral election =

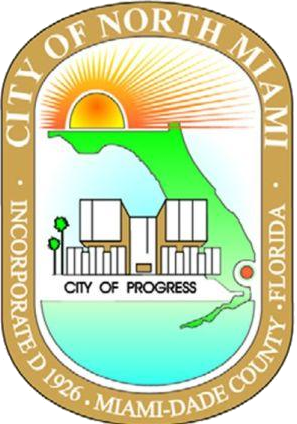
- May 14, 2019
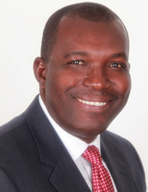

Candidate	Philippe Bien-Aime	Mac-Kinley Lauriston	Hector Medina
Party	Nonpartisan	Nonpartisan	Nonpartisan
Popular vote	3,167	1,754	874
Percentage	51.94%	28.76%	14.33%
Mayor before election
Smith Joseph
Nonpartisan
Elected mayor
Philippe Bien-Aime
Nonpartisan

The 2019 North Miami mayoral election took place on May 14, 2019. Incumbent Mayor Smith Joseph was term-limited and unable to seek re-election to a third term. Four candidates ran to succeed him: Vice Mayor Philippe Bien-Aime; Mac-Kinley Lauriston, the chief of staff to County Commissioner Jean Monestime; former mayoral candidate Danielle Beauvais, and retired physician Hector Medina.

During the campaign, Bien-Aime was sued by a former staffer for sexual assault and harassment. He denied the allegations as "fabricated and untrue," and the lawsuit was later settled by the city out of court.

Despite the scandal, Bien-Aime won the election by a wide margin, winning 52 percent of the vote and avoiding the need for a runoff election.

== General election ==
=== Candidates ===
- Philippe Ben-Aime, City Councilman
- Mac-Kinley Lauriston, Chief of Staff to County Commissioner Jean Monestime
- Hector Medina, retired physician, 2017 candidate for Mayor
- Danielle Beauvais, 2005 and 2017 candidate for Mayor

=== Results ===
2019 North Miami mayoral election results
Party	Candidate	Votes	%
Nonpartisan	Philippe Ben-Aime	3,167	51.94%
Nonpartisan	Mac-Kinley Lauriston	1,754	28.76%
Nonpartisan	Hector Medina	874	14.33%
Nonpartisan	Danielle Beauvais	303	4.97%
Total votes		6,098	100.00%
