= Hospitality Review =

International Hospitality Review
- Discipline: Tourism, management
- Language: English
- Edited by: Jinlin Zhao

Publication details
- Former name(s): FIU Hospitality Review
- History: 1983-present
- Publisher: Florida International University School of Hospitality & Tourism Management (United States)
- Frequency: Biannual

Standard abbreviations
- ISO 4: Hosp. Rev.

Indexing
- ISSN: 0739-7011
- LCCN: 87655590
- OCLC no.: 613838906

Links
- Journal homepage; Online archive

The International Hospitality Review is a biannual peer-reviewed academic journal covering the hospitality and tourism fields. It is published by the Florida International University School of Hospitality & Tourism Management. The editor-in-chief is Jinlin Zhao.
