= Arch Creek, Florida =

Historic site in the U.S. state of Florida

Arch Creek Park
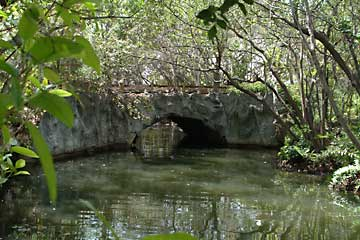
- Arch Creek natural limestone bridge was the site of an early settlement in Miami-Dade County
- Interactive map of Arch Creek Park
- Type: Municipal
- Location: Miami, Miami-Dade County, Florida, United States
- Area: 9.4 acres (38,000 m^{2})
- Created: 1982
- Operator: Miami-Dade County Parks and Recreation Department
- Arch Creek Historic and Archeological Site
- U.S. National Register of Historic Places
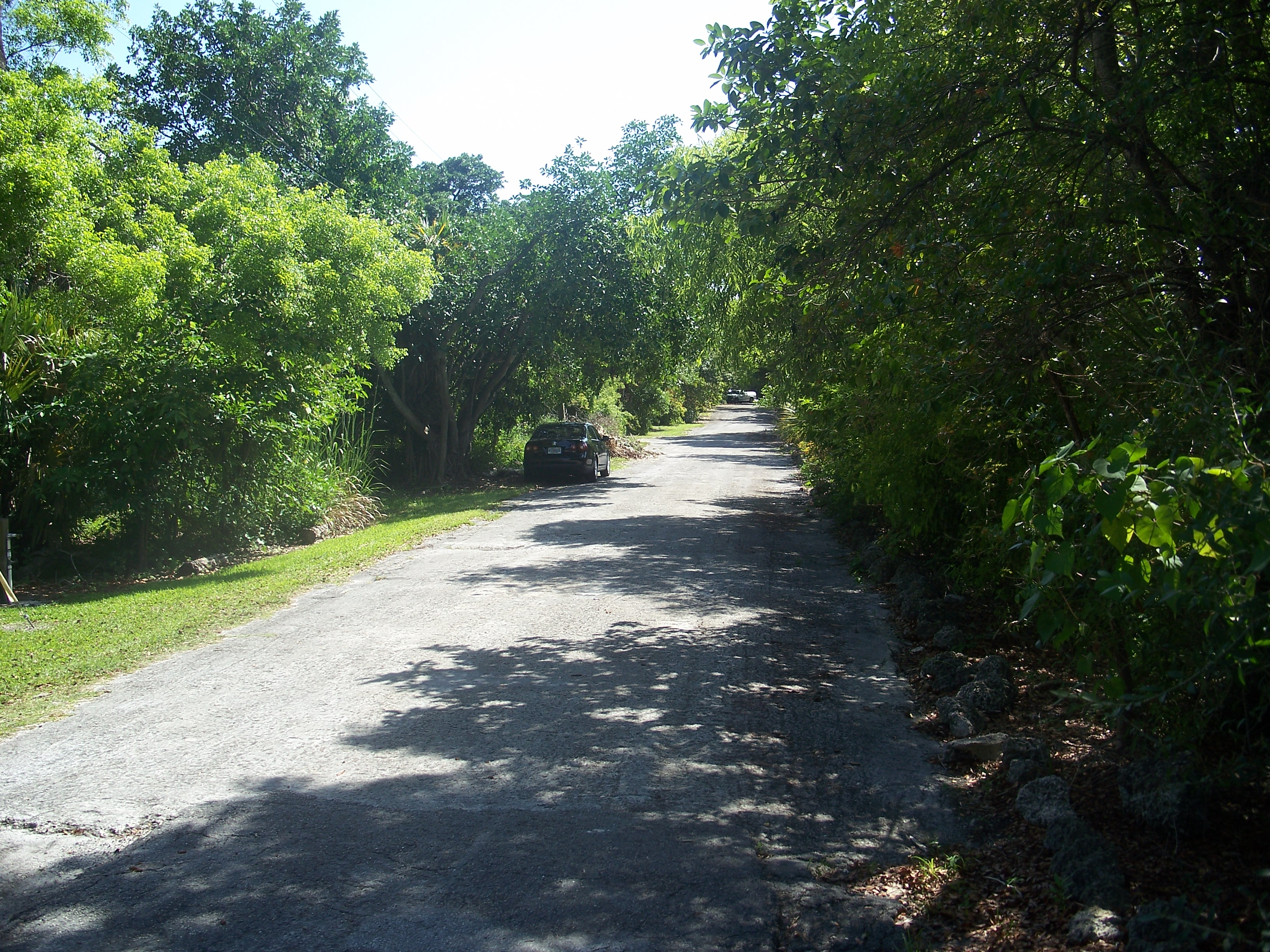

- Location within Miami Location within Florida Location within the United States
- Location: Miami, Miami-Dade County, Florida, USA
- Nearest city: North Miami, Florida
- Coordinates: 25°54′04″N 80°09′41″W
- NRHP reference No.: 86001700
- Added to NRHP: July 15, 1986

Arch Creek was an early settlement in Miami-Dade County, Florida, in present-day metropolitan Miami. Tequesta Indians thrived here before the first Europeans arrived in the early 16th century. The name is derived from the 40 feet (12 m) long natural limestone bridge that spanned the creek until 1973. It is part of the Arch Creek Memorial Park at 1855 Northeast 135th Street, on Biscayne Boulevard. It was added to the U.S. National Register of Historic Places on July 15, 1986.

== History ==
The Arch Creek area was inhabited by indigenous peoples for centuries prior to European colonization. Among them were the Tequesta people.

During the Seminole Wars, General Abner Doubleday (often erroneously credited with inventing baseball) blazed a trail between Fort Lauderdale and Fort Dallas on the Miami River. This military trail crossed over the limestone bridge, traversing the freshwater creek flowing from the Everglades to Biscayne Bay. In 1895, Henry Flagler's railroad reached Arch Creek as it expanded southward, bringing a steady stream of visitors and settlers, largely from east coast states.

The first European-American families to settle the area planted tomatoes and pineapples. A railroad depot was established in 1903. Soon after, a packing plant, a sawmill, a post office and a school were erected as the town began to grow. By 1910, the area was a popular place for tourists and community gatherings. The "shell house" sold souvenirs, postcards and refreshments. On weekends, families from many miles away would attend barbecues with as many as 500 people. "Dad" Wiggins, the self-proclaimed best barbecue chef in Florida, would start slow-cooking large amounts of meat and families would bring baked goods, side dishes and desserts while kids played along the banks of the creek. By 1912, the community included eighteen homes, a church, a general store, a blacksmith shop, and two tomato-packing houses.

By 1920, the population of Arch Creek had grown to 307. The Biscayne Canal was dug in 1924 to reduce flooding of local farmland. During the Florida land boom of the 1920s, portions of the community were subdivided and sold to northern tourists as residential lots. On February 5, 1926, the incorporated Town of Miami Shores was established by a vote of 38 registered voters. A destructive hurricane in September 1926 brought land sales to a halt. However, proceeds of a $287,000 bond issue were used to build a new city hall in 1928. The Arch Creek school burned down in 1927 and was replaced in 1928 by the W.J. Bryan school, which is still in operation. The town kept the name of "Miami Shores" until 1931. In 1952 it was incorporated into the City of North Miami.

In 1957, the first of many threats against the future of the natural bridge materialized. The bridge was endangered by a plan to drain low-lying areas as part of a flood prevention program. The Army Corps of Engineers wanted to blow up the bridge, or re-route the creek. A 1957 newspaper article announced that "the bridge must be sacrificed for better drainage of the area." Protests from members of the local Audubon Society, the Historical Association of Southern Florida and the Dade Conservation Council prevented any of this destructive action.

Things remained quiet until the 1970s, when Arch Creek became the property of the Chrysler Corporation. Their plans called for the construction of an automobile showroom and a new and used car agency. In 1972, Chrysler requested a zoning change from the City of North Miami, which would have allowed them to pave the area and build a garage on the property. Vigorous opposition came from the Tropical Audubon Society, the Miami-West Indian Archaeological Society, the Keystone Point Homeowners' Association, and members of the Arch Creek Trust. After almost a year of intense lobbying, the State of Florida agreed to purchase the land and designate it a state park. The State's Land Acquisition Trust allocated $822,000 to buy 7.9 acres (32,000 m^{2}) of property east of the creek.

A group of local citizens, who later formed the Arch Creek Trust, went to Tallahassee in February 1973, to finalize the agreement. On the night they returned, the natural bridge collapsed and fell into the creek. Rumors of sabotage ran through the community, and the Metro-Dade Police Bomb Squad was called out. Nothing suggestive of sabotage was discovered, and experts generally agreed later that the fall was probably due to constant vibrations from passing trains, or erosion, or just old age and decay. In the years that followed, there were various efforts to restore the bridge, clear the property of trash and save additional land in the area.

The porous oolitic (pronounced oh-a-li-tic) limestone bridge was laced with roots from the oak trees growing on both banks of the creek, and it is likely those roots were holding the rock together. A number of trees near both ends of the bridge had been removed prior to the collapse, thus killing the roots. Then in order to keep vehicular traffic from using the bridge, it was blocked off by boring a row of large holes through the road at both ends of the bridge and standing discarded wooden railroad ties in the holes. When the bridge collapsed it broke along the two rows of "perforations" drilled for the ties. In March 2018, Florida International University's Biscayne Bay Campus proposed to pave a new crossing as an additional road access to cars and allow another way to campus for first responders in case of an emergency, in light of the Parkland school shooting. However, despite the proposal passing in the Florida Senate, it has faced strong protests from people who want to protect the reserve.

== Arch Creek Park Museum & Nature Center ==
In 1978 Dade County leased the land from the State of Florida and began making plans to turn it into a passive recreation facility. Clean-up crews appeared, and construction started on a small museum and nature study center. A nature trail was constructed in the hammock area by the Youth Conservation Corps. In addition, they planted over 500 trees. The Arch Creek Park was formally dedicated on April 25, 1982. Today, Arch Creek is an 9.4-acre (38,000 m^{2}) site at the junction of N.E. 135th Street and Biscayne Boulevard, and offers many opportunities for botanical, historical and archaeological study. It has a museum/nature center modeled after an early Florida pioneer home, displaying Indian artifacts dug from the grounds, and live animals from the nearby hammock. Remains of the original coontie mill are still visible across the creek, and the Park exists as the only preserved archaeological site in the County.

In 1992, Arch Creek Trust and the Trust for Public Lands worked to acquire an additional 1.5 acres (6,100 m^{2}) at the northern end of the park, bringing the total size of the park to 9.4 acres (38,000 m^{2}). Funding was provided by the Environmentally Endangered Lands (EEL) Program. In 1994 the park received a grant to add a Butterfly Garden on this new site, using native butterfly-attracting plants.

There are year-round activities at the park. Guided trail walks are held on the weekends, and many Miami-Dade County students visit on a regular basis.

== Bibliography ==
- Arch Creek Trust members. Arch Creek Trust Historical Notes.
- Peters, Thelma (1981). Biscayne Country.
- Burr, Robert Adams. Burr Family History.
