= Shooting of Charles Kinsey =

Shooting of mental health therapist by police

- Cellphone video footage, showing mental health therapist Charles Kinsey lying on the ground with his arms raised in North Miami, Florida, before being shot by police officer Jonathan Aledda. Kinsey's autistic patient is seated beside him.
- Location: 25.892661°N 80.170422°W; Northeast 127th Street and 14th Avenue, North Miami, Florida, U.S.
- Date: July 18, 2016; 10 years ago 5:45 p.m. (EST)
- Attack type: Police shooting
- Injuries: Charles Kinsey - right leg
- Victim: Charles Kinsey
- Perpetrator: Jonathan Aledda (officer of the North Miami Police Department)
- Charges: Felony attempted manslaughter (2 counts); Culpable negligence (2 counts)
- Verdict: First trial: Not guilty of one count of culpable negligence; Hung jury on remaining counts; Second trial: Not guilty of two counts of felony attempted manslaughter; Guilty of one count of culpable negligence
- Convictions: Culpable negligence (overturned in 2022)
- Sentence: 1 year probation (reduced to 5 months) and 100 hours' community service

On July 18, 2016, Charles Kinsey, a behavior therapist, was shot in the leg by a police officer in North Miami, Florida United States. Kinsey had been retrieving his 27-year-old autistic patient, Arnaldo Rios Soto, who had run away from his group home. Police encountered the pair while they were searching for an armed suicidal man. Kinsey was lying on the ground with his hands in the air, and trying to negotiate between officers and his patient, when he was shot. The officer who shot Kinsey said he had been aiming at the patient, who the officer believed was threatening Kinsey with a gun. Both Kinsey and his patient were unarmed.

Following the shooting, Kinsey said he was handcuffed and left bleeding on the ground for 20 minutes without police giving him medical aid. The incident received significant media attention following the appearance of cellphone video footage. The officer who shot Kinsey, Jonathan Aledda, was arrested in 2017, and charged with attempted manslaughter and negligence. In June 2019, Aledda was found guilty by a jury of culpable negligence. One day after being found guilty, Aledda was also fired from the police force. He was sentenced to probation and required to write a 2,500 word essay on policing. He ultimately completed a total of five months of probation and no prison time. After Aledda was found guilty, Kinsey and the City of North Miami reached a settlement for an undisclosed amount in a federal lawsuit Kinsey had filed. In February 2022, Aledda's conviction was overturned.

== Background ==
On July 18, 2016, shortly before 5:00 p.m. EDT, Arnaldo Rios Soto, a 27-year-old non-verbal patient with severe autism and an IQ of 40, ran away from his mental health facility, MacTown Panther Group Homes. He took with him a silver toy truck. Charles Kinsey, a 47-year-old mental health worker, followed his patient out of the facility to retrieve him. Kinsey had worked at the facility for over a year, was involved in community efforts to keep local kids in school, and is the father of five children. According to NPR, Kinsey has been a member of the local "Circle of Brotherhood" group whose mission is "Serving and Protecting our Community".

The police were at the same time responding to reports of a man threatening to shoot himself in the area, at Northeast 127th Street and 14th Avenue. Police received a call around 5:30 p.m. The North Miami Assistant Police Chief, Neal Cuevas, said that the autistic man did not comply with orders when the police arrived on the scene.

== Shooting ==
While Kinsey lay on the ground with his hands raised, one officer, North Miami Police Department Special Weapons and Tactics (SWAT) team member Jonathan Aledda, who was 152 feet (46 m) away, said he thought the patient was holding the therapist hostage and that the small silver toy truck being clutched by the patient was a gun, following a report made by a passing female motorist, at whom the patient had pointed the toy truck which the motorist believed appeared to be a firearm, and a dispatch to the police officers that there was a "male with a gun". Aledda said "It appeared he [the black therapist] was screaming for mercy or for help or something. In my mind, the white male [the patient] had a gun. I couldn't hear what the black man was saying. In my mind, I thought he might get shot." Aledda said he had not aimed at Kinsey, but rather had been aiming at Rios-Soto, who he believed was threatening the therapist with a gun. Aledda fired three .223 caliber rounds from his Colt M4 Carbine rifle, which did not have advanced optical sights, with one bullet striking Kinsey in the right leg. The shooting occurred a block from the group home where Kinsey worked at 1365 NE 128th St.

Kinsey's lawyer Hilton Napoleon II provided the Miami Herald with a cellphone video of Kinsey lying on the ground, his hands in the air, moments before the shooting. The man who took the video initially thought that the patient had a gun in his hands. In the video Kinsey asks police not to shoot him, while his patient plays with his toy truck. Kinsey said he was trying to convince his patient, who was clutching a small toy truck, to obey officers' commands. The video also shows Kinsey telling police that he is unarmed. In the video Kinsey is seen telling police, "All he has is a toy truck. A toy truck. I am a behavior therapist at a group home." Kinsey is also shown telling his patient, "Please be still...lay down on your stomach." While two of his fellow officers were close enough to hear what Kinsey was saying, the shooting officer was not.

Kinsey said that after he was shot, police turned him on his back, handcuffed him, and left him bleeding on the road for 20 minutes, and that police did nothing to stop Kinsey's bleeding before an ambulance arrived. A second video shows officers carrying rifles and patting down Kinsey and his patient while they lie on the ground.

== Aftermath ==
A witness to the shooting told the Associated Press that when police arrived, he grabbed binoculars and saw that the autistic man seated in the road, next to Kinsey, was holding a toy truck. He informed an officer that the man was holding a toy and not a gun, but she told him to back up and did not inform other officers. Kinsey was shot shortly afterwards.

One officer, about 15–20 feet (5–6 m) away, heard Kinsey yelling and said over the radio to "use caution" because "the person advised that it's a toy." A minute later, at least 30 seconds before shots were fired, that officer said over the radio to the other police officers at the scene that he had a visual, and that the item did not appear to him to be a firearm, but appeared to be a toy truck.

Kinsey said he was more worried about his patient, who did not have his hands raised, and did not believe he himself would be shot. "As long as I've got my hands up, they're not gonna shoot me, that's what I'm thinking," Kinsey said. "Wow, I was wrong."

Kinsey said that being shot "was so surprising, it was like a mosquito bite." He said that when he was shot his life flashed before his eyes, and he thought of his family. According to Kinsey, when he asked the officer why he had shot him, the officer replied, "I don't know." Kinsey's lawyer said that when another officer asked the shooting officer "why did you shoot this guy", the shooter again responded, "I don't know." Kinsey survived the shooting after being taken to Jackson Memorial Hospital. Kinsey's wife said, "I'm just grateful he's alive and able to tell his story."

Following the shooting, the name of the police officer who shot Kinsey was not immediately revealed to the public. Police later announced that the shooter was a 30-year-old Hispanic officer who had worked in the police department for four years, and was a member of the SWAT team. Miami police subsequently identified the officer as Jonathan Aledda.

A police department employee told the Herald that the officer fired because the autistic patient did not obey police commands. On July 22, the local president of the Florida Police Benevolent Association chapter in Dade County, John Rivera, said that the officer who fired the bullets was aiming for Kinsey's patient, and was "trying to save Kinsey's life." Rivera said that Kinsey "did everything right." In response, Napoleon and some media outlets questioned the explanation that Kinsey was shot accidentally, and asked why Kinsey was handcuffed and left bleeding on the ground after being shot.

A second officer was initially placed on administrative leave, but prosecutors then found that the officer had not lied when he told investigators he didn't witness the shooting, because he had in fact returned to a police cruiser when the shot was fired.

Police announced that the Miami-Dade State Attorney's Office would assist with an ongoing investigation. An inquiry into the shooting was performed by the Florida Department of Law Enforcement, at the request of both North Miami police and the state attorney's office.

== Legal proceedings ==
On August 3, 2016, Kinsey filed a federal lawsuit against Jonathan Aledda, claiming he violated his civil rights and used excessive force and falsely arrested him. In his complaint, Kinsey stated that Aledda violated his Fourth Amendment right to be free from excessive force during police seizures when he shot him in the leg. He also stated that Aledda put handcuffs on him that were too tight, cutting off his circulation.

On April 12, 2017, Jonathan Aledda was arrested on charges of attempted manslaughter and negligence for his role in the affair.

On June 15, 2017, Rios Soto's family filed a lawsuit against North Miami on his behalf alleging the police falsely imprisoned him and intentionally inflicted pain and suffering. A confidential settlement was reached in 2019.

In March 2019, the case was declared a mistrial as the jury could not reach a verdict on all charges. The jurors voted to acquit Aledda of one misdemeanor count of culpable negligence for shooting at Rios Soto. However they could not reach a decision on the three remaining charges, one of misdemeanor culpable negligence for his shot at Kinsey, and two charges of felony attempted manslaughter.

In June 2019, Jonathan Aledda was retried and found not guilty on two counts of attempted manslaughter (felony charges) but guilty of culpable negligence, a misdemeanor. He was not sentenced to prison, and was instead sentenced to one year of administrative probation, 100 hours of community service, and to write a 2,500-word essay on communication and weapon discharges. His conviction would also not appear on a criminal record due to the withholding of adjudication. He completed his probation five months later.

After Aledda’s sentencing, Charles Kinsey and the City of North Miami reached a settlement for an undisclosed amount in the federal suit Kinsey had filed against the city and its police.

In February 2022, his conviction was overturned by Florida's Third District Court of Appeals who ruled the trial court erred by not allowing Aledda to introduce how he was trained to respond to similar encounters.

== Reactions ==
After the release of the video, Florida Congresswoman Frederica Wilson tweeted that she was shocked and angered by Kinsey's shooting, writing, "Like everyone else I have one question: Why?" Mayor Smith Joseph apologized to the family and promised a complete investigation stating "I have made it clear that I will not tolerate anything that goes against the process."

On Thursday after the shooting, Black Lives Matter activists protested outside the North Miami police department, stating that it was Kinsey who was "protecting and serving" in the incident, and confronting police officials. Protestors demanded that the shooting officer be fired.

NPR wrote that the incident "has renewed discussions of officers' use of force".

Abroad, France TV wrote that while the incident could have ended far more tragically, it was "no less absurd and worrisome", calling the event "surreal". Le Figaro wrote that the story broke at a time when the United States has been "plagued by intense controversy following the death of several black people shot by police, and attacks on five policemen."
