= FIU Chaplin School of Hospitality & Tourism Management =

- Type: Public
- Established: 1972
- Parent institution: Florida International University
- Dean: Michael Cheng
- Students: 1,204 (Spring 2024)
- Location: North Miami, Florida, United States; 25.911244°N 80.138111°W
- Campus: Biscayne Bay Campus
- Website: hospitality.fiu.edu
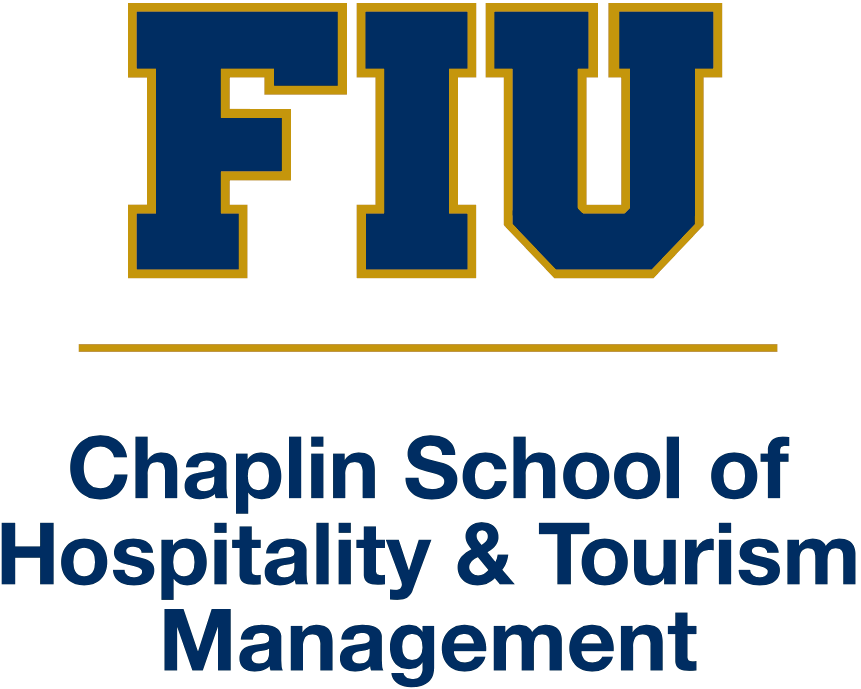

The Chaplin School of Hospitality & Tourism Management at Florida International University, located at the Biscayne Bay Campus in North Miami, Florida in the United States is one of the University's 26 schools and colleges. The University was chartered in 1965 and opened in 1972.

The campus includes a natural mangrove preserve, direct access to the bay, apartment-style housing, library, aquatic center, and the Roz and Cal Kovens Conference Center. On-campus housing is available at the Bayview Housing.

== Admissions ==
FIU’s Chaplin School of Hospitality & Tourism Management has been recognized as one of the top hospitality programs in the country, with more than 1,200 undergraduate and graduate students per year.

Undergraduate and graduate applicants are required to submit an application for admission to the University and to follow admission procedures stated on its Admissions website. In order to be approved for entrance into the School, applicants must first be eligible for admission into the University.

The School is accredited by the following: Commission on Colleges of the Southern Association of Colleges and Schools (SACS).

== Degrees ==
The School offers flexible study options with its variety of degrees in Hotel, Restaurant, Hospitality, Travel and Tourism specializations available both on campus and fully online.

=== Undergraduate ===
- Bachelor of Science in Hospitality Management
  - Beverage Management
  - Events & Entertainment Management
  - Food Innovations & Entrepreneurship
  - Hotel/Lodging Management
  - Restaurant & Culinary Management
  - Travel & Tourism Management
- Bachelor of Arts in Global Sustainable Tourism
- Combined Bachelor of Science & Master in Science in Hospitality Management (4+1) Program
- One Year Certificate in Hospitality Management

=== Graduate ===
- Master of Science in Hospitality Management (non-thesis and thesis)
  - Specialization in Hospitality Real Estate Development
  - Specialization in Mega Events
  - Specialization in Revenue Management
  - Specialization in Cruise Line Operations
- Mixed Mode MS @ Wynwood
- Executive Master of Science in Hospitality Management

== Facilities ==
The school is located on the Biscayne Bay Campus, which is about 200 acres (809,000 m^{2}).
