= Josaphat Celestin =

American politician

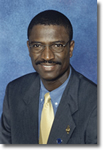

Mayor of North Miami, Florida
- In office 2001–2005
- Preceded by: Frank Wolland
- Succeeded by: Kevin Burns

Personal details
- Born: August 11, 1956 (age 70) Port-au-Prince, Haiti
- Party: Republican

Josaphat J. Celestin, also known as Joe Celestin, is an American politician who served as the mayor of North Miami, Florida from 2001 to 2005. A Republican, he was the first Haitian-American mayor of a sizable city in the United States.

Celestin was born in Port-au-Prince, Haiti to a physician and emigrated to the United States in 1979.

== Political career ==
In 1996, Celestin ran for the Florida Legislature, but did not succeed. In 1997, he formed the Haitian-American Political Action Committee (HAPAC). In 1998, he ran for the Florida Senate, but was not successful. He sued to overturn the election, claiming that the results were tainted by illegally registered voters.

Prior to his 2001 election as mayor, Celestin had also run for mayor in 1999.

In 2001, Celestin was elected as Mayor of North Miami, becoming the first Haitian-American mayor of a sizeable US city. He was re-elected in 2003 when the deadline for opponents passed with no challengers. He left office in 2005 due to term limits.

In 2009, Celestin had considered running for mayor again, but pulled out so as not to be 'divisive'.

In 2011 he ran for the State Senate for the position vacated by Frederica Wilson, who replaced Kendrick Meek in the U.S. House of Representatives. On March 1, 2011, he was defeated by Democrat Oscar Braynon. In 2016, he stated he would likely not vote for Donald Trump despite his partisan affiliation.
