= North Miami Public Library =

Public library in Florida, United States

Coordinates: 25.897276°N 80.181838°W

- Location: 835 Northeast 132 Street, North Miami, FL 33161, United States
- Type: Public
- Established: 1932

Other information
- Director: Paul Bazile
- Website: www.northmiamifl.gov/207/Library

The North Miami Public Library is a public library in North Miami, Florida. The library has a diverse collection of over 60,000 items, which include fiction and non-fiction books, magazines, newspapers, videos, audio books and discs, compact discs, and DVDs for adults, teens, and children. A bilingual and multi-cultural staff provides a variety of services and programs.

== History ==
The North Miami Library started services in 1932 in City Hall of the town of North Miami, Florida, by the Biscayne Park Woman's Club. The library was directed under the supervision of E. May Avil, who served 37 years as City Clerk for North Miami, Florida. The library was mostly funded through donation and membership fees. In 1948 the Biscayne Park Woman's Club transferred the library under the authority of the town of North Miami, and in 1949 the library became a free public library funded and administered under the Florida Statutes. Mrs. Edla Lunden and Mrs. Alma Anderson were appointed Librarian and Librarian Assistant. The North Miami town council transferred its property to the library in 1952.

In 1960, the library moved and expanded to two storefronts at the corner of NE 19th Avenue and NE 169th Street. The city severed its relationship with the City of Miami's Library system in 1961 to form an independent library with a staff of two and a budget of $25,000. In 1964 North Miami Beach voters passed a bond issue to build a permanent library structure. The city dedicated the 10,000 square foot stone and wood facility in 1965. The new library opened its doors with 6,000 volumes for the reading of 4,000 registered cardholders. By the building's tenth anniversary in February 1976, the library had grown to 46,000 volumes and 10,000 cardholders. A 1981 addition expanded the library to 11,200 square feet.

The library's first professional librarian was Phyllis Gray, who served from 1955 to 1959. Succeeding Gray was Julia Wanner who completed an addition of the building that doubled it in size in 1964. The library operated a branch on the west side of the city from 1957 to 1967. In 1970 the city council renamed the library as the E. May Avil North Miami Public Library. In 1978 Mrs. Gloria Zavish succeeded Mrs. Wanner and became the director of the library. The library continued to expand with the construction and furnishing of a $1.3 million addition completed in early 1991, increasing the structure to its current size of over 23,000 square feet.

Every Halloween since 1969, a pumpkin has been impaled onto the spire of North Miami Public Library by a group named Coxie's Army. This has become a celebrated tradition, and is often accompanied by the hanging of a poem at the library's entrance.

== Friends of the Library ==
The Library also benefits from the support of the Friends of the North Miami Public Library, a civic minded group of people who know that quality library service is important to their community. As a group, Friends strive to support, improve and promote the Library. The Friends promote the Library be enlisting public support for various Library activities, by informing the public of library services, by raising money to purchase books and equipment for the Library, and by advocating for political and financial support. Anyone interested in supporting the library is encouraged to join.

== Library Services ==
The library offers several services available to the public which include citizenship materials, passport services, computers, copy and fax machines, employment resources, meeting rooms, early literacy programs for children, a teen advisory, varied interest programs for all ages, study rooms, and voter registration forms.

== Library Card Information ==
There is no charge for a Library Card for North Miami residents or for people who own business or property in North Miami. Residents of Hialeah, North Miami Beach and the Miami-Dade Public Library System Special Taxing District enjoy Reciprocal borrowing privileges. All others will be charged a nonresident fee of $50.00 annually and A three (3) month card is available for $15.00.

== Online Resources ==
The North Miami Public Library offers a variety of online resources. Online resources include platforms such as The Florida Electronic Library, Mango Languages, Ask A Librarian, A To Z USA, Coursera, Khan Academy, and Digital Public Library of America.

== Library Board Information ==
The Library has a 5-member Advisory Board appointed by the Mayor and City Council. Library Board members serve a 2-year term. Call the Library for dates and times for Library Board meetings.

Library Board members serve as a liaison between the community and Library, setting policy and making recommendations to improve Library services. For more info, contact the Library at 305-891-5535.
