= Lucie Tondreau =

American politician and activist

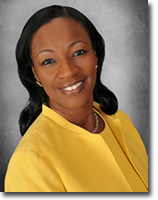

Mayor of North Miami, Florida
- In office 2013–2014
- Preceded by: Andre Pierre
- Succeeded by: Philippe Bien-Aime (Acting); Smith Joseph (elected)

Personal details
- Born: 1959 or 1960 (age 66–67) Haiti
- Party: Democratic

Lucie Tondreau (born 1959/1960) is an American politician and social and immigrant activist who served as the first female and the third Haitian-American mayor of North Miami, Florida

== Biography ==
Tondreau was born in Haiti but moved to Montreal, Canada in 1967 when she was seven. In 1981, she moved to New York City where she became active in the Haitian community. In 1984, she moved to Miami where she worked with the Haitian Refugee Center and served as a board member of the Haitian American Community of Dade County (HACAD), the Metropolitan Planning Organization, the Florida Commission on the Status of Women, the Haitian-American Grassroots Coalition, the Miami Art in Public Places, and the Haitian Political Action Committee. In 1999, she founded the public relations firm, Tondreau & Associates. She worked as radio personality.

She was one of two finalists in the non-partisan 2013 North Miami mayoral election, a city where 1/3rd of the population was Haitian-American. On June 4, 2013, Tondreau was elected after a runoff election between her and former mayor Kevin Burns. On May 21, 2014, she was suspended as Mayor of North Miami after allegations of mortgage fraud. Vice Mayor Philippe Bien-Aime was named acting mayor.
