= 2017 North Miami mayoral election =

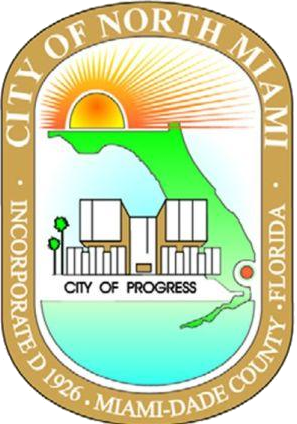
- May 9, 2017
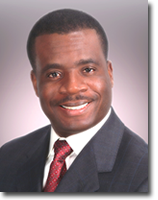

Candidate	Smith Joseph	Hector Medina	Danielle Beauvais
Party	Nonpartisan	Nonpartisan	Nonpartisan
Popular vote	2,515	728	669
Percentage	59.84%	17.32%	15.92%
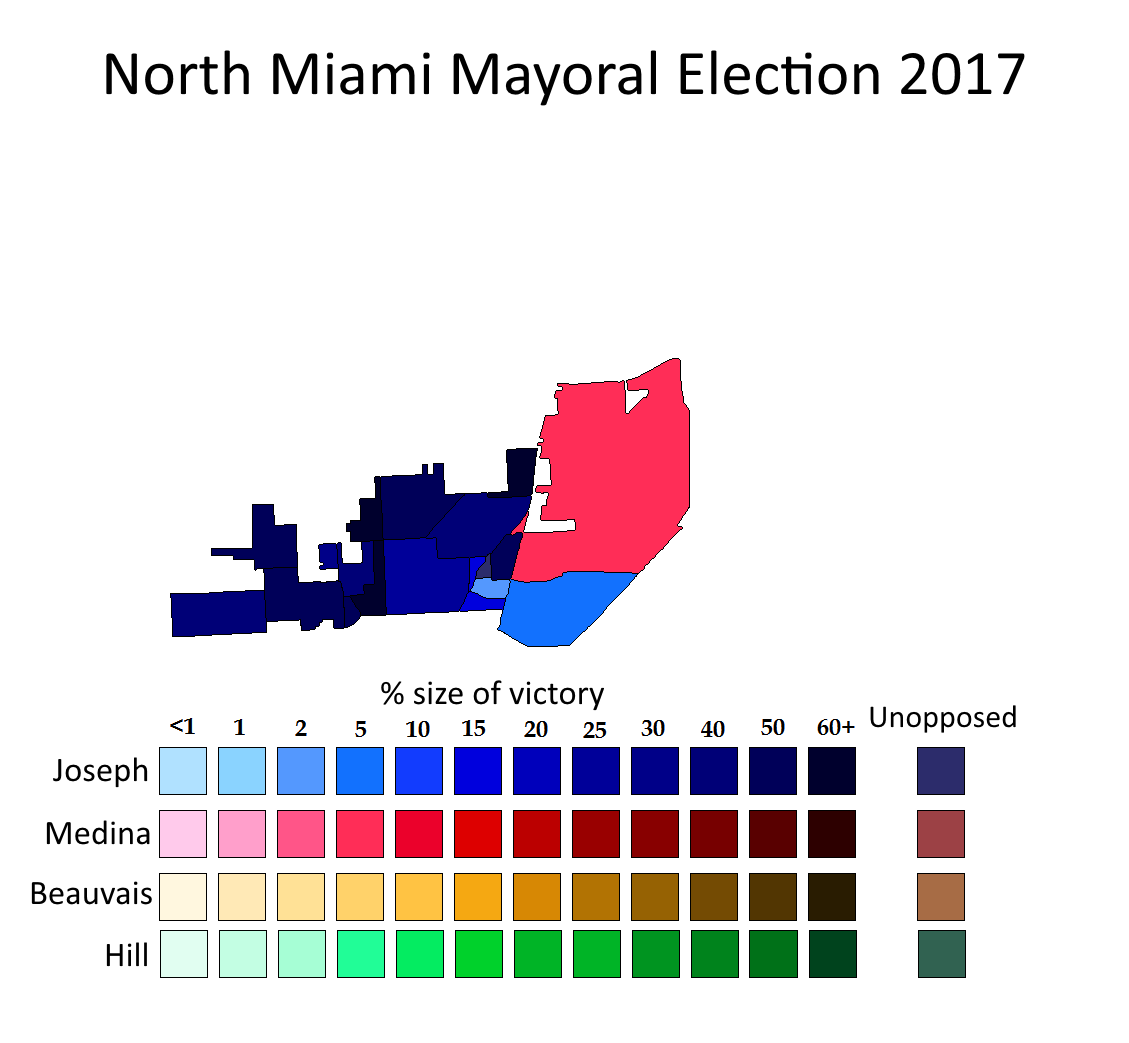
- Election results by precinct
Mayor before election
Smith Joseph
Nonpartisan
Elected mayor
Smith Joseph
Nonpartisan

The 2017 North Miami mayoral election took place on May 9, 2017. Incumbent Mayor Smith Joseph ran for re-election to a second full term. He was challenged by three candidates: Hector Medina, a retired physician; Danielle Beauvais, a 2005 candidate for Mayor; and Tyrone Hill, a middle school teacher. Joseph campaigned on his administration's removal of red-light cameras, reducing property taxes, and overseeing an increase in local home values, while his opponents emphasized the need for reform and transparency in city government. Joseph ultimately won re-election by a wide margin, receiving 60 percent of the vote and avoiding a runoff election.

== General election ==
=== Candidates ===
- Smith Joseph, incumbent Mayor
- Hector Medina, retired physician
- Danielle Beauvais, emergency response reservist, tai chi instructor, 2005 candidate for Mayor
- Tyrone Hill, middle school teacher

=== Results ===
2017 North Miami mayoral election results
Party	Candidate	Votes	%
Nonpartisan	Smith Joseph (inc.)	2,515	59.84%
Nonpartisan	Hector Medina	728	17.32%
Nonpartisan	Danielle Beauvais	669	15.92%
Nonpartisan	Tyrone Hill	291	6.92%
Total votes		4,203	100.00%
