= Andre Pierre =

American politician

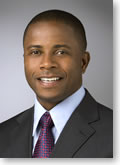

Mayor of North Miami, Florida
- In office 2009–2013
- Preceded by: Kevin Burns
- Succeeded by: Lucie Tondreau

Personal details
- Born: March 23, 1969 (age 57) Arcahaie, Haiti
- Party: Democratic
- Education: New York Institute of Technology, University of Miami
- Occupation: Lawyer

Andre Pierre (born March 23, 1969) is an American attorney and Democratic politician and who served as mayor of North Miami, Florida.

== Biography ==
Pierre was born in Arcahaie, Haiti on March 23, 1969. After emigrating to the United States as a teenager, he attended high school in Long Island and obtained a college degree in engineering from the New York Institute of Technology. A law graduate of the University of Miami, he settled in North Miami, where he began practicing law, became involved in civic activities and politics, resides with his wife, a high school teacher, and his two sons. He was elected in 2009 as mayor of North Miami. Pierre's time in office was marred by a number of scandals, including the arrest and conviction of his nephew for bribery. He served two terms stepping down in 2013 due to term limits.

An immigration and naturalization law adjunct professor at Barry University, in 2010, U.S. Secretary of State Hillary Clinton appointed Pierre as a member of the United States delegation to the International Conference of World Cities and Regions for Haiti held in Martinique, a department of France. He also served as co-chair of the United States Conference of Mayors Immigration Task Force Committee. Currently he owns a law firm, Andre Pierre Law Firm. He is also an advisor with Cayemite Enterprises on Petite Cayemite

== Sources ==
- https://web.archive.org/web/20120329134356/http://www.northmiamifl.gov/departments/mayor_council/mayor.asp
