= Biscayne Bay Campus =

Campus of Florida International University in Miami

Coordinates: 25.9090°N 80.1400°W

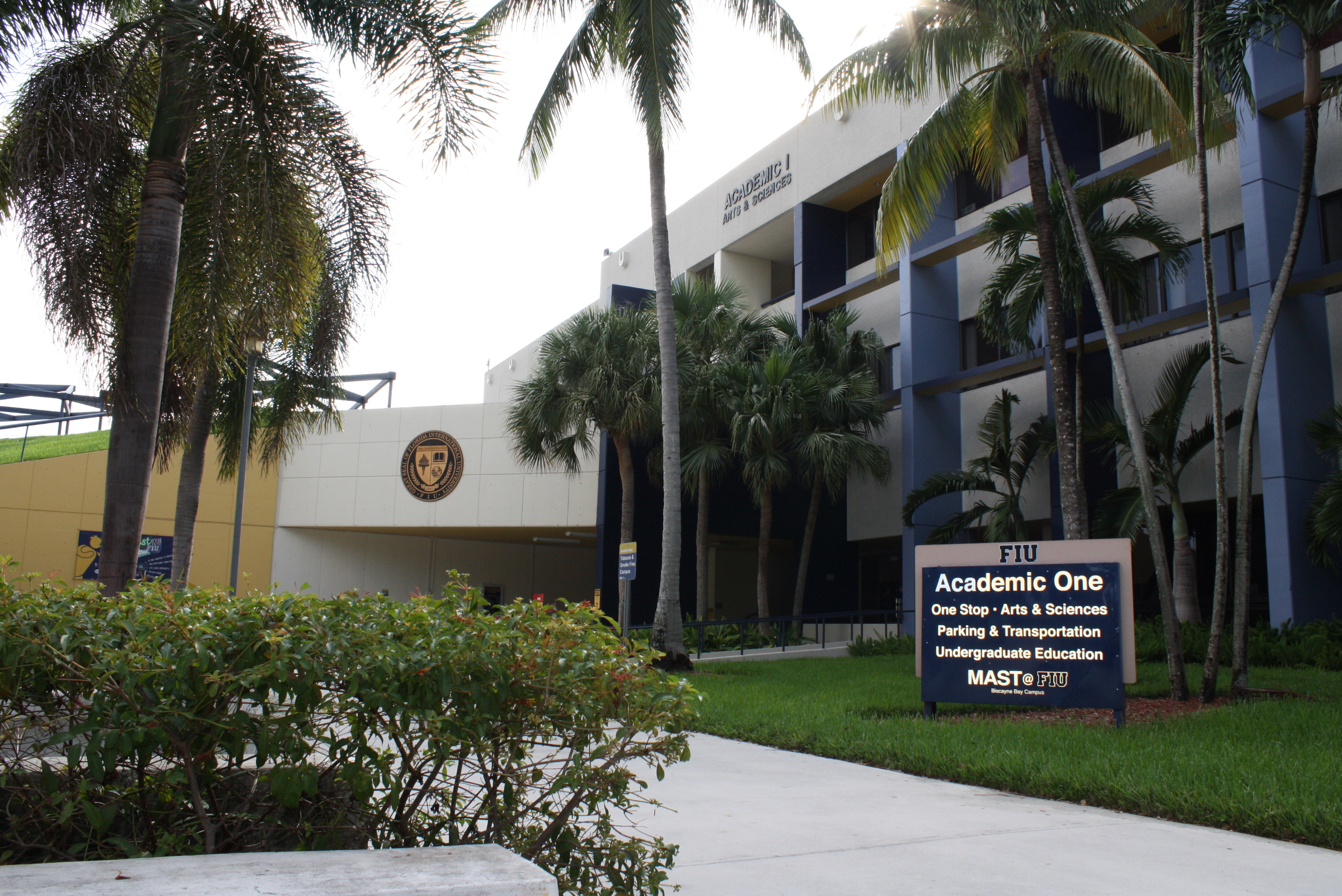
Academic I building at Florida International University's Biscayne Bay Campus

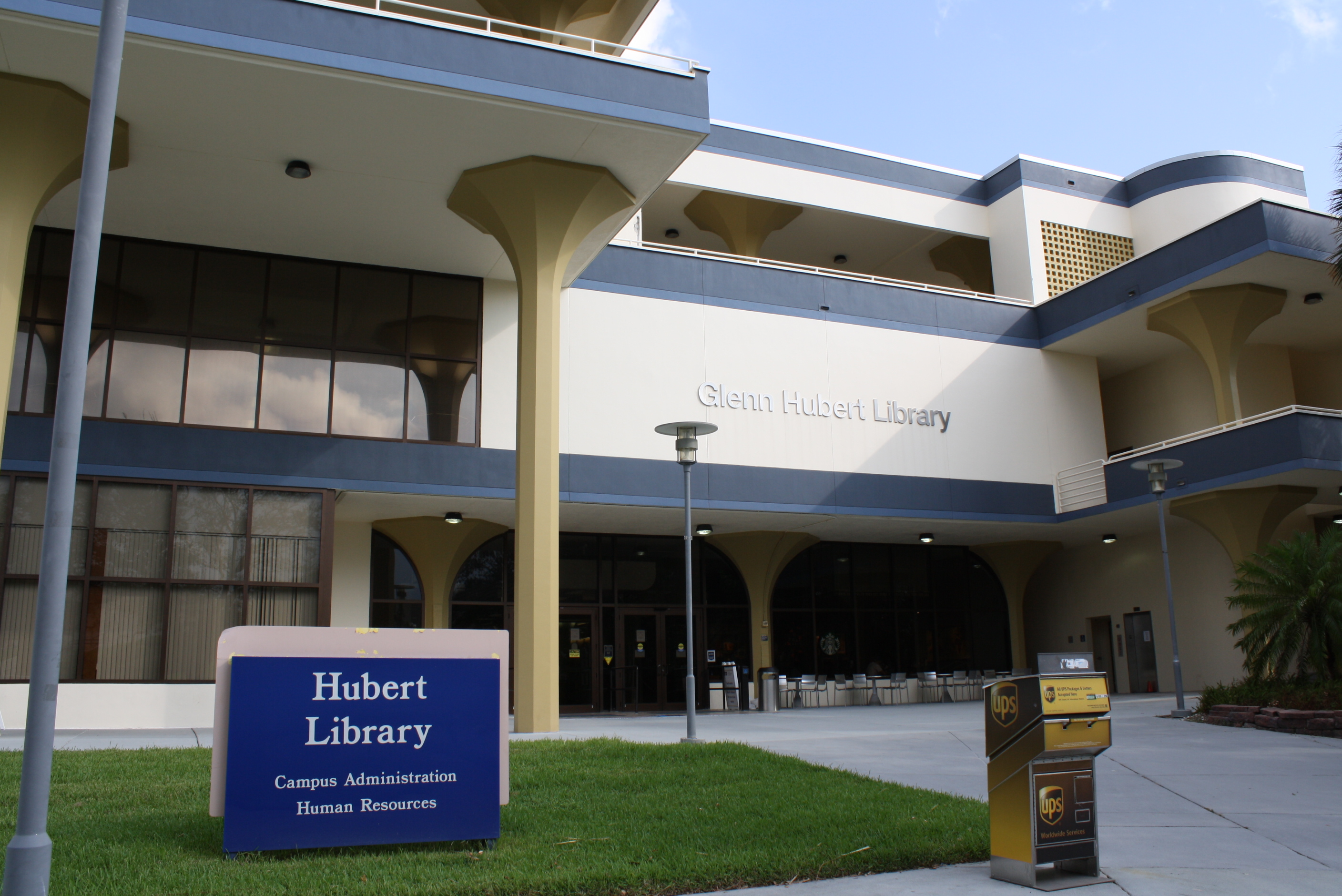
The Glenn Hubert Library at Florida International University's Biscayne Bay Campus

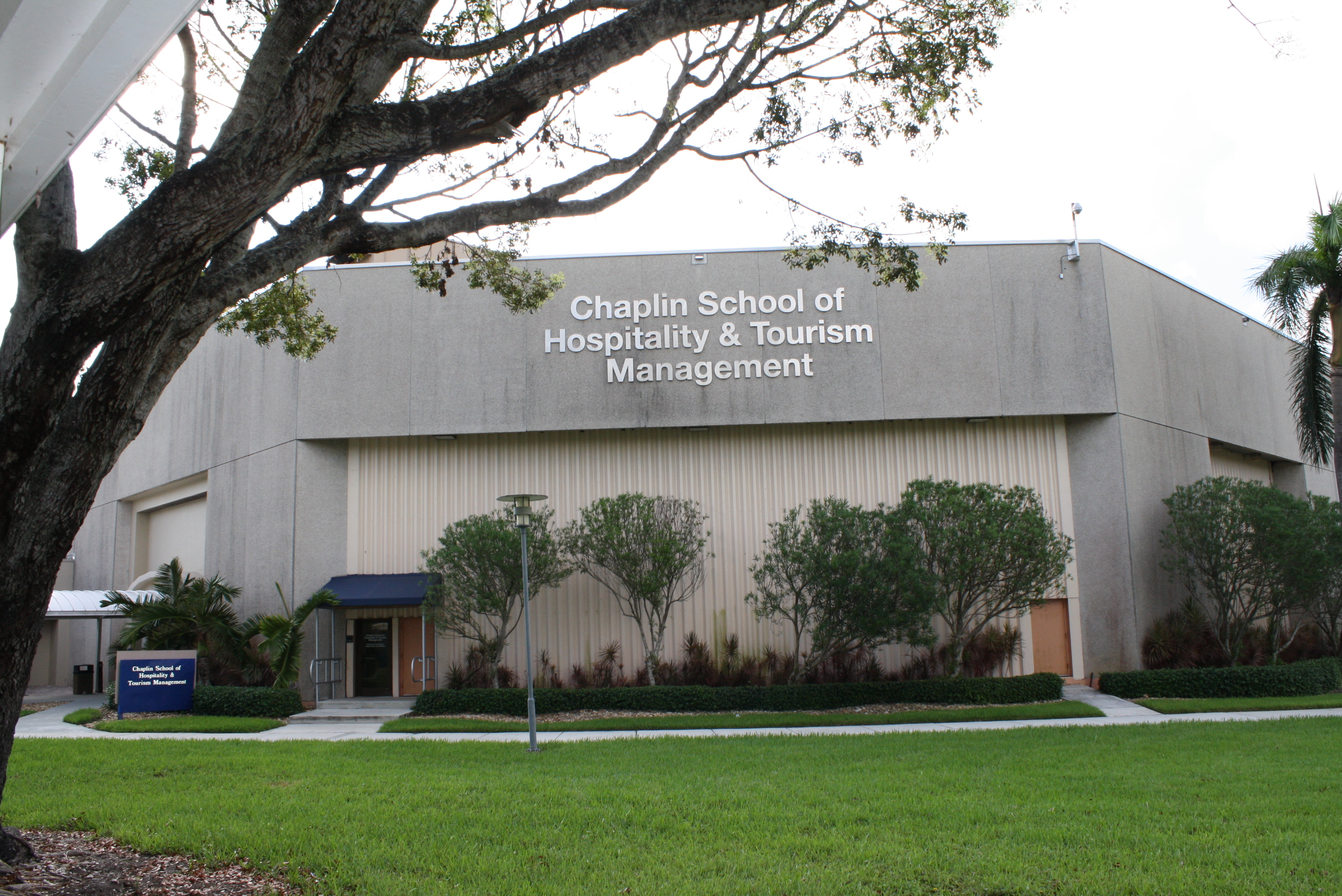
The Chaplin School of Hospitality and Tourism Management at Florida International University's Biscayne Bay Campus

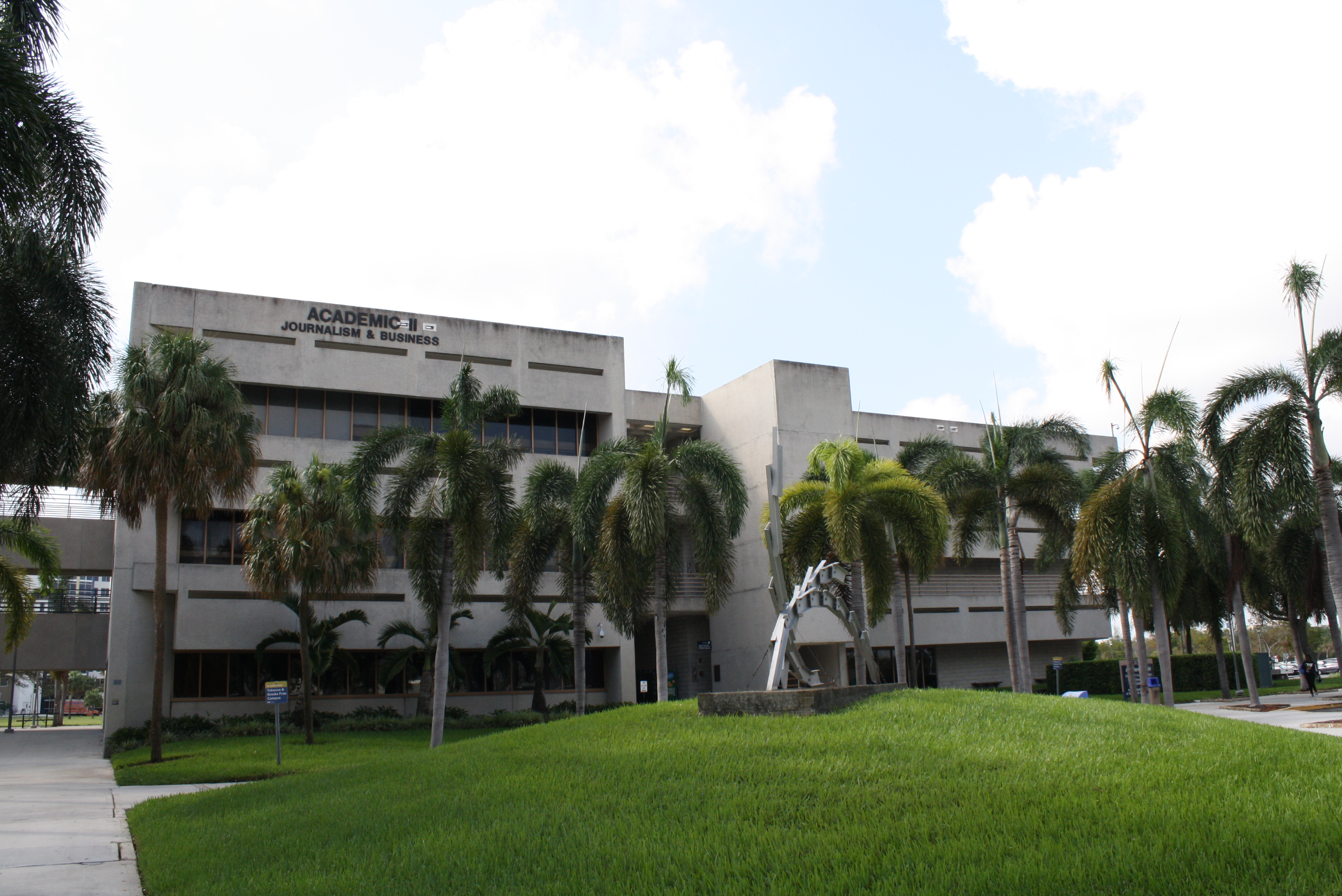
Academic II (Journalism and Business) at Florida International University's Biscayne Bay Campus

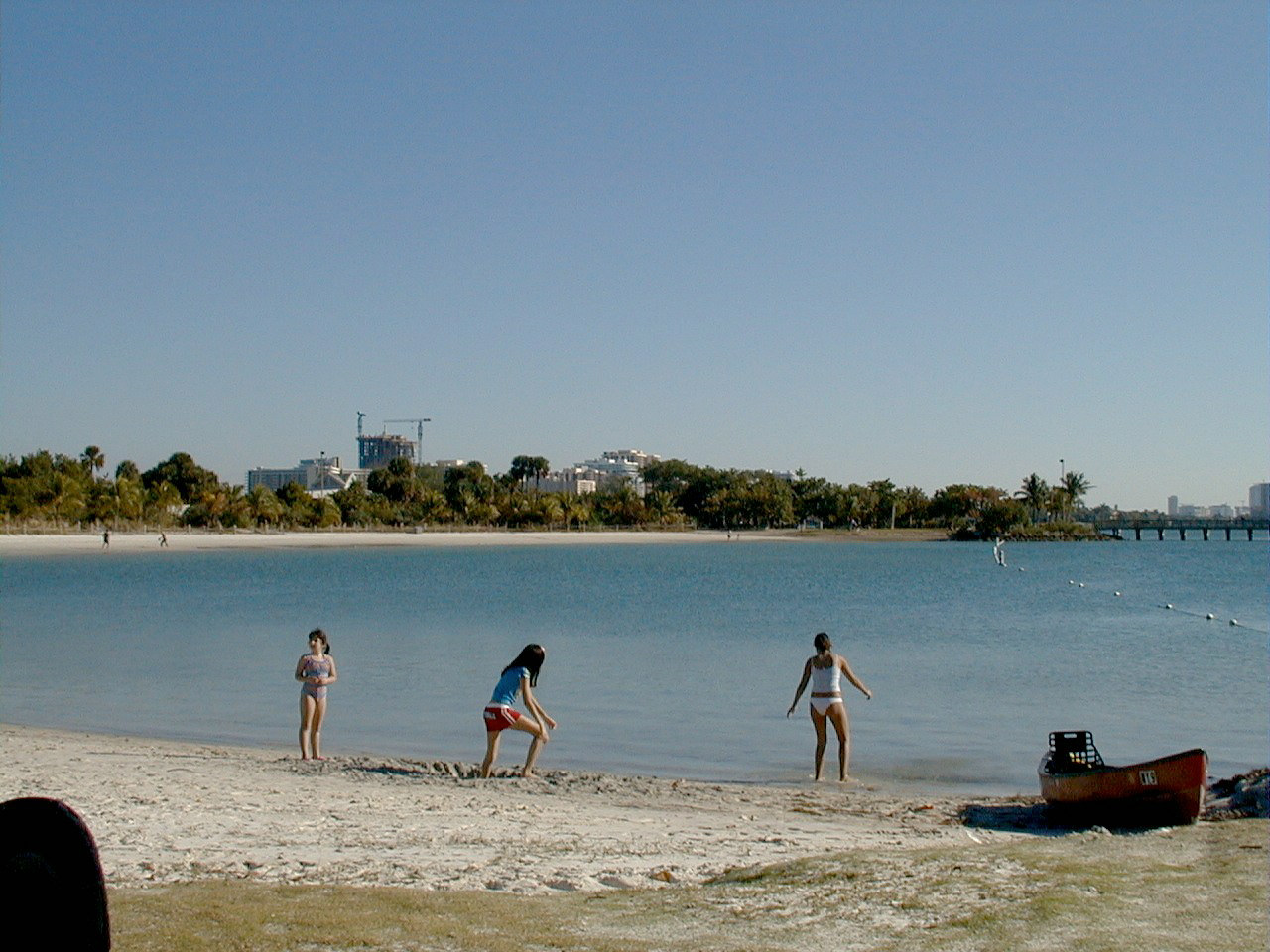
The Biscayne Bay Campus is surrounded by the Oleta River State Park.

The Biscayne Bay Campus (BBC), located in North Miami, Florida, is a branch campus of Florida International University. With a student body of more than 7,000, it is the largest branch campus in Florida's State University System.

FIU's nationally ranked schools of Chaplin School of Hospitality and Tourism Management, Journalism and Mass Communication, Environment, Arts and Society, and Business Administration are headquartered at BBC. Offering numerous undergraduate majors and selected graduate degrees located about an hour from FIU main campus.

Encompassing nearly 200 acres, the campus is surrounded by the largest urban park in Florida, Oleta River State Park. It includes a library, an aquatic center, a conference center, a food court and a marine science research facility.

FIU's Biscayne Bay Campus completed renovations in the Fall of 2014, including a new Panther Plaza, Wolfe University Center Lobby, Wolfe University Center Lounge, Wine Spectator Restaurant, Hubert Library Instructional Lab, Starbucks, Food Court, and Royal Caribbean International Performance and Production Facility.

== Food Network Festival ==
The Food Network & Cooking Channel South Beach Wine & Food Festival celebrated its 15th anniversary in February 2016. The Festival now attracts more than 65,000 guests annually to its 85+ events throughout the weekend. To date, the Festival has raised more than $24 million for the School.

== FIU-Royal Caribbean partnership ==
On December 19, 2013, FIU's president Mark B. Rosenberg announced a new partnership between FIU and Royal Caribbean Cruises Ltd. (RCL). that includes a 130,000-square-foot, state-of-the-art rehearsal and production studio on Friday for Royal Caribbean's onboard entertainment, and provides learning and practical opportunities for our FIU students. Located on FIU's Biscayne Bay Campus, the production studio features three-story studios, a 300-seat theater, 20,000-square-foot costume-making facility, 10 rehearsal studios, and recording and video editing facilities.

== Wolfe University Center ==
The Wolfe University Center serves as the social community center for Biscayne Bay Campus. The facility received a $2 million renovation completed in the Fall of 2014. The Wolfe University Center is a multipurpose building consisting of a theater, three (3) meeting rooms, an executive conference room, and four (4) ballrooms. The Wolfe University Center can accommodate up to 500 guests. It also features ATM, bank, food court, computer lab, business center, bookstore on site, student video game lounge, in-house caterer, on-site ropes course and team-building, recreational areas such as tennis courts, olympic pool and gym. Home to cultural, educational, and recreational programs, it offers involvement opportunities for students, faculty, staff, alumni, and visitors.

== Campus life ==
=== Student Government Association ===
The Student Government Association represents the student body. Their sole purpose is to ensure that student voices are heard and expressed to the administrators. SGA represents the student body's needs on the Biscayne Bay Campus of Florida International University through the Governor of the Biscayne Bay Campus, elected by the students of the campus to serve their needs.

=== Student Programming Council ===
The Student Programming Council is an organization that programs events for the FIU students and its community. Events include comedy shows, movies, concerts, pool parties, special events and lectures. Members of SPC have the opportunity to gain leadership experience, network and learn how to program a variety of events. In addition, the council works with other organizations on campus to provide more diverse programming to students.

== Housing ==
FIU Biscayne Bay residence halls	Year opened	Students	Accommodations
Bay Vista Hall - CLOSED 2014 (BBC)	1984	300	Biscayne Bay Campus-All students
BayView Student Living	FALL 2016	408	Biscayne Bay Campus-All students

Bay Vista Housing was the student housing from 1985 to 2014. In the Fall of 2016 the new BayView Student Living opened up.

Bay Vista Housing was a four-story, apartment-style building that opens into a courtyard. Bay Vista Housing was closed down in 2014 for refurbishment. It is located about 30 miles north of the MMC Campus in North Miami. It will reopen in order to house residents of Royal Caribbean Cruise Line offices.

BayView Student Living opened in July 2016.
