= North Miami, Florida =

- City
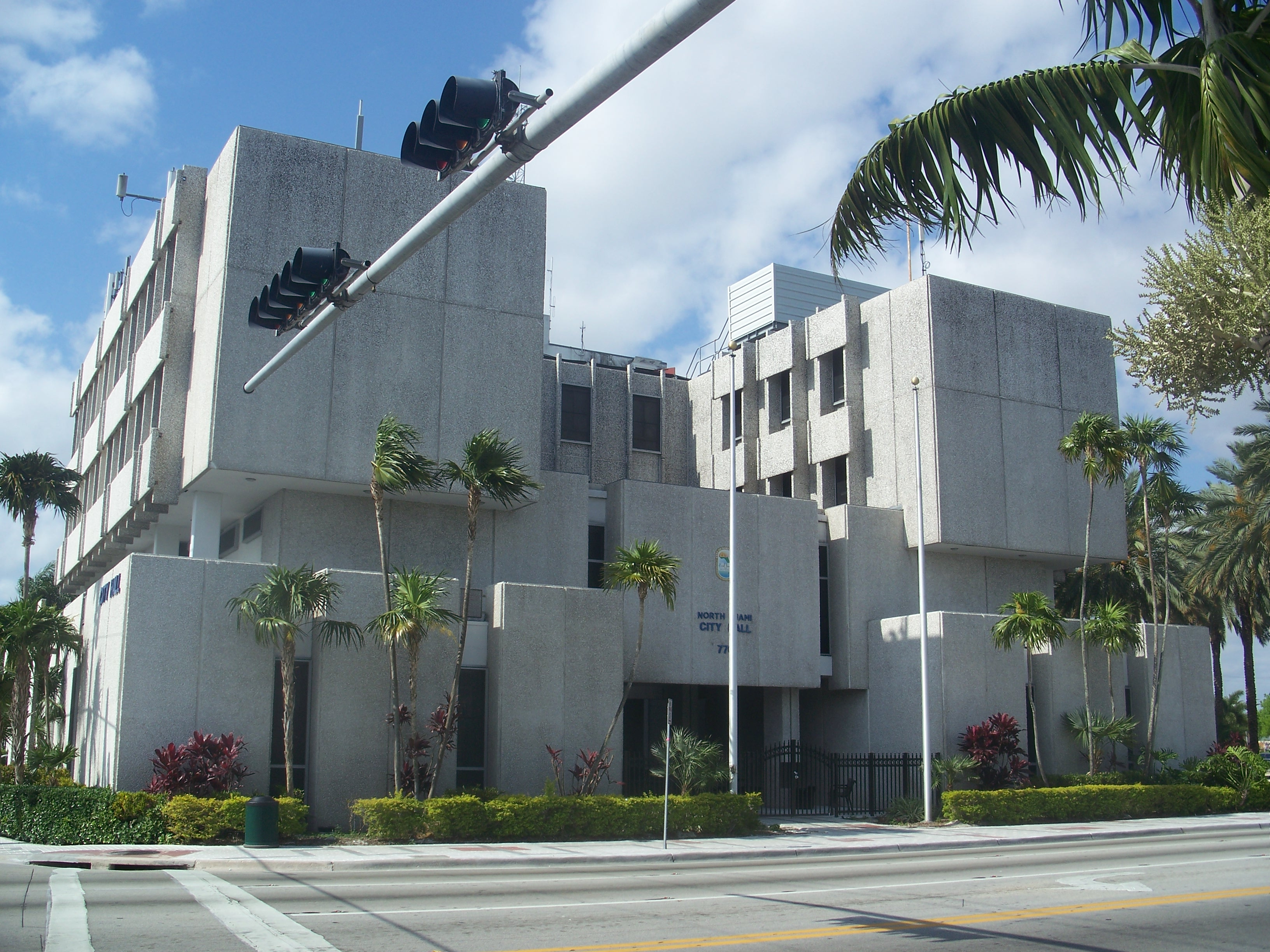
- City Hall

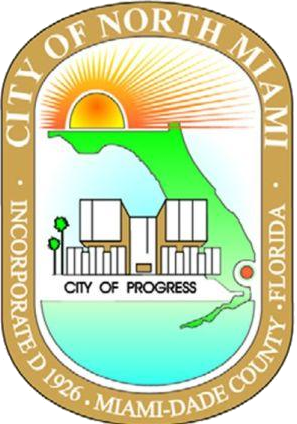
- Seal
- Nickname: NoMi
- Motto: City of Progress
- Interactive map of North Miami, Florida
- Coordinates: 25°54′03″N 80°10′07″W
- Country: United States
- State: Florida
- County: Miami-Dade
- Settled: 1890
- Incorporated (town): February 1, 1926
- Incorporated (city): May 27, 1953

Government
  - Type: Council-Manager

Area
  - Total: 10.05 sq mi (26.03 km^{2})
  - Land: 8.46 sq mi (21.91 km^{2})
  - Water: 1.59 sq mi (4.12 km^{2}) 15.32%
- Elevation: 7 ft (2.1 m)

Population (2020)
  - Total: 60,191
  - Density: 7,115/sq mi (2,747/km^{2})
- Time zone: UTC−05 (EST)
  - Summer (DST): UTC−04 (EDT)
- ZIP Codes: 33161, 33167, 33168, 33181, 33160 (North Miami Beach)
- Area codes: 305, 786, 645
- FIPS code: 12-49450
- GNIS feature ID: 2404394
- Website: www.northmiamifl.gov

North Miami is a suburban city located in northeast Miami-Dade County, Florida, United States, about 10 miles (16 km) north of Miami. The city lies on Biscayne Bay and hosts the Biscayne Bay Campus of Florida International University. Originally the "Town of Arch Creek", the area was incorporated as the "Town of Miami Shores", which was renamed the "Town of North Miami" in 1931. It was reincorporated as a city in 1953. The city is part of the Miami metropolitan area of South Florida. As of the 2020 census, North Miami had a population of 60,191.

The city is also home to the Oleta River State Park, which is the state's largest urban park.

North Miami is known for its large Haitian American population, and the city is strongly influenced by its Haitian heritage. It has one of the largest concentrations of Haitian-Americans in the United States. The city also has a large population of other West Indians, such as Jamaicans and Bahamians.

== History ==
=== Early history ===
In the final phase of indigenous peoples inhabitation of the area that eventually became "North Miami", United States Army soldiers in 1856 cut a Military Trail through nearly impassable thickets and rivers connecting Fort Lauderdale to Fort Dallas at the mouth of the Miami River. This eight-foot trail, Dade County’s first roadway, crossed a unique natural bridge—a natural limestone bridge spanning 40 feet (12 m) across the creek that no longer stands in Arch Creek Memorial Park—in an area that would attract a settlement that early on would be known as "Arch Creek". Even before 1890, a handful of adventuresome pioneers spent brief periods around the Arch Creek Natural Bridge, a centuries-old Indian settlement.

In 1891, Charles J. Ihle was the first to put down roots in the Arch Creek vicinity. He purchased 80 acres (320,000 m^{2}) from the State of Florida at one dollar an acre in the area of today’s N.E. 116th Street and Biscayne Boulevard. The place was so remote that his nearest northern neighbor was thought to live in Ft. Lauderdale. Ihle built a temporary palmetto frond shelter. During the next 27 years he grew shallots, coontie, squashes, bananas, sugar cane, Puerto Rican pineapples, lemons, guavas, limes, rose apples, Jamaican apples, and tomatoes.

By 1905 the area surrounding the nine-year-old Arch Creek Railroad Depot had become the community’s hub. It was located at 125th Street and the F.E.C. tracks. That year a post office and a school were opened nearby. By 1912, eighteen homes, a church, a general store, a blacksmith shop, and two tomato packing houses were located around the railroad. The population was estimated at less than one hundred. Farming was still the principal occupation.

The Florida land boom that was underway in the 1920s spread to the Arch Creek farming community. The Biscayne Canal was dug in 1924 to remove farmland from flooded conditions. But as a consequence, the soil began to lose its moisture, and the farming which had been the backbone of the economy was no longer profitable. However, in step with the times, this drained land became available for partitioning, lot sales, and development.

=== Birth of North Miami ===
Thirty-eight out of the 47 registered voters, at the encouragement of developers E.C. Harner, Earl Irons, and Arthur Griffing, showed up and voted to incorporate into a town on February 5, 1926. North Miami, between 1926 and 1931, was named "Town of Miami Shores", partially because its early eastern boundary was the Atlantic Ocean. The Town limits were: bounded on the south by Miami and Miami Beach, on the east by the Atlantic Ocean, on the west by 17th Avenue, and on the north by a line which approximates Golden Glades Drive or 166th Street. Incorporation moved costs from developers to residents and lot purchasers. Late in 1926, a bond issue of $287,000 was passed to build streets, sidewalks, a town hall, a water system, and fire protection.

The devastating September 1926 hurricane burst the real estate land speculation. The local community recovered from the damage, but lot sales came to a stop, and the northern tourist's names showed up in great numbers on the delinquent tax list. Some money from the bond issue was used to build a Spanish-Mediterranean style city hall building at N.E. 8th Avenue and 125th Street in 1928. The City Hall also housed the police and fire departments. In the 1930s a new water plant and gravity tank were installed behind City Hall. The first newspaper, The Miami Shores Bulletin, was published in 1927–1928 and chronicled the events of the times. The historic William Jennings Bryan school was constructed in 1928 on the same spot where the Arch Creek Elementary School had burned down the year before.

=== The 1930s ===
Seven miles (11 km) of Atlantic oceanfront beachland property from the Broward County line southward to Surfside were removed from the town limits as a result of a 1931 Florida Supreme Court decision. The 1926 hurricane ended plans for a causeway to deliver municipal services to that area of town. With no services being received, the beach area instituted a lengthy court lawsuit to separate and form their own community.

The wealthy Shoreland Company, located to the south of the Town, lobbied the 1931 Florida Legislature to officially grant their huge development the name "Miami Shores Village". The Legislature did so. It also passed an official act abolishing "Town of Miami Shores" as a name. The next step was for the local population to choose a new name. The municipality was renamed the "Town of North Miami".

During the Depression years, in 1933, Mrs. Cecille Sevier and Mrs. Ella S. Klefeker became the first two women elected to the Town Council. The 1940s census stated that 1,973 inhabitants lived in the "Town of North Miami".

=== Post World War II growth ===
At the end of World War II in 1945, the large and constant influx of former military veterans and their young families changed the face of North Miami by ushering in a great growth period. Homebuilding, road building, shops, stores, and office business construction now continued for decades almost without stopping. By 1951 it was reported nationally that North Miami was one of the fastest-growing towns in the United States. During this time, the growing community needed a high school, so in 1951 construction started for North Miami High School. In August 1954, North Miami High School opened its doors for the children of the growing community.

Partially to meet this challenge of fast growth, the voters of North Miami in 1952 voted to adopt a new charter and a new name. The new charter, enacted as an official statute of the Florida Legislature on May 27, 1953, provided for the establishment of a full-time administrative head (City Manager form of government) to carry out the policies of the elected Mayor/Council. The new and present name officially introduced on this date—the City of North Miami.

In 2001, voters made Republican Josaphat Celestin the first Haitian American mayor of a large Miami-Dade County community. In 2009, voters made Democrat and Haitian immigrant Andre Pierre mayor of North Miami. In 2013, voters made Haitian American Lucie Tondreau the city's first female Haitian American Mayor; she soon left office, after being charged for mortgage fraud. In 2014, voters made Haitian immigrant Dr. Smith Joseph mayor of North Miami. In 2019, voters made Philippe Bien-Aime, who was born in Haiti and migrated to the US in 1993, mayor of North Miami.

== Geography ==
According to the United States Census Bureau, the city has a total area of 10.0 square miles (26 km^{2}). 8.5 square miles (22 km^{2}) of it is land and 1.5 square miles (3.9 km^{2}) of it (15.32%) is water.

=== Neighborhoods ===
- Alhambra Heights
- Arch Creek Highlands
- Biscayne Park North
- Central
- Central East
- Central North
- Central Northeast
- Central Northwest
- Central South
- Central West
- City Center of North Miami
- Golden Glades East
- Golden Glades South
- Johnson & Wales University North Miami
- Keystone Point / Amber Creek East
- San Souci
- Westside Sunkist Grove
- Westside Sunkist Grove North

=== Climate ===
North Miami has a tropical monsoon climate (Köppen climate classification Am). Summers are very hot and long lasting with very warm nights with very plentiful and heavy rainfall. Winters are short, warm, and dry.

Climate data for North Miami
Month	Jan	Feb	Mar	Apr	May	Jun	Jul	Aug	Sep	Oct	Nov	Dec	Year
Mean daily maximum °F (°C)	75 (24)	77 (25)	81 (27)	84 (29)	88 (31)	90 (32)	92 (33)	92 (33)	91 (33)	87 (31)	83 (28)	78 (26)	85 (29)
Mean daily minimum °F (°C)	62 (17)	64 (18)	68 (20)	70 (21)	74 (23)	79 (26)	78 (26)	78 (26)	78 (26)	74 (23)	70 (21)	65 (18)	72 (22)
Average precipitation inches (mm)	2.34 (59)	2.22 (56)	3.20 (81)	3.90 (99)	6.08 (154)	10.24 (260)	7.00 (178)	9.20 (234)	8.88 (226)	6.56 (167)	3.83 (97)	2.59 (66)	66.04 (1,677)

=== Surrounding areas ===
Golden Glades, North Miami Beach
Opa-locka Sunny Isles Beach
Westview Sunny Isles Beach, Biscayne Bay, Bay Harbor Islands
Westview Biscayne Bay
Pinewood, Unincorporated Miami-Dade County, Biscayne Park

== Demographics ==
Historical population
Census	Pop.	Note	%±
1940	1,973		—
1950	10,734		444.0%
1960	28,708		167.4%
1970	34,767		21.1%
1980	42,566		22.4%
1990	49,998		17.5%
2000	59,880		19.8%
2010	58,786		−1.8%
2020	60,191		2.4%
U.S. Decennial Census

=== Racial and ethnic composition ===
North Miami city, Florida – Racial and ethnic composition Note: the US Census treats Hispanic/Latino as an ethnic category. This table excludes Latinos from the racial categories and assigns them to a separate category. Hispanics/Latinos may be of any race.
Race / Ethnicity (NH = Non-Hispanic)	Pop 2000	Pop 2010	Pop 2020	% 2000	% 2010	% 2020
White alone (NH)	10,860	7,287	6,513	18.14%	12.40%	10.82%
Black or African American alone (NH)	31,758	33,243	30,397	53.04%	56.55%	50.50%
Native American or Alaska Native alone (NH)	123	123	77	0.21%	0.21%	0.13%
Asian alone (NH)	1,130	950	907	1.89%	1.62%	1.51%
Pacific Islander or Native Hawaiian alone (NH)	23	22	4	0.04%	0.04%	0.01%
Other race alone (NH)	132	162	496	0.22%	0.28%	0.82%
Mixed race or Multiracial (NH)	1,985	1,040	1,449	3.31%	1.77%	2.41%
Hispanic or Latino (any race)	13,869	15,959	20,348	23.16%	27.15%	33.81%
Total	59,880	58,786	60,191	100.00%	100.00%	100.00%

=== 2020 census ===
As of the 2020 census, North Miami had a population of 60,191. The median age was 38.4 years. 20.0% of residents were under the age of 18 and 15.1% of residents were 65 years of age or older. For every 100 females there were 92.0 males, and for every 100 females age 18 and over there were 89.7 males age 18 and over.

100.0% of residents lived in urban areas, while 0.0% lived in rural areas.

There were 21,299 households in North Miami, of which 32.9% had children under the age of 18 living in them. Of all households, 36.0% were married-couple households, 22.3% were households with a male householder and no spouse or partner present, and 34.3% were households with a female householder and no spouse or partner present. About 26.4% of all households were made up of individuals and 7.7% had someone living alone who was 65 years of age or older.

There were 22,948 housing units, of which 7.2% were vacant. The homeowner vacancy rate was 1.3% and the rental vacancy rate was 6.5%.

Racial composition as of the 2020 census
Race	Number	Percent
White	10,720	17.8%
Black or African American	31,104	51.7%
American Indian and Alaska Native	240	0.4%
Asian	951	1.6%
Native Hawaiian and Other Pacific Islander	17	0.0%
Some other race	5,574	9.3%
Two or more races	11,585	19.2%

=== 2010 census ===
As of the 2010 census, there were 58,786 people, 18,554 households, and 12,768 families residing in the city.

=== 2000 census ===
As of 2000, 37.6% had children under the age of 18 living with them, 39.0% were married couples living together, 20.1% had a female householder with no husband present, and 33.9% were non-families. 26.9% of all households were made up of individuals, and 6.8% had someone living alone who was 65 years of age or older. The average household size was 2.85 and the average family size was 3.51.

In 2000, the city the population was spread out, with 28.1% under the age of 18, 11.3% from 18 to 24, 31.8% from 25 to 44, 19.6% from 45 to 64, and 9.2% who were 65 years of age or older. The median age was 32 years. For every 100 females, there were 92.7 males. For every 100 females age 18 and over, there were 89.0 males.

In 2000, the median income for a household in the city was $29,778, and the median income for a family was $31,760. Males had a median income of $25,388 versus $20,712 for females. The per capita income for the city was $14,581. About 20.7% of families and 23.9% of the population were below the poverty line, including 29.5% of those under age 18 and 17.2% of those age 65 or over.

As of 2000, residents who spoke English as a first language were 35.50% of the population, French Creole 33.28%, Spanish 24.89%, and French 2.69% of the population.

=== Ethnic groups ===
As of 2011 North Miami has a middle class Haitian American population; many Haitians moved from the inner city of Miami to North Miami.

== Government ==
North Miami is governed using the council-manager system. The mayor and the city clerk are elected at large. There are four districts each electing one member of the council. The council has authority over the manager.

Mayors of North Miami, Florida

Image	Mayor	Years	Notes
		?	
	Frank Wolland	1999–2001	
	Josaphat Celestin	2001–2005	First Haitian American and African-American mayor of North Miami
	Kevin Burns	2005–2009	
	Andre Pierre	2009–2013	
	Lucie Tondreau	2013 – May 21, 2014	First Haitian American and African-American female mayor of North Miami. On May 21, 2014, she was suspended as Mayor of North Miami after allegations of mortgage fraud. Vice Mayor Philippe Bien-Aime was named acting mayor.
	Philippe Bien-Aime	May 21, 2014 – November 5, 2014 (Acting)	
	Smith Joseph	November 5, 2014 – 2019	
	Philippe Bien-Aime	May 28, 2019 – October 18, 2022	Sworn in on May 28, 2019 Resigned on October 18, 2022 to run for Miami-Dade City Commission
	Alix Desulme	2022 to present	

== Economy ==
Yogen Früz has its United States East Coast offices in North Miami.

== Transportation ==
In December 2004, the city of North Miami implemented a free community bus service called the NoMi Express, in order to increase the number of local destinations that can be reached through public transit. Since its inauguration in December 2004, the NoMi Express averages approximately 750 boardings per day, which translates to 16,000 boardings per month, or 190,000 boardings annually. The county-wide Metrobus system also serves North Miami.

== Attractions ==
=== Museums ===
- The Museum of Contemporary Art (MOCA) is a museum located in the heart of downtown North Miami, Florida. The 23,000-square-foot (2,100 m^{2}) structure was designed by the internationally acclaimed architect Charles Gwathmey of Gwathmey Siegel, New York City, who worked in conjunction with the Miami firm of Gelabert-Navia to create the building.
- The Miami Auto Museum displays a large collection of classic cars, Hollywood cars, mini cars, scooters, motorcycles and bicycles from the collection of Michael Dezer.

=== State parks ===
- The Oleta River State Park is the largest urban park in the Florida State Park system. The park is located on 1,043 acres (4.22 km^{2}) - 993 acres (4.02 km^{2}) of land and 50 acres (0.20 km^{2}) of inland water - on Biscayne Bay, in the northeastern end of the city of North Miami in Miami-Dade County, Florida, and adjoins the Biscayne Bay Campus of Florida International University. In some documents, the park is designated as the Oleta River State Recreation Area. The park contains one of the largest concentrations of Australian pine trees (an invasive species) found in a Florida state park.
- The Arch Creek Park was formally dedicated on April 25, 1982. Today, Arch Creek is an 8-acre (32,000 m^{2}) site at the junction of N.E. 135th Street and Biscayne Boulevard in North Miami, Fla., and offers many opportunities for botanical, historical and archaeological study. It has a museum/nature center modeled after an early Florida pioneer home, displaying Indian artifacts dug from the grounds, and live animals from the nearby hammock. Remains of the original coontie mill are still visible across the creek, and the park exists as the only preserved archaeological site in the county.

=== Chinatown ===
Chinatown is a 90-acre planned revitalization district located on NW 7th Avenue that as of 2019 was still under construction. As of 2020, the project was under some jeopardy due to the COVID-19 pandemic and the resulting anti-Asian sentiment.

== Biscayne Landing ==
Biscayne Landing is a mixed use commercial/hotel/residential community being developed on the site of the Munisport Landfill Superfund Site. The city of North Miami will retain ownership of this brownfield site, and the developers, Boca Developers, will retain a 200-year lease for the development of the project.

The master-planned development will feature approximately 120,000 square feet (11,000 m^{2}) of commercial office and retail space, 2,800 to 5,000 residential units, a park and recreation facilities. As part of the development agreement for the site, the project's developer has also committed to renovating the city's library and building a school, Olympic training facility, and affordable housing on several sites located in North Miami. Completion of all elements of the project are projected by 2021.

A portion of the Biscayne Landing site includes some of the wetlands of Biscayne Bay, which will be preserved in the form of a 35-acre (140,000 m^{2}) environmental park, containing nature hikes, jogging paths, information plaques that describe the resident wildlife and trees, benches, a canoe landing and a boat house. It will also have connecting trails to Oleta River State Park. This area is the site of a former trash dump and is the home to a large sewage treatment plant nearby.

In 2009, Biscayne Landing was reeling in the real estate downturn. Most of the units in the two buildings online were uninhabited; very few were selling. There is little actual construction on any other project related to their contractual obligations under a redevelopment agreement with the city of North Miami.

Recently the now defunct Biscayne Landing was acquired by the Soffers (Aventura Mall Developers) and LeFranks and together are building SoleMia. This development will be over 1 million square feet and is the largest mixed-use construction project in the U.S.

== Education ==
=== Primary and secondary schools ===
North Miami High School (Old building (shown here) is down as of 2012; New building has been up since 2009)

Miami-Dade County Public Schools serves North Miami.

==== Elementary schools ====
- Benjamin Franklin Elementary School
- Biscayne Gardens Elementary School
- Gratigny Elementary
- North Miami Elementary School
- Natural Bridge Elementary School
- W. J. Bryan Elementary School

==== Middle schools ====
- Thomas Jefferson Middle School
- North Miami Middle School

==== K–8 centers ====
- David Lawrence Jr. K–8 Center
- Linda Lentin K–8 Center

==== High schools ====
- Alonzo and Tracy Mourning Senior High Biscayne Bay Campus
- North Miami Senior High School
- MAST@FIU BBC

==== Private schools ====
- Northwest Christian Academy
- Holy Cross Lutheran School
- Yeshiva Toras Chaim
- Miami Union Academy SDA
- Montessori School of North Miami
- Get Smart Kids Academy

=== Colleges and universities ===
- Florida International University (Biscayne Bay Campus)

=== Public libraries ===
The North Miami public library is the city's library. While over the years the county wide Miami-Dade Public Library System has taken over the libraries of most of the cities in the county, the North Miami public library has remained independent. The North Miami Public Library was first opened in 1932 by the Biscayne Park Woman's Club. When the library first opened it was located at the City of North Miami's town hall under the supervision of E.May Avil the City Clerk. The library was closed during World War II and it was reopened in September 1945 in the same location at the town hall and still under the supervision of the City Clerk E. May Avil. At this time the library was funded by donations and member fees. "In 1948 the Biscayne Park Woman’s Club turned the library over to the city of North Miami and in 1949 a public referendum established a free Public Library under provisions of the Florida Statutes, setting up a Library Fund and a Library board to administer the operation. Twin sisters, Mrs. Edla Lunden and Mrs. Alma Anderson, were appointed as Librarian and Assistant Librarian, respectively". After the twins retired, Miss Phyllis Gray served from 1955 to 1959 as the library's first professional Librarian. Today Paul Bazile is the current Library Director. In the fall of 2003 the North Miami Public Library's Director signed a Reciprocal Borrowing Agreement with the public library directors of the cities of North Miami Beach, Hialeah and the Miami-Dade Public Library System thereby allowing their patrons free access to the participating libraries. Today the library is undergoing a $1.5 million renovation and the main building is closed to the public, limited library services are available from an annex building next to the main building. The library re-opening is planned for some time in June or July 2015. Library information can be accessed at the library's website.

== Recipients for Key to the City ==
All past recipients to the "Key to the City" for North Miami:

- 2012 Kim and Kourtney Kardashian
- 2013 Gregory Toussaint (Pastor)
- 2018 Eduardo Padron (President of Miami Dade College)

== See also ==
- Arch Creek
- Biscayne Landing
- Miami-Dade County, Florida
- Munisport Landfill
- Museum of Contemporary Art, North Miami
- North Miami High School
- North Miami Middle School
- Oleta River State Park
