= Kevin Burns (mayor) =

American realtor and politician

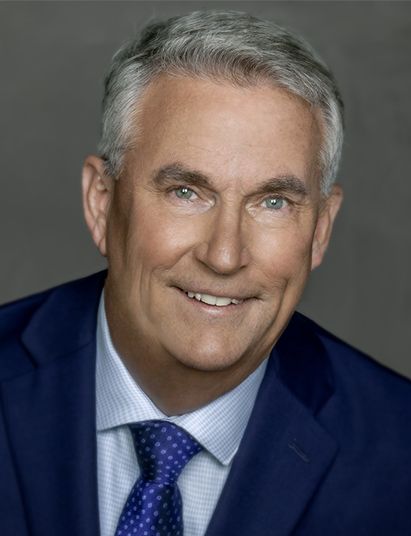

Mayor of North Miami, Florida
- In office 2005–2009
- Preceded by: Josaphat Celestin
- Succeeded by: Andre Pierre

Personal details
- Born: November 22, 1958 (age 67) Miami Beach, Florida
- Party: Democratic
- Spouse: Rob Flint
- Children: Autumn
- Education: Miami Dade College
- Occupation: Realtor, business owner

Kevin Burns (born November 22, 1958, in Miami Beach, Florida) is an American realtor, business owner, and politician. He served as the Mayor of North Miami, Florida, from 2005 to 2009, and currently serves as a City Councilman.

== Early life and career ==
Burns graduated from Miami Edison High School and Miami Dade College. He is a real estate broker for Turnberry International Realty, and owner of North Miami KB's Christmas Trees.

== Mayor ==
Burns was elected mayor of North Miami in May 2005. Burns's campaign and administration mainly focused on education. His administration helped construct an agreement between the City of North Miami and the Miami-Dade County School Board that brought four new schools to North Miami by 2010. He was term-limited, and was not able to seek reelection in 2009.

Burns ran for mayor of North Miami again in 2014 to replace mayor Lucie Tondreau, who was suspended from office. Burns lost the election to Dr. Smith Joseph.

== Senate and State Senate campaigns ==
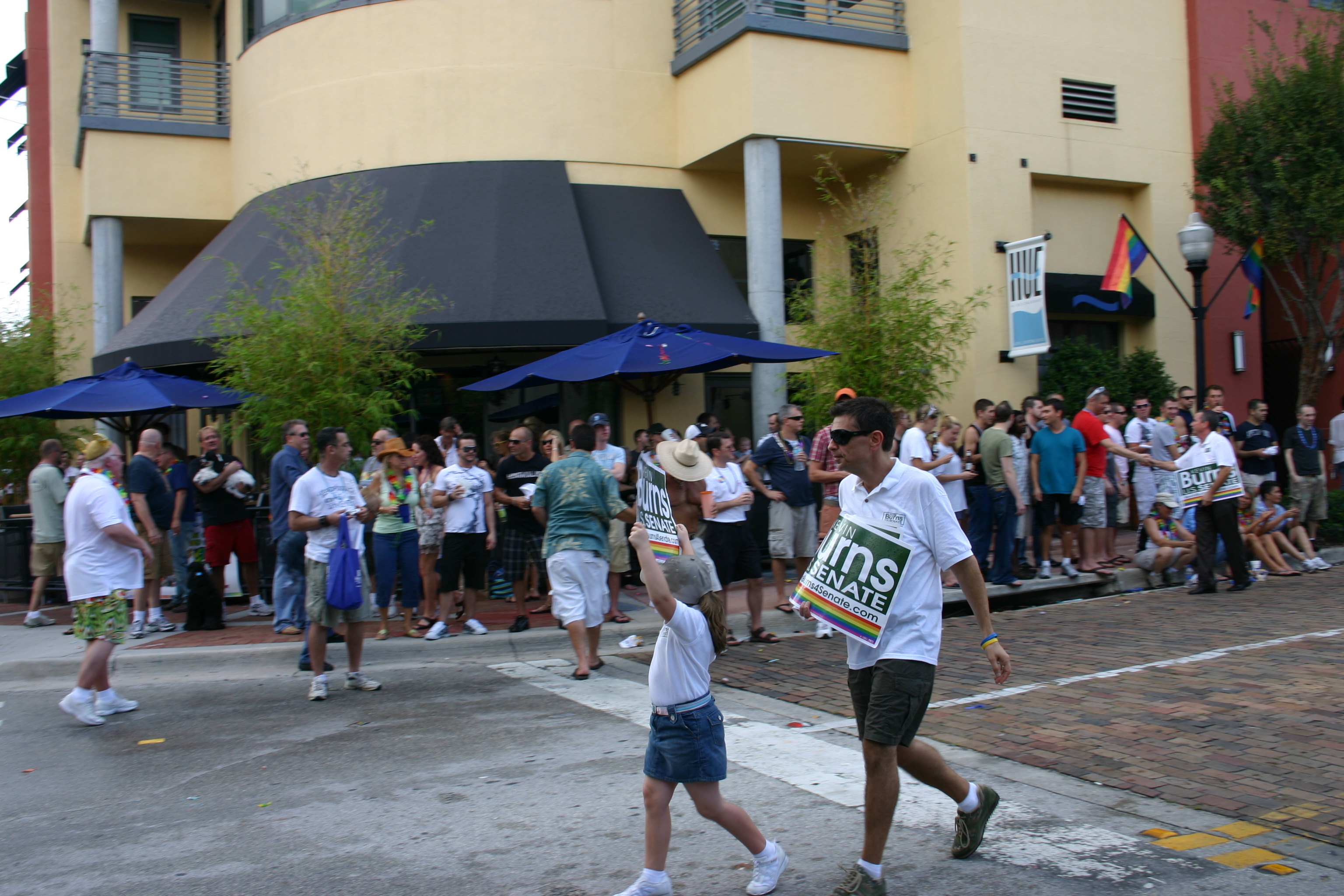
supporters of Burns' U.S. senate campaign march in a 2009 LGBTQ Pride event in Orlando

In February 2009, Burns announced his campaign to seek the seat in the United States Senate being vacated by incumbent Mel Martinez. In May 2010, he dropped out of the Senate race and ran for the Florida state senate. Burns lost to Gwen Margolis in the Democratic primary for State Senate District 35 in August 2010. Burns ran in 2016 for the open Florida state senate district 38, in the Democratic primary. He lost the August 30 primary to Daphne Campbell, garnering 15.26% of the vote and 4,437 votes.

== Community involvement ==
Burns is the former chairman of the Greater North Miami Chamber of Commerce, a position that he was voted into by fellow chamber members in September 2006. He is also a past president of the Keystone Point Home Owners Association, a former chairman of the North Miami University Relations Board, and a founding member of the Community Policing Commission.

== Personal life ==
Burns lives in North Miami with his husband of 30 years Rob Flint and their daughter Autumn.
