= Smith Joseph =

Mayor of North Miami, Florida and physician

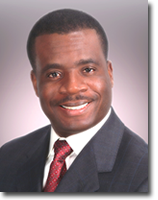

Mayor of North Miami, Florida
- In office 2014–2019
- Preceded by: Philippe Bien-Aime (acting); Lucie Tondreau (elected)
- Succeeded by: Philippe Bein Aime

Personal details
- Born: 1961 (age 64–65) Saint-Louis-du-Nord, Haiti
- Party: Democratic
- Education: Florida A&M University, Nova Southeastern University, Miami Dade College
- Occupation: Politician, physician
- Website: Mayor Office

Smith Joseph, the Democratic mayor of North Miami, Florida and a physician, was born in Haiti in 1961. Joseph emigrated to the United States in 1979 with his family to Miami, Florida. He graduated from Florida A&M University and Nova Southeastern University, later opening a medical practice in 2001. Joseph was also the co-founder of the Society of Haitian American Professionals.

Following the suspension from office of Mayor Lucie Tondreau in 2014, Joseph was elected Mayor of North Miami against former Mayor Kevin Burns.

After the shooting of Charles Kinsey, Mayor Joseph apologized to the family of the victim and promised a complete investigation stating "I have made it clear that I will not tolerate anything that goes against the process."

On 28 May 2019, Philippe Bien-Aime was sworn to succeed Joseph as mayor of North Miami.
